= List of ancient Egyptians =

This is a list of ancient Egyptian people who have articles on Wikipedia. The list covers key Egyptian individuals from the start of the first dynasty.

Note that the dates given are approximate. The list that is presented below is based on the conventional chronology of Ancient Egypt, mostly based on the Digital Egypt for Universities database developed by the Petrie Museum of Egyptian Archaeology.

A - B - C - D - E - F - G - H - I - J - K - L - M - N - O - P - Q - R - S - T - U - V - W - X - Y - Z

== A ==
Name	Main title	Dynasty	Date	Comment
Aabeni	High Steward	13th dynasty	f. c. 19th century-17th century BC	High Steward of the early Thirteenth Dynasty
Aahotepre	Pharaoh	14th dynasty	(fl. c. mid-17th century BC)	Pharaoh of Canaanite descent from the 14th Dynasty possibly identical to 'Ammu.
Aat	Queen	12th dynasty	(fl. c. late-19th century BC)	Queen and wife of Amenemhat III.
Abar	Queen	25th dynasty	(fl. c. mid-8th century BC)	Egyptian queen, the mother of King Taharqa and probably the wife of King Piye.
Achillas	Military commander	Ptolemaic	(fl. mid-1st century BC)	Commander under the Ptolemaic Egyptian king Ptolemy XIII. Executed at the orders of Arsinoe IV of Egypt by Ganymedes.
Addaya	Diplomat	18th dynasty	(fl. c. mid-14th century BC)	Egyptian commissioner in southern Canaan mentioned in the Amarna letters. He probably served under Pharaohs Amenhotep III and/or Akhenaten.
Agathoclea	Mistress	Ptolemaic	(fl. c. late-3rd century BC)	Mistress of the Ptolemaic king Ptolemy IV Philopator and sister of his chief minister, Agathocles. Together, they managed to achieve complete influence over Ptolemy IV.
Agathocles	Minister	Ptolemaic	(fl. c. late-3rd century BC)	Chief minister of the Ptolemaic king Ptolemy IV Philopator and brother of the king's mistress Agathoclea. Together, they managed to achieve complete influence over Ptolemy IV.
Ahaneith	Queen	1st dynasty	(fl. c. 30th century BC)	Wife of King Djet
Ahhotep I	Queen	17th dynasty	(fl. c. mid-16th century BC)	Daughter of Queen Tetisheri and Senakhtenre Ahmose, and was probably the sister, as well as the wife, of pharaoh Seqenenre Tao. Ahhotep reigned as regent until her son, Ahmose I, was of age. Also known as Ahhotpe or Aahhotep.
Ahhotep II	Queen	17th dynasty	(fl. c. mid-16th century BC)	Probably the Great Royal Wife of pharaoh Kamose.
Ahmes	Scribe	17th dynasty	(fl. c. mid-17th century BC)	Wrote the Rhind Mathematical Papyrus, a work of Ancient Egyptian mathematics. Also called Ahmose.
Senakhtenre Ahmose	Pharaoh	17th dynasty	fl. c. mid-16th century BC	Pharaoh of the late 17th dynasty, his existence and complete name were confirmed by recent archeological discoveries.
Ahmose I	Pharaoh	18th dynasty	(reigned c. 1549 BC – c. 1524 BC)	Founder of the 18th dynasty. He was a son of pharaoh Seqenenre Tao and brother of the last pharaoh of the seventeenth dynasty, Kamose. During his reign, he completed the conquest and expulsion of the Hyksos from the delta region and restored Theban rule over the whole of Egypt.
Ahmose	Princess	17th dynasty	(fl. c. mid-16th century BC)	Daughter of pharaoh Seqenenre Tao by his sister-wife Sitdjehuti. Ahmose was a half-sister of Pharaoh Ahmose I.
Ahmose	Queen	18th dynasty	(fl. c. mid-16th century BC)	Wife of 18th dynasty pharaoh, Thutmose I, and the mother of queen and later, pharaoh, Hatshepsut.
Ahmose	King's son High Priest of Re	18th dynasty	(fl. c. late 15th century BC)	Probably a son of pharaoh Amenhotep II. He was in office as High Priest of Re in Heliopolis during the reign of his brother Thutmose IV.
Ahmose, son of Ebana	Military Commander	17th/18th dynasty	(fl. c. mid to late-16th century BC)	Served in the Egyptian military under the 17th and 18th dynasty pharaohs Seqenenre Tao, Ahmose I, Amenhotep I, and Thutmose I.
Ahmose-ankh	Prince	18th dynasty	(fl. c. mid-16th century BC)	Son of Pharaoh Ahmose I and queen Ahmose Nefertari. He was the crown prince but pre-deceased his father.
Ahmose-Henutemipet	Princess	17th/18th dynasty	(fl. c. late-16th century BC)	Daughter of Pharaoh Seqenenre Tao and probably Queen Ahhotep I. She was the sister of Ahmose I.
Ahmose-Henuttamehu	Princess / Queen	17th/18th dynasty	(fl. c. late-16th century BC)	Daughter of 17th dynasty pharaoh Seqenenre Tao by his sister-wife Ahmose-Inhapi. She was probably married to her half-brother Pharaoh Ahmose I. Ahmose-Henuttamehu was a half-sister to Queen Ahmose-Nefertari.
Ahmose-Inhapi	Princess / Queen	17th dynasty	(fl. c. mid-16th century BC)	Daughter of Pharaoh Senakhtenre Ahmose and was sister to Pharaoh Seqenenre Tao, and the queens Ahhotep I and Sitdjehuti. She was married to her (half-)brother Seqenenre Tao and they had a daughter, Ahmose-Henuttamehu.
Ahmose-Meritamon	Princess	17th dynasty	(fl. c. late-16th century BC)	Probably a daughter of Seqenenre Tao. Her mummy was found in the Deir el-Bahri cache and is now in the Egyptian Museum in Cairo.
Ahmose-Meritamun	Princess / Queen	18th dynasty	(fl. c. late-16th century BC)	Daughter of Ahmose I and Ahmose Nefertari, and was queen of her brother Amenhotep I.
Ahmose-Nebetta	Princess	17th dynasty	(fl. c. mid-16th century BC)	Probably the daughter of Seqenenre Tao and a sister of Ahmose I.
Ahmose Nefertari	Princess / Queen	17th/18th dynasty	(fl. c. mid to late-16th century BC)	Daughter of Seqenenre Tao and Ahhotep I, and royal sister and the wife of pharaoh Ahmose I. Following Ahmose I's death, Ahmose-Nefertari became the regent for her son Amenhotep I and ruled until he was old enough to rule on his own.
Ahmose Pen-Nekhebet	Military Commander	18th dynasty	(fl. c. late-16th to early-15th century BC)	Egyptian official and military commander who started his career under Ahmose I and served all subsequent pharaohs until Thutmose III.
Ahmose Sapair	Prince	17th dynasty	(fl. c. mid-16th century BC)	Probably a son of Pharaoh Seqenenre Tao and a brother of Ahmose I.
Ahmose-Sitamun	Princess	18th dynasty	(fl. c. late-16th century BC)	Daughter of Pharaoh Ahmose I and sister of Amenhotep I. A colossal statue of hers stood before the eighth pylon at Karnak.
Ahmose called Si-Tayit	Viceroy of Kush	18th dynasty	(fl. c. late-16th century BC)	Viceroy of Kush during the reign of Ahmose I. Possibly the first Viceroy to serve in that capacity. Early in the reign of Amenhotep I, the position passed from Si-Tayit to his son Ahmose called Turo.
Ahmose-Sitkamose	Princess / Queen	17th/18th dynasty	(fl. c. late-16th century BC)	Probably the daughter of Pharaoh Kamose. She probably married Ahmose I. Also called Sitkamose.
Ahmose-Tumerisy	Princess	17th dynasty	(fl. c. mid-16th century BC)	Probably a daughter of pharaoh Seqenenre Tao and a sister of Ahmose I.
Ahmose called Turo	Viceroy of Kush	18th dynasty	(fl. c. late-16th century BC)	Viceroy of Kush under Amenhotep I and Tuthmosis I. Son of Ahmose called Si-Tayit.
Akhenaten	Pharaoh	18th dynasty	(reigned c. 1353 BC – c. 1336 BC)	Known before the 5th year of his reign as Amenhotep IV (or Amenophis IV). He abandoned traditional Egyptian polytheism and introducing worship centered on Aten. Also called Echnaton or Akhenaton.
Akhraten	King of Kush		(reigned c. 350 BC – c. 335 BC)	Possibly a son of Harsiotef and a brother of Nastasen. Akhraten may have been succeeded by Nastasen.
Alara of Nubia	King of Kush		(fl. c. early-8th century BC)	Founder of the Napatan royal dynasty and was the first recorded prince of Nubia. He unified all of Upper Nubia from Meroë to the Third Cataract. His successors would comprise the 25th Dynasty of Egypt.
Alexander Helios	Prince	Ptolemaic	(40 BC – c. 29 BC)	Eldest son of queen Cleopatra VII and Roman triumvir Mark Antony.
Amanibakhi	King of Kush		(fl. c. mid-4th century BC)	Kushite King of Meroe. The successor of Akhraten and the predecessor of Nastasen.
Amanineteyerike	King of Kush		(fl. c. late-5th century BC)	Kushite King of Meroe. The son of King Malewiebamani, and brother of Baskakeren. His predecessor Talakhamani was either an older brother or an uncle. His name is also written as Amanneteyerike, Aman-nete-yerike, or Irike-Amannote.
Amasis II	Pharaoh	26th dynasty	(reigned c. 570 BC – c. 526 BC)	Based at Sais and the successor to Apries. Under Amasis II, Egypt's agricultural based economy reached its zenith. He was able to defeat an invasion of Egypt by the Babylonian king Nebuchadrezzar II. Also called Ahmose II.
Amenemhat I	Pharaoh	12th dynasty	(reigned c. 1991 BC – c. 1962 BC)	First ruler of the 12th dynasty. Amenemhat I was a vizier of his predecessor Mentuhotep IV. He moved the capital from Thebes to Itjtawy.
Amenemhat II	Pharaoh	12th dynasty	(reigned c. 1929 BC – c. 1895 BC)	Third pharaoh of the 12th dynasty of Egypt. He was the son of Senusret I through the latter's chief wife, Queen Neferu III.
Amenemhat III	Pharaoh	12th dynasty	(reigned c. 1860 BC – c. 1814 BC)	Sixth king of the 12th dynasty. Son of Senusret III.
Amenemhat IV	Pharaoh	12th dynasty	(reigned c. 1815 BC – c. 1806 BC)	Seventh king of the 12th dynasty. Possibly a son of Amenemhat III.
Amenemhat V Sekhemkare	Pharaoh	13th dynasty	(fl. c. early 18th century BC)	Egyptian king of the 13th Dynasty. He appears as 'Sekhemkare' in the Turin King List.
Amenemhet VI	Pharaoh	13th dynasty	(fl. c. mid-18th century BC)	Seventh king of the Thirteenth Dynasty according to the Turin Canon.
Amenemhat	Nomarch	12th dynasty	(fl. 20th century BCE)	Also known as Ameny, a governor at Men'at Khufu during the reign of pharaoh Senusret I.
Amenemhat	High Priest of Amun	18th dynasty	(fl. c. late-15th century BC)	High Priest of Amun during the reign of pharaoh Amenhotep II.
Amenemhat	Prince	18th dynasty	(fl. c. mid-15th century BC)	Son of Pharaoh Thutmose III. He was the eldest son and appointed heir but predeceased his father.
Amenemhat	Prince	18th dynasty	(fl. c. early-14th century BC)	Son of Pharaoh Thutmose IV. He died young and was buried in his father's tomb.
Amenemhatankh	Prince	12th dynasty	(fl. c. early 19th century BC)	Son of Amenemhat II.
Amenemipet called Pairy	Vizier	18th dynasty	(fl. c. late-15th century BC)	Served during the reigns of Amenhotep II and Thutmose IV.
Amenemnisu	Pharaoh	21st dynasty	(reigned c. 1051 BC – c. 1047 BC)	Second pharaoh of the 21st dynasty. Only ruled 4 years.
Amenemope	Pharaoh	21st dynasty	(reigned c. 1001 BC – c. 992 BC)	Son of Psusennes I and Queen Mutnedjemet. He was the successor to his father, and after c. 9 years of rule, he was succeeded by Osorkon the Elder. AMenemope was buried in Tanis.
Amenemopet	Prince	18th dynasty	(fl. c. late-15th century BC)	Probably a son of Amenhotep II. Known from stela from Giza, and possibly depicted on the stela of the royal nurse Senetruiu.
Amenemopet	Princess	18th dynasty	(fl. c. early-14th century BC)	Probably a daughter of Thutmose IV. Buried with other royal princesses in the Sheikh Abd el-Qurna cache.
Amenemopet	Viceroy of Kush	19th dynasty	(fl. c. early-13th century BC)	Served as Viceroy of Kush during the reign of the 19th dynasty pharaoh Seti I.
Amenemope	Scribe	Ramesside	(fl. c. late-12th century BC)	Amenemope, son of Kanakht, is thought to be the author of the Instruction of Amenemope, an Egyptian text written in the Ramesside Period. His discourses are presented in the traditional form of instructions from father to son on how to live a good and moral life.
Amenhotep I	Pharaoh	18th dynasty	(reigned c. 1526 BC – c. 1506 BC)	Second pharaoh of the 18th dynasty of Egypt. He was the son of Ahmose I and queen Ahmose-Nefertari. He inherited an enlarged kingdom formed by his father's military conquests and maintained dominance over Nubia and the Nile Delta. Also called Amenophis I'.
Amenhotep II	Pharaoh	18th dynasty	(reigned c. 1427 BC – c. 1400 BC)	Son of Thutmose III and Queen Merytre-Hatshepsut. Also called Amenophis II'.
Amenhotep III	Pharaoh	18th dynasty	(reigned c. 1391 BC – c. 1353 BC)	Son of Thutmose IV and queen Mutemwia. His lengthy reign was a period of unprecedented prosperity and artistic splendour, when Egypt reached the peak of her artistic and international power. Also called Amenophis III'.
Amenhotep IV (see Akhenaten)	Pharaoh	18th dynasty		Son of Amenhotep III and Queen Tiye. Changed his name to Akhenaten in the 4th year of his reign.
Amenhotep, son of Hapu	Architect	18th dynasty	(fl. c. mid-14th century BC)	Amenhotep, son of Hapu, was an architect, a priest, a scribe, and a public official, who held a number of offices under Pharaoh Amenhotep III.
Amenhotep	High Priest of Amun	18th dynasty	(fl. c. mid-15th century BC)	High priest in the Temple of Amun.
Amenhotep	High Priest of Amun	20th dynasty	(fl. c. late-12th century BC)	High priest of Amun under the 20th dynasty pharaohs Ramesses IX to Ramesses XI. He was also the vizier and first prophet of Amun-resonther.
Amenhotep	Prince	18th dynasty	(fl. c. late-15th century BC)	Son and possibly the designated heir of Amenhotep II.
Amenhotep Huy	High steward of Memphis	18th dynasty	(fl. c. mid-14th century BC)	High steward of Memphis under Amenhotep III. He was one of the highest officials at the royal court.
Amenhotep-Huy	Vizier	18th dynasty	(fl. c. mid-14th century BC)	Served during the reign of the 18th dynasty pharaoh Amenhotep III. He was also director of Upper and Lower Egypt and overseer of all the works of the King in Upper and Lower Egypt.
Amenia	Noble Woman	18th dynasty	(fl. c. late-14th century BC)	First wife of the pharaoh Horemheb, the last ruler of the 18th dynasty. Amenia died before Horemheb became Pharaoh. Buried in Saqqara.
Amenirdis I Khaneferumut	God's Wife of Amun	25th dynasty	(fl. c. 714 BC – c. 700 BC)	Kushite princess, daughter of Pharaoh Kashta and Queen Pebatjma.
Amenirdis II	Divine Adoratrice of Amun	25th dynasty	(fl. c. 650 BC – c. 640 BC)	Daughter of the Kushite pharaoh Taharqa and was adopted by Shepenupet II, daughter of Piye, to become Divine Adoratrice of Amun.
Amenmesse	Pharaoh	19th dynasty	(reigned c.1202 BC – c.1199 BC)	Possibly the son of Pharaoh Merneptah and Queen Takhat. Amenmesse likely usurped the throne from Seti II, Merneptah's son. The two may have ruled as rivals until Seti II defeated Amenmesse. Also called Amenmesses or Amenmose.
Amenmose	Noble man	18th dynasty	(fl. c. mid-15th century BC)	Egyptian noble who lived during the reigns of the Pharaohs Thutmose III and Amenhotep II.
Amenmose	Prince	18th dynasty	(fl. c. late-16th century BC)	Eldest son and designated heir of Thutmose I. He predeceased his father.
Amenmose	Vizier	19th dynasty	(fl. c. late-13th century BC)	Vizier of Egypt during the reigns of the Pharaohs Amenmesse and Seti II.
Amethu called Ahmose	Vizier	18th dynasty	(fl. c. mid-15th century BC)	Held this position during the reigns of the Pharaohs Thutmose II and Hatshepsut and during the early years of the reign of Thutmose III.
Ameny Qemau	Pharaoh	13th dynasty	(fl. c. mid-18th century BC)	Ruled during the early 13th dynasty. A pyramid in southern Dahshur was constructed for him. Possibly also known as Sehotepibre.
Ammeris	Governor of Sais	26th dynasty	(died c. 695 BCE)	Vassal of Shabaka of the 25th dynasty, installed as governor of Sais by him.
Amun-her-khepeshef	Prince	19th dynasty	(fl. c. 1280 BC – c. 1250 BC)	First-born son of the 19th dynasty Pharaoh Ramesses II and Queen Nefertari. He was the crown prince of Egypt but predeceased his father. His name is also written as Amonhirkhopshef and earlier in his life as Amun-her-wenemef.
Amun-her-khepeshef	Prince	20th dynasty	(fl. c. early-12th century BC)	Eldest son and appointed heir of the 20th dynasty Pharaoh Ramesses III.
Amyrtaeus of Sais	Pharaoh	28th dynasty	(reigned 404 BC – 399 BC)	Only king of the 28th dynasty of Egypt who ruled after the first Persian occupation of Egypt. Amyrtaeus started a revolt against Darius II of Persia in 411 BC and following the death of Darius declared himself king. Amyrtaeus was defeated in a battle with his successor, Nepherites I of Mendes, and executed. Also known as Amenirdisu of Sais.
Analmaye	King of Kush		(fl. c. mid-6th century BC)	Succeeded King Malonaqen and was in turn succeeded by King Amaninatakilebte.
Anat-her	Pharaoh, prince or chieftain	15th or 16th dynasty or contemporaneous with 12th dynasty	(fl. c. late-19th to mid-17th century BC)	Obscur semitic ruler during the second intermediate period. Possibly a vassal of the Hyksos, a Hyksos prince, or a Canaanite chieftain contemporaneous with the 12th dynasty.
Anedjib	Pharaoh	1st dynasty	(fl. c. 30th century BC)	Possibly a son of King Den.
Anen	Second Prophet of Amun	18th dynasty	(fl. c. mid-15th century BC)	Brother of Queen Tiye, the wife of Amenhotep III.
Anhotep	Viceroy of Kush	19th dynasty	(fl. c. 13th century BC)	Viceroy of Kush during the reign of Ramesses II.
Ankh-ef-en-Khonsu i	Priest of Monthu	25th/26th dynasty	(fl. c. mid-8th century BC)	Best known under the name of Ankh-af-na-khonsu, and as the dedicant of the so-called Stela of Revealing
Ankhefensekhmet	High Priest of Ptah	21st dynasty	(fl. c. mid-10th century BC)	Probably served during the reigns of king Psusennes II and king Shoshenq I.
Ankherfenedjef	Prince	4th dynasty	(fl. c. 26th century BC)	Son of Nefermaat, the eldest son of pharaoh Sneferu, and of Itet.
Ankhesenamen	Queen	18th dynasty	(fl. c. late-14th century BC)	Named Ankhesenpaaten at her birth, she was a daughter of the Egyptian Pharaoh Akhenaten and Nefertiti and became queen to her (half-) brother Tutankhamun. Following their marriage, the couple honored the deities of the restored religion by changing their names to Tutankhamun and Ankhesenamen.
Ankhesenpaaten Tasherit	Princess	18th dynasty	(fl. c. mid-14th century BC)	Probably the daughter of Ankhesenamun (who was named Ankhesenpaaten as a princess) and Akhenaten.
Ankhesenpepi I	Queen	6th dynasty	(fl. c. 24th century BC)	Queen consort to Pharaoh Pepi I. Ankhesenpepi was a daughter of Nebet, the female vizier, and her husband Khui. Also called Ankhenesmeryre I.
Ankhesenpepi II	Queen	6th dynasty	(fl. c. 23rd century BC)	Daughter of Nebet, the female vizier, and her husband Khui. Ankhesenpepi II was married to Pharaoh Pepi I and later was a queen to Merenre Nemtyemsaf I. Also called Ankhenesmeryre II.
Ankhesenpepi III	Queen	6th dynasty	(fl. c. 23rd century BC)	Daughter of Nemtyemsaf I and she became the wife of Pepi II.
Ankhesenpepi IV	Queen	6th dynasty	(fl. c. 23rd century BC)	Queen of Pharaoh Pepi II. She was the mother of 7th dynasty king Neferkare II.
Ankhhaf	Prince, Vizier	4th dynasty	(fl. c. 26th century BC)	Egyptian prince who served as vizier and overseer of works for King Khafre. Ankhhaf was a son of pharaoh Sneferu.
Ankhkherednefer	Official	22nd dynasty	(fl. c. mid-9th century BC)	Served under Pharaoh Osorkon II. His name is also written as Ankhrenepnefer and Ankhsherynefer.
Ankhmakis	Local King	Ptolemaic	(fl. early 2nd century BC)	Second king (reigned c.199 BC – c.185 BC) of a dynasty which controlled much of Upper Egypt during the reigns of the Egyptian kings Ptolemy IV and Ptolemy V. His name is also written as: Ankhonnophris, Khaonnophris, Chaonnophris and Ankmachis.
Ankhmare	Prince, Vizier	4th dynasty	(fl. c. 26th century BC)	Son of King Khafre. Served as vizier.
Ankhnesneferibre	God's Wife of Amun	26th dynasty	(fl. c.mid-6th century BC)	Daughter of Psamtik II and his wife Takhuit. She governed Thebes until the Persian conquest of Egypt in 525 BC.
Ankhreshet	Prince	4th dynasty	(fl. c. 26th century BC)	Son of Nefermaat, the eldest son of pharaoh Sneferu, and of Itet. His name is also written as Ankhersheretef.
Ankhtifi	Nomarch of Hierakonpolis	10th/11th dynasty	(fl. c. 22nd century BC)	Nomarch of Hierakonpolis and a supporter of the Herakleopolitan-based 10th dynasty which was locked in conflict with the Theban-based 11th Dynasty kings for control of Egypt.
Ankhu	Vizier	13th dynasty	(fl. c. late 18th century BC)	Vizier during the reigns of King Khendjer and King Sobekhotep II.
Anlamani	King of Kush		(reigned c. 620 BC – c. 600 BC)	During his reign, Kush experienced a revival in its power in the region.
'Apepi	Pharaoh	14th dynasty	(fl. c. mid-17th century BC)	Obscure pharaoh of Canaanite descent reigning in the late 14th Dynasty.
Apepi	Pharaoh	15th dynasty	(fl. c. mid-16th century BC)	Penultimate Hyksos ruler of Lower and Middle Egypt, belonging to the 15th dynasty and reigning towards the end of the Second Intermediate Period. Also known as Ipepi or Apophis.
Aperanat	Pharaoh	15th or 16th dynasty	(fl. c. mid to late 17th century BC)	Semitic ruler of Lower Egypt, easier an early Hyksos king of the 15th Dynasty or a vassal of the Hyksos kings.
Aperel	Vizier	18th dynasty	(fl. c. mid-14th century BC)	Also known as Aperia. He was a vizier of Egypt who served during the reigns of the 18th dynasty pharaohs Amenhotep III and Akhenaten.
Apries Wahibre Haaibre	Pharaoh	26th dynasty	(reigned c. 589 BC – c. 567 BC)	During his reign, a civil war broke out between Egyptian army troops and foreign mercenaries in the Egyptian army. Egyptians turned for support towards a victorious general, Amasis II, who declared himself pharaoh and Apries fled Egypt.
Aramatle-qo	King of Kush		(fl. c. mid-6th century BC)	Also known as Amtalqa, he was a Nubian king who was the son and successor of King Aspelta and Queen Henuttakhbit.
Aristomenes of Alyzia	Regent, Minister	Ptolemaic	(fl. c. early 2nd century BC)	Also known as Aristomenes the Acarnanian. He was regent and chief minister of Egypt in the Ptolemaic period during the reign of the boy king Ptolemy V. Around 196 BC, Ptolemy V took personal control of his kingdom, but Aristomenes remained chief minister until he was removed from power in 192 BC.
Arsinoe I	Queen	Ptolemaic	(c. 305 BC – c. 247 BC)	First wife of Ptolemy II of Egypt. They had three children, including his successor Ptolemy III of Egypt. Around 274 BC, she was accused by Arsinoe II of plotting against him and went in exile.
Arsinoe II	Queen	Ptolemaic	(316 BC–270 BC)	Queen of Thrace, Asia Minor and Macedonia and wife of King Lysimachus, her half-brother Ptolemy Keraunos and later co-ruler of Egypt with her brother and husband King Ptolemy II Philadelphus.
Arsinoe III	Queen	Ptolemaic	(c. 246 BC – 204 BC)	Daughter of Ptolemy III and Berenice II. In 220 BC she married her brother, Ptolemy IV and became queen of Egypt. She reigned 220 BC – 204 BC. She was murdered in a palace coup, shortly after her husband's death.
Arsinoe IV	Queen	Ptolemaic	(c. 68 BC–41 BC)	Daughter of Ptolemy XII Auletes. Arsinoe IV was a half-sister of Cleopatra VII and Ptolemy XIII. When Julius Caesar arrived in Alexandria in 48 BC and sided with Cleopatra VII, Arsinoe escaped from Alexandria but was later captured and taken to Rome. She lived in a temple in Ephesus until Cleopatra VIII arranged for Mark Antony to have her murdered.
Artakama	Queen	Ptolemaic	fl. c. 4th century BC	Second wife of Ptolemy I Soter. Artakama married Ptolemy (then a general) in April 324 BC at the Susa marriage festival as ordered by Alexander the Great.
Ashakhet I	High Priest of Ptah	21st dynasty	(fl. c. mid-11th century BC)	Served as high priest during the reigns of Amenemnisu and possibly Psusennes I.
Ashakhet II	High Priest of Ptah	21st dynasty	(fl. c. mid-10th century BC)	Served during the reigns of King Siamun and King Psusennes II.
Aspelta	King of Kush		(reigned c. 600 BC – c. 580 BC)	Ruler of the kingdom of Kush. Egyptian forces invaded Kush because Pharaoh Psamtik II saw Aspelta as a threat to his authority over Upper Egypt. The capital, Napata, was sacked so Aspelta moved the Nubian capital to Meroë.
Atakhebasken	Queen	25th dynasty	(fl. c. late 8th century BC)	Also known as Akhetbasaken. She was the queen consort to pharaoh Taharqa.
Atlanersa	King of Kush		(reigned c. 656 BC – c. 640 BC)	Nubian king who was the successor of Tantamani, the last ruler of the 25th Nubian dynasty in Egypt. In contrast to his predecessor, Atlanersa's kingdom was restricted to the region of Kush south of Aswan.
Ay Kheperkheprure	Pharaoh	18th dynasty	(reigned c. 1323 BC – c.1319 BC)	Penultimate pharaoh of Egypt's 18th dynasty. He was pharaoh for a brief period, although he was a close advisor to two or three of the pharaohs who reigned before him and was the power behind the throne during Tutankhamun's reign.
(Queen)	Queen	13th dynasty	(fl. c. late-18th century BC)	Possibly the wife of the 13th dynasty king Sobekhotep II.

== B ==
Name	Main title	Dynasty	Date	Comment
Babaef	Vizier	4th dynasty	(fl. c. 26th century BC)	Also known as Khnumbaf. He was a vizier during the reign of king Shepseskaf. He was probably the son of the vizier Duaenre.
Bakenkhonsu	High Priest of Amun	19th dynasty	(c. 1303 BC – c. 1213 BC)	From the time of pharaoh Ramesses II.
Bakenranef	Pharaoh	24th dynasty	(reigned 725 BC – 720 BC)	Also known as Bocchoris. Was briefly a king of the 24th dynasty of Egypt. Based at Sais in the western Delta. Captured and executed by Shabaka, a king of the 25th dynasty.
Bakenrenef	Vizier	26th dynasty	(7th century BCE)	From the time of pharaoh Psamtik I.
Baketwernel	Queen	20th dynasty	(fl. c. late-12th century BC)	Great Royal Wife of Ramesses IX.
Baqet III	Nomarch of Men'at Khufu	11th dynasty	(fl. c. 21st century BCE)	From the time of pharaoh Mentuhotep II.
Baskakeren	King of Kush		(fl. c. late-5th century BC)	King of Kush (reigned c. 405 BC – c. 404 BC) and was probably a son of King Malewiebamani and the younger brother of King Amanineteyerike. He succeeded Amanineteyerike to the throne.
Baufra	Prince	4th dynasty	(fl. c. 26th century BC)	Also known as Baufre or Bauefre. Baufra was a son of Pharaoh Khufu.
Bay Irsu	Chancellor	19th dynasty	(fl. c. late-13th century BC)	Served under pharaoh Seti II and later became an influential powerbroker in the closing stages of the 19th dynasty. Executed.
Bebi	Vizier	11th dynasty	fl. c. 21st century BC	Egyptian vizier under king Mentuhotep II.
Bebiankh	Pharaoh	16th dynasty	fl. c. early-16th century BC	Also known as Seuserenre Bebiankh. The successor of king Semenre.
Bebnum	Pharaoh	14th or 16th dynasty	fl. c. early to mid 17th century BC	Obscur ruler of Lower or Upper Egypt during the Second Intermediate Period. Only known from the Turin King List.
Behenu	Queen	6th dynasty	fl. c. 23rd century BC	Thought to have been the wife of either Pepi I or of Pepi II.
Bek (or Bak)	Royal Sculptor	18th dynasty	fl. c. mid-14th century BC	Chief royal sculptor during the reign of Pharaoh Akhenaten. Bek followed the king to Akhetaten, the city founded by Akhenaten. He oversaw the construction of the great temple statues of the king.
Beketamun	Princess	18th dynasty	(fl. c. mid-15th century BC)	Also known as Beket. A daughter of Pharaoh Thutmose III.
Beketaten	Princess	18th dynasty	(fl. c. mid-14th century BC)	Youngest daughter of Pharaoh Amenhotep III and Tiye and thus the sister of Pharaoh Akhenaten.
Benerib	Queen	1st dynasty	(fl. 31st century BC)	Most likely a wife of pharaoh Hor-Aha, but she was not the mother of his heir, Djer.
Berenice	Princess/Queen	Ptolemaic	(fl. 261 BC – 246 BC)	Also known as Berenice Syra. Daughter of the Egyptian king Ptolemy II Philadelphus and Arsinoe I. She married the Seleucid monarch Antiochus II Theos who divorced his wife, Laodice I. When Antiochus II died, Berenice claimed the regency for her son, Seleucus. However, both Berenice and her son were then killed by Laodice I.
Berenice I	Queen	Ptolemaic	(c. 340 BC – c. 275 BC)	Macedonian noblewoman who, through her marriage to Ptolemy I Soter, became the first queen of the Ptolemaic dynasty of Egypt. Berenice travelled to Egypt as a lady-in-waiting to Eurydice, Ptolemy I's wife. Ptolemy I married Berenice in 317 BC.
Berenice II	Queen	Ptolemaic	(c. 267 BC – c. 221 BC)	Daughter of Magas of Cyrene and Queen Apama II. Her husband, Demetrius the Fair, a Macedonian prince, moved to Cyrene where he became the lover of her mother Apama. So Berenice had him killed in Apama's bedroom. Afterwards she married the Egyptian king, Ptolemy III Euergetes.
Berenice III	Queen	Ptolemaic	(120 – 80 BC)	Ruled jointly with her uncle/husband Ptolemy X Alexander I (101 BC–88 BC). After Ptolemy X died, Ptolemy IX Lathyros reclaimed the throne, but when he died in 81 BC, Berenice took over the throne. The Roman Republic intervened and forced her to marry Ptolemy XI Alexander II, but he had her killed 19 days later.
Berenice IV	Queen	Ptolemaic	(77 BC – 55 BC)	Reigned 57 BC – 55 BC. She was a daughter of Ptolemy XII and Cleopatra V. After Cleopatra V's death, Berenice assumed the throne but was forced to marry Seleucus VII Kybiosaktes. So she had him murdered to remain sole ruler. After Ptolemy XII retook the throne with the aid of Roman soldiers, he had Berenice executed.
Betrest	Queen	1st dynasty	(fl. c. 30th century BC)	Mother of the pharaoh Semerkhet.
Bintanath	Queen	19th dynasty	(fl. c. 13th century BC)	Also known as Bentanath. A daughter and later wife of the 19th dynasty Egyptian Pharaoh Ramesses II.
Buneb	Prince	4th dynasty	(fl. c. 26th century BC)	Son of Nefermaat, the eldest son of pharaoh Sneferu and Itet.
Bunefer	Queen	4th/5th dynasty	(fl. c. 26th century BC)	Her title as a priestess of Shepseskaf means she may have been a wife or daughter of Shepseskaf or she was the wife of king Thamphthis.

== C ==
Name	Main title	Dynasty	Date	Comment
Charmian	Servant to Cleopatra	Ptolemaic	c. 1st century BC	Trusted servant and advisor to the historical Cleopatra VII of Egypt. Died with Cleopatra.
Chephren	Pharaoh	4th dynasty		see Khafre
Cheops	Pharaoh	4th dynasty		see Khufu
Cleomenes of Naucratis	Nomarch	Ptolemaic	c. 4th century BC	Greek of Naucratis in Egypt, was appointed by Alexander III of Macedon as nomarch of the Arabian district of Egypt and receiver of the tributes from all the districts of Egypt and the neighboring part of Africa (331 BC).

== D ==
Name	Main title	Dynasty	Date	Comment
Dakhamunzu	Queen	18th dynasty	(fl. c. 14th century BC)	Also called Dahamunzu. An Egyptian queen known from the Hittite annals The Deeds of Suppiluliuma, which were composed by Suppiluliuma I's son Mursili II. The identity of this queen has not yet been established with any degree of certainty and Dakhamunzu has variously been identified as either Nefertiti, Meritaten or Ankhesenamen.
Dagi	Vizier	11th dynasty	(fl. c. 21st century BC)	Egyptian vizier of the 11th dynasty during the reign of Mentuhotep II.
Dedi	Magician	4th dynasty	(fl. c. 26th century BC)	Soothsayer and magician in an Ancient Egyptian tale set in the era of Khufu, one of a number of stories to be found in the Westcar Papyrus.
Dedumose I	Pharaoh	13th dynasty	(fl. c. mid-17th century BC)	Pharaoh of Egypt during the 13th dynasty. Also known as Tutimaios.
Dedumose II	Pharaoh	16th dynasty	(fl. c. mid-17th century BC)	Native Egyptian king of the 16th Theban dynasty during the Second Intermediate Period. His Horus name was Djedneferre.
Demetrius the Fair	King of Cyrene	Ptolemaic	(c. 285 BC – c.249 BC)	Reigned 250 BC – c. 249 BC. He was a son of King Demetrius I of Macedon and Ptolemais. When the Cyrenaean king Magas died in 250 BC, his widow, Apama II summoned Demetrius from Macedonia to become king of Cyrenaica and marry her daughter Berenice II. Shortly after his marriage to Berenice, Demetrius and Apama became lovers. In a jealous rage, Berenice killed Demetrius. Also known as Demetrius the Handsome.
Den	Pharaoh	1st dynasty	(fl. c. 30th century BC)	Son of Queen Merneith. He was the first to use the title King of the Two Lands, and the first depicted as wearing the double crowns.
Didia	High Priest of Ptah	19th dynasty	(fl. c. mid-13th century BC)	High Priest of Ptah during the reign of the 19th dynasty pharaoh, Ramesses II. Didia succeeded his father Pahemnetjer into the office.
Djaty	Prince	4th dynasty	(fl. c. 26th century BC)	Son of Queen Meresankh II and either pharaoh Djedefre or pharaoh Khafre. Also known as Djati, Zaty, Zati.
Djau	Vizier	6th dynasty	(fl. c. 23rd century BC)	Member of an influential family from Abydos; his mother was the vizier Nebet. His two sisters Ankhesenpepi I and Ankhesenpepi II married Pharaoh Pepi I.
Djedefhor	Prince	4th dynasty	(fl. c. 26th century BC)	Son of Pharaoh Khufu and brother of pharaohs Djedefre and Khafre. Also known as Hordjedef.
Djedefptah	Pharaoh	4th dynasty		see Thamphthis
Djedefre	Pharaoh	4th dynasty	(fl. c. 26th century BC)	Reigned c. 2566 BC – c. 2558 BC, the son and immediate successor of Khufu. Djedefre was the first king to use the title Son of Ra, which is seen as an indication of the growing popularity of the cult of the solar god Ra. Also known as Radjedef.
Djedhor	Pharaoh	30th dynasty	(fl. c. 4th century BC)	Reigned 362–360 BC. He was the son and immediate successor of Nakhtnebef. Also known as Djedher, Takhos and Teos.
Djedi	Prince	4th dynasty	(fl. c. 26th century BC)	Son of Rahotep and Nofret and nephew of the pharaoh Khufu.
Djediufankh	Priest			Ancient Egyptian priest who lived between 2,000 and 4,000 years ago.
Djedkare Isesi	Pharaoh	5th dynasty	Reigned c. 2414 BC – c. 2375 BC	Built his pyramid at Saqqara instead of Abusir. Also referred to as Tancheres.
Djedkare Shemai	Pharaoh	7th dynasty	(fl. c. 22nd century BC)	7th dynasty king of Egypt during the First Intermediate Period.
Djedkhonsuefankh	High Priest of Amun	21st dynasty	(fl. c. mid-11th century BC)	High Priest of Amun in Thebes. He was a son of Pinedjem I and succeeded his brother Masaherta during a time of great turmoil in the city of Thebes.
Djedptahiufankh	Prophet of Amun	22nd dynasty	(fl. c. mid-10th century BC)	Served as the 3rd or 4th Prophet of Amun and was the husband of Nestanebtishru (who was the daughter of Pinudjem II and Neskhons) during the reign of pharaoh Shoshenq.
Djefatnebti	Queen	3rd dynasty	(fl. c. 27th century BC)	Probably a wife of the 3rd dynasty Egyptian king Huni.
Djefatsen	Princess	4th dynasty	(fl. c. 26th century BC)	Daughter of Nefermaat, the eldest son of pharaoh Sneferu and Itet.
Djehuti	Pharaoh	16th dynasty	(fl. c. late-17th century BC)	Egyptian pharaoh belonging to the Theban 16th dynasty based in Upper Egypt during the Second Intermediate period. Also called Djehuty Sekhemresementawy or Thuty.
Djehutihotep	Nomarch of Hermopolis Magna	12th dynasty	(fl. 20th-19th century BCE)	Mainly known for the fine decorations on his tomb depicting how colossal statues were transported.
Djehuty	General	18th dynasty	(fl. c. mid-15th century BC)	General under the Egyptian king Thutmosis III in the 18th dynasty. He led Egyptian forces in the capture of Joffa (modern Jaffa) in Canaan. Also referred to as Thuti or Thutii.
Djehutyemhat	King of Hermopolis Magna	25th dynasty	(fl. late-8th century BCE)	Local pharaoh at Hermopolis Magna, vassal of the 25th dynasty.
Djehutynakht	Nomarch of Hermopolis Magna	11th-12th dynasty	(fl. 21st-20th century BCE)	Known for his large funerary equipment, exhibited at the Boston Museum of Fine Arts.
Djer	Pharaoh	1st dynasty	(fl. c. 31st century BC)	Second or third pharaoh of the 1st dynasty of Egypt.
Djeseretnebti	Queen	3rd dynasty	(fl. c. 27th century BC)	Wife of pharaoh Sekhemkhet from the 3rd dynasty. They were possibly the parents of pharaoh Khaba, Sekhemkhet's successor.
Djet	Pharaoh	1st dynasty	(fl. c. 30th century BC)	Egyptian pharaoh of the 1st dynasty. Also referred to as Wadj, Zet, and Uadji or Uenephes.
Djoser	Pharaoh	3rd dynasty	(reigned c. 2668 BC – c. 2649 BC)	Best-known pharaoh of the 3rd dynasty of Egypt. He commissioned his official, Imhotep, to build the Step Pyramid for him at Saqqara. Also referred to as Netjerikhet, Tosarthros, Zoser, Dzoser, Zozer, Dsr, Djeser, Djésèr, Horus-Netjerikhet, and Horus-Netjerichet.
Double Falcon	King	Predynastic	(fl. c. 32nd century BC)	Predynastic ruler of Lower Egypt.
Duaenhor	Prince	4th dynasty	(fl. c. 26th century BC)	Probably a son of Prince Kawab (son of Khufu) and Hetepheres II.
Duaenre	Vizier	4th dynasty	(fl. c. 26th century BC)	Son of King Khafre and Queen Meresankh III.
Duatentopet (or Tentopet)	Queen	20th dynasty	(fl. c. mid-12th century BC)	Wife of Pharaoh Ramesses IV and mother of Ramesses V.
Duathathor-Henuttawy	Princess / Queen	21st dynasty	(fl. c. early-11th century BC)	Probably the daughter of Ramesses XI, last king of the 20th dynasty, and queen Tentamun. She married Pinedjem I, the Theban High Priest of Amun who effectively ruled Upper Egypt during the reign of Ramesses XI.

== E ==
Name	Main title	Dynasty	Date	Comment
Eratosthenes	Mathematician	Ptolemaic	c. 276 BC – c. 195 BC	Eratosthenes was born in Cyrene (in modern-day Libya). He was the third chief librarian of the Great Library of Alexandria, the center of science and learning in the ancient world, and died in the capital of Ptolemaic Egypt.
Euclid of Alexandria	Mathematician	Ptolemaic	(fl. c. late 4th century BC)	Greek mathematician, known as the "Father of Geometry". He was active in Alexandria during the reign of Ptolemy I. In his best-known work, Elements, Euclid deduced the principles of what is now called Euclidean geometry. Euclid also wrote on perspective, conic sections, spherical geometry, number theory, and rigor.
Eurydice	Queen	Ptolemaic	(fl. c. late 4th century BC)	Daughter of the Macedonian general Antipater and wife of Ptolemy, the son of Lagus, later Ptolemy I of Egypt. She married Ptolemy around 320 BC and was the mother of Ptolemy Keraunos, Meleager, Ptolemais and Lysandra.

== G ==
Name	Main title	Dynasty	Date	Comment
Ganymedes	Tutor of Arsinoe IV, Military Commander	Ptolemaic	(fl. c. 60 BC – 47 BC)	Tutor of Cleopatra VII's half-sister and rival, Arsinoë IV. During the civil war Ganymedes commanded Arsinoës' forces. In 47 BC Caesar won a decisive battle against Ganymedes who perished after fleeing the battle.
Gautseshen	Princess	21st dynasty	(fl. c. late-11th century BC)	Egyptian priestess, daughter of Menkheperre, High Priest of Amun. Her mother was Princess Isetemkheb, a daughter of Pharaoh Psusennes I.
Gemenefkhonsbak	King of Tanis	25th dynasty	(fl. c. early-7th century BCE)	Local pharaoh at Tanis after the fall of the Tanite 22nd dynasty.
Gilukhipa	Queen	18th dynasty	(fl. c. early-14th century BC)	Daughter of Shuttarna II, king of Mitanni. To assist with political relations between the two states, Gilukhipa was sent by Shuttarna II to Egypt to marry the 18th dynasty pharaoh Amenhotep III. Her name is sometimes written as Gilukhipa, Kilu-Hepa, or Kirgipa.

== H ==
Name	Main title	Dynasty	Date	Comment
Ha	Queen (?)	Predynastic	fl. c. 32nd century BC	Possible queen married to Ka during Dynasty 0. Attested by an inscription on a jar from Ka's tomb at Umm El Qa'ab.
Hakor (or Akoris)	Pharaoh	29th dynasty	reigned 393 BC – 380 BC	Overthrew his predecessor Psammuthes. Hakor revolted against his overlord, the Persian King Artaxerxes, and with the support of Athenian mercenaries held off the Persians in a three-year war between 385 and 383 BC.
Hannu	Egyptian noble	11th dynasty	21st to 20th century BC	Served as m-r-pr "majordomus" under Mentuhotep II and Mentuhotep III.
Hapuseneb	High Priest of Amun	18th dynasty	fl. c. mid-15th century BC	High priest from the time of Hatshepsut.
Haremakhet	High Priest of Amun	25th dynasty	fl. 7th century BC	Son of Shabaka and High priest from the time of Tanutamani.
Harkhebi	Astronomer	Ptolemaic	fl. c. 3rd century BC	Astronomer who lived in Ptolemaic Egypt during the rule of the Ptolemaic dynasty.
Harkhuf	Governor	6th dynasty	fl. c. 23rd century BC	Governor of Upper Egypt and overseer of caravans. His primary business was trade with Nubia, forging political bonds with local leaders and preparing the ground for an Egyptian expansion into Nubia. Also known as Herkhuf or Hirkhuf.
Harsiese	High Priest of Ptah	21st dynasty	fl. c. late-11th century BC	Contemporary of Pharaoh Psusennes I.
Harsiese Hedjkheperre Setepenamun	Pharaoh	23rd dynasty	fl. c. mid-9th century BC	King of Thebes during the early years of the reign of 22nd dynasty pharaoh Osorkon II.
Harsiese	High Priest of Amun	22nd dynasty	fl. c. late-9th century BC	High Priest of Amun during the reigns of the pharaohs Osorkon II, Shoshenq III and Pedubast I.
Harsiotef	King of Meroe		fl. c. early 4th-century BC	Kushite King of Meroe (reigned c. 404 BC – c. 369 BC). Probably the son of Queen Atasamale and King Amanineteyerike. His wives were Batahaliye and probably Pelkha.
Harwa	Chief Steward	25th dynasty	c. 8th century BC	Chief Steward of Amenirdis I. His tomb, TT37, is located in El-Assasif, part of the Theban Necropolis, on the West Bank of the Nile, opposite to Luxor.
Hatshepsut	Pharaoh	18th dynasty	reigned c. 1479 BC – c. 1458 BC	Wife of Tuthmose II. Served as regent for her stepson Tuthmose III and eventually had herself depicted as Pharaoh.
Hatshepsut-Merytre	Queen	18th dynasty		see Merytre-Hatshepsut
Hedjetnebu	Princess	5th dynasty	fl. c. 24th century BC	Her father was Pharaoh Djedkare. Also known as Hedjetnub.
Hekenuhedjet	Queen	4th dynasty	fl. c. 26th century BC	Wife of Pharaoh Khafre. Her son was the vizier Sekhemkare.
Hemaka	Royal Seal-bearer	1st dynasty	fl. c. 30th century BC	Important official during the long reign of Pharaoh Den.
Hemetre	Princess	4th dynasty	fl. c. 26th century BC	May have been a daughter or granddaughter of Khafre. She did not hold the title king's wife. She is mainly known from her tomb, which is located in the central field of Giza.
Hemiunu	Prince	4th dynasty	fl. c. 26th century BC	Son of Prince Nefermaat and his wife Itet. He is believed to be the architect of the Great Pyramid of Giza, Egypt.
Henutmehyt	Priestess	19th dynasty	fl. c. mid-13th century BC	Egyptian Theban priestess who lived during the 19th dynasty.
Henutmire	Queen	19th dynasty	fl. c. mid-13th century BC	Princess and queen, one of the eight wives of 19th dynasty pharaoh Ramesses II. Either a daughter or a younger sister of Ramesses II as well as his wife.
Henutsen	Queen	4th dynasty	fl. c. 26th century BC	Daughter of Pharaoh Sneferu and married her elder half-brother Khufu.
Henuttaneb	Princess	18th dynasty	fl. c. mid-14th century BC	Daughter of Egyptian 18th dynasty pharaoh Amenhotep III and Queen Tiye. She was a sister of Pharaoh Akhenaten.
Henut Taui	Priestess	21st dynasty	fl. c. 1000 BCE	Priestess and chantress of Amun at Thebes, mainly known for the alleged traces of cocaine and other New-World drugs on her mummy.
Henuttawy	Princess	19th dynasty	fl. c. mid-13th century BC	Daughter of Pharaoh Ramesses II and Queen Nefertari.
Henuttawy	Princess	21st dynasty	fl. c. mid-11th century BC	Her father was Pinedjem I, High Priest of Amun and de facto ruler of Southern Egypt and her mother was Duathathor-Henuttawy, a daughter of Ramesses XI.
Henuttawy	God's Wife of Amun	20th dynasty	fl. c. early-10th century BC	God's Wife of Amun during the 21st dynasty. Her father was Pinedjem II, High Priest of Amun and her mother was Isetemkheb, Singer of Amun.
Henuttawy C	Chantress of Amun	21st dynasty	fl. c. early-10th century BC	Chantress of Amun during the 21st dynasty. Her father was Menkheperre, High Priest of Amun and her husband was Smendes II, High Priest of Amun.
Henutwati	Queen	20th dynasty	fl. c. mid-12th century BC	Great Royal Wife of Ramesses V. Also known as Ta-Henutwati.
Hepu	Vizier	18th dynasty	fl. c. late-15th century BC	Held office during the reign of Pharaoh Thutmose IV.
Heqaib	Nomarch of Elephantine	6th dynasty	fl. c. 23rd century BCE	Performed several successful expedition in the South under Pepi II. After his death Heqaib was promptly deified.
Heqanakht	Viceroy of Kush	19th dynasty	fl. c. 13th-12th century BC	Viceroy of Kush during the reign of Ramesses II. His titles include: King's son of Kush, overseer of the Southern Lands, Fan-bearer on the king's right, Messenger to every land, etc.
Herihor	General, High Priest of Amun, Pharaoh	20th dynasty	fl. c. early-11th century BC	Egyptian general and High Priest of Amun at Thebes during the reign of Ramesses XI. Herihor played an integral role in restoring order by ousting Pinehesy, viceroy of Nubia, from Thebes. He then assumed a number of titles, from high priest to vizier, before claiming to be pharaoh, although his power base remained limited to Thebes.
Herneith	Queen	1st dynasty	fl. c. 31st century BC	Queen consort to Djer.
Hesy-Ra	Physician, noble man	3rd dynasty	fl. c. 27th century BC	Official, physician and scribe who served under the pharaoh Djoser.
Hetepheres	Princess	4th dynasty	fl. c. 26th century BC	Daughter of pharaoh Sneferu and his half-sister, Queen Hetepheres I. Hetepheres married her younger half-brother Ankhhaf, who was a vizier.
Hetepheres I	Queen	4th dynasty	fl. c. 26th century BC	Daughter of pharaoh Huni, Hetepheres is considered to have been the wife of Sneferu. Hetepheres was the mother of Princess Hetepheres and King Khufu.
Hetepheres II	Queen	4th dynasty	fl. c. 26th century BC	Daughter of Khufu, during his reign she married her brother, the Crown Prince Kawab, with whom she had at least one child, a daughter named Meresankh III.
Hetephernebti	Queen	3rd dynasty	fl. c. 27th century BC	Only known wife of Pharaoh Djoser.
Hewernef	Vizier	20th dynasty	fl. c. early-12th century	Served during the reign of the 20th dynasty pharaoh Ramesses III.
Hor	Pharaoh	13th dynasty	fl. c. mid-18th century	Pharaoh of the 13th dynasty, also called Awibre, known for his intact tomb treasure, in particular his Ka-statue.
Hor-Aha	Pharaoh	1st dynasty	fl. 31st century BC	Probably the second pharaoh of the 1st dynasty of Egypt.
Horbaef	King's Son	4th dynasty	fl. c. 26th century BC	Son of Pharaoh Khufu. He married his half-sister Meresankh II and they had daughters named Nefertkau III and Nebty-tepites. Also known as Baefhor or Horbaf.
Horemheb	Pharaoh	18th dynasty	fl. c. late-14th to early-13th century BC	Last pharaoh of the 18th dynasty (reigned c. 1319 BC – c. 1292 BC). Before he became pharaoh, Horemheb was the commander in chief of the army for Tutankhamen and Ay and the legitimate heir of Tutankhamen. He appointed his vizier Paramessu as his successor, who would assume the throne as Ramesses I.
Hori I	High Priest of Ptah	20th dynasty	fl. c. late-13th century BC	Served at the very end of the reign of the 19th dynasty pharaoh Ramesses II. Hori succeeded Neferronpet in office. Hori was a son of prince Khaemwaset and hence a grandson of Ramesses II.
Hori I	Viceroy of Kush	20th dynasty	fl. c. early-12th century BC	Son of Kama, was Viceroy of Kush under the 19th dynasty pharaoh Siptah. He continued to serve under the 20th dynasty pharaohs Setnakhte and Ramesses III.
Hori II	Vizier	19th/20th dynasty	fl. c. early to mid-12th century BC	Served during the reigns of the 19th and 20th dynasty pharaohs Sethi II, Siptah, Tawosret, Setnakhte and Ramesses III. Hori II was the son of the High Priest of Ptah Hori I and the grandson of Prince Khaemweset.
Hori II	Viceroy of Kush	20th dynasty	fl. c. mid-12th century BC	A son of the Viceroy of Kush, Hori I, and also served as Viceroy of Kush.
Hornakht	King's Son	22nd dynasty	fl. c. mid-9th century BC	Son of pharaoh Osorkon II. He was appointed by his father to the office of chief priest of Amun at Tanis to strengthen Osorkon's authority in Lower Egypt but Hornakht died at age 10.
Horus Bird	Pharaoh	Between the 1st and 2nd dynasties	fl. c. 2900 BC	Ephemeral ruler during the interregnum from the 1st to the 2nd dynasty
Horus Sa	Pharaoh	2nd or 3rd dynasty	fl. c. 27th century BC	Enigmatic pharaoh reigning in the confused mid-2nd dynasty or in the 3rd dynasty.
Hotepibre	Pharaoh	13th dynasty	fl. c. 17th century BC	Hotepibre Siharnedjheritef was likely a son of Ameny Qemau.
Hotepsekhemwy	Pharaoh	2nd dynasty	fl. c. 29th century BC	First king of the 2nd dynasty of Egypt. (or Boethos)
Hsekiu	King	pre-dynastic		Also known as Seka, was a Predynastic ancient Egyptian king who ruled in the Nile Delta.
Hugronaphor	Noble man	Ptolemaic	fl. c. late-3rd century BC	Nubian noble who led Upper Egypt's secession from the rule of Ptolemy IV Philopator in 205 BC. His name is some times given as Hurganophor, Haronnophris, Harmachis, Hyrgonaphor, Herwennefer, or Horwennefer.
Hui	Divine Adoratrice	18th dynasty	fl. c. mid-15th century	Mother of Merytre-Hatshepsut, the Great Royal Wife of Pharaoh Thutmose III.
Hunefer	Priest	19th dynasty	fl. c. 13th century BC	"Scribe of Divine Offerings", "Overseer of Royal Cattle", and steward of Pharaoh Seti I. Known for his copy of the Egyptian funerary Book of the Dead.
Huni	Pharaoh	3rd dynasty	fl. c. 27th century BC	Last pharaoh of Egypt of the 3rd dynasty. He was the successor to Khaba.
Huy	High Priest of Ptah	18th dynasty	fl. c. mid-13th century BC	High Priest of Ptah during the reign of the 19th dynasty pharaoh Ramesses II. Huy was succeeded by Pahemnetjer.
Huya	Steward of Queen Tiye	18th dynasty	fl. c. mid-14th century BC	Superintendent of the Royal Harem, Superintendent of the Treasury and Superintendent of the House, all titles that are associated with Queen Tiye, mother of Akhenaten.

== I ==
Name	Main title	Dynasty	Date	Comment
Inherkhau	Foreman of the lord of the two lands	20th dynasty	12th century BC	Foreman and supervisor of the workers of the king
Iaret	Queen	18th dynasty	fl. c. early-14th century BC	Daughter of Pharaoh Amenhotep II and wife of Thutmose IV.
Ibi	Steward	26th dynasty	fl. c. mid-7th century BC	Chief Steward to the Adorer of the God, Nitocris I, during the reign of Pharaoh Psamtik I. His name is sometimes written as Aba or Abe.
Ibiau	Pharaoh	13th dynasty	fl. c. 17th century BC	Ibiau, Ibiaw or Wahibre Ibiau was an Egyptian king of the 13th Dynasty.
Ibiaw	Vizier	13th dynasty	fl. c. 17th century BC	Vizier under pharaohs Wahibre Ibiau and Merneferre Ay.
Imhotep	Architect, Vizier	3rd dynasty	fl. c. 27th century BC	Served under King Djoser as chancellor to the pharaoh and High Priest of Re at Heliopolis. He was revered by later Egyptian dynasties as an architect, engineer, physician, poet and philosopher.
Imyremeshaw	Pharaoh	13th dynasty	fl. c. late-18th century BC	Imyremeshaw Smenkhkare was an Egyptian king of the 13th dynasty.
Inaros	Rebel Leader	Persian Occupation	fl. c. mid-5th century BC	Egyptian rebel ruler who was the son of a Libyan prince named Psamtik. In 460 BC, he revolted against the Persians with the help of his Athenian allies and defeated the Persian army. He was defeated in 454 BC by a Persian army led by Megabyzus. Inaros was captured and executed in 454 BC. Also known as Ienheru, or Inarus.
Inenek-Inti	Queen	6th dynasty	fl. c. 24th century BC	Wife of Pharaoh Pepi I Meryre of the 6th dynasty.
Ineni (or Ini)	Queen	13th dynasty	fl. c. mid-17th century BC	Her husband was probably king Merneferre Ay.
Ineni	Architect	18th dynasty	fl. late-16th and early 15th century BC	Egyptian architect and government official of the 18th dynasty, responsible for major construction projects under the pharaohs Amenhotep I, Thutmose I, Thutmose II, Hatshepsut and Thutmose III. Ineni expanded the Temple of Karnak and probably oversaw the construction of Amenhotep I's tomb and mortuary temple.
Inetkawes	Princess	3rd dynasty	fl. c. 27th century BC	Only known child of Pharaoh Djoser and Queen Hetephernebti.
Ini Menkheperre	Local King	Third Intermediate Period	fl. c. mid-8th century BC	Probably pharaoh Rudamun's successor at Thebes but was not a member of his predecessor's 23rd dynasty. Unlike the 23rd dynasty rulers, he was a local king who ruled only at Thebes. Also known as Iny Si-Ese Meryamun.
Inkaef	Prince	4th dynasty	fl. c. 26th century BC	Son of Nefermaat, the eldest son of pharaoh Sneferu and Itet.
Intef the Elder	Pharaoh	11th dynasty	c. mid-22nd century BC	Nomarch of Thebes during the first intermediate period, later considered a founding figure of the 11th dynasty.
Intef I	Pharaoh	11th dynasty	fl. c. 22nd century BC	Intef I Sehertawy was local Egyptian ruler at Thebes, Egypt. He was the first of his dynasty to assume the title of Pharaoh. His authority was contested by the other nomarchs of Egypt, but he had gained control over Koptos, Dendera and the three nomes of Hierakonpolis by the end of his reign.
Intef II	Pharaoh	11th dynasty	reigned c. 2118 BC – c. 2069 BC	Intef II Wahankh's capital was located at Thebes, Egypt. After the death of the nomarch Ankhtifi, Intef II was able to unite all the southern nomes down to the First Cataract. By the time Intef II died, he left behind a strong government in Thebes which controlled the whole of Upper Egypt.
Intef III	Pharaoh	11th dynasty	reigned c. 2069 BC – c. 2060 BC	Intef III Nakhtnebtepnefer was a king during the First Intermediate Period.
Intef V	Pharaoh	13th dynasty	fl. c. late-18th century BC	Intef V Sehetepkare was an Egyptian king. His name is also written as Antef V or Inyotef V.
Intef VI	Pharaoh	17th dynasty	fl. c. early-16th century BC	Intef VI Sekhemrewepmaat ruled from Thebes. He lived during the Second Intermediate Period, when Egypt was ruled by multiple kings. His name is also written as Antef VI.
Intef VII	Pharaoh	17th dynasty	fl. c. mid-16th century BC	Intef VII Nubkheperre ruled from Thebes during the Second Intermediate Period, when Egypt was divided by rival dynasties including the Hyksos in Lower Egypt. He was the brother of Intef VI and perhaps the son of Sekhemre Shedtawy Sobekemsaf I. His name is also written as Antef VII.
Intef VIII	Pharaoh	17th dynasty	fl. c. mid-16th century BC	Intef VIII Sekhemreheruhirmaat ruled during the Second Intermediate Period, when Egypt was divided between the Theban-based 17th dynasty in Upper Egypt and the Hyksos 15th dynasty who controlled Lower and part of Middle Egypt. His name is also written as Antef VIII.
Intef	General	11th dynasty	fl. c. 21st century BC	Served under king Mentuhotep II.
Intefiqer	Vizier	12th dynasty	fl. c. mid-20th century BC	Egyptian noble who was overseer of the city and vizier under the Pharaohs Amenemhet I and Senusret I.
Ipu	Royal Nurse	18th dynasty	fl. c. late-16th century BC	Mother of Queen Satiah, Great Royal Wife of Pharaoh Thutmose IV.
Iput	Queen	5th/ 6th dynasty	fl. c. 24th century BC	Daughter of Unas, the last king of 5th dynasty of Egypt. She married Teti, the first pharaoh of the 6th dynasty of Egypt. Their son was Pepi I Meryre and she acted for him as a regent after her husband's death.
Iput II	Queen	6th dynasty	fl. c. 23rd century BC	Wife of king Pepi II Neferkare.
Iry-Hor	Pharaoh	Predynastic	fl. c. 32nd century BC	Predynastic ruler of Egypt, earliest king of Egypt known by name. Ruled Upper Egypt at least as far north as Memphis.
Isesi-ankh	High official	5th dynasty	fl. c. 24th century BC	High official, Overseer of all the works of the King, Overseer of the expedition, Royal companion. Possibly A son of king Djedkare Isesi.
Isesu	Princess	4th dynasty	fl. c. 26th century BC	Daughter of Nefermaat, the eldest son of pharaoh Sneferu and Itet.
Iset	Queen	18th dynasty	fl. c. mid-15th century BC	Secondary wife or concubine of Thutmose II. Iset was the mother of Thutmose III, the only son of Thutmose II.
Iset	Princess	18th dynasty	fl. c. late-15th century BC	Daughter of Pharaoh Thutmose III and his Great Royal Wife Merytre-Hatshepsut.
Iset	Princess-Queen	18th dynasty	fl. c. mid-14th century BC	Daughter of Amenhotep III and Tiye. She was a sister of Akhenaten. She later married her father.
Iset	Princess, God's Wife of Amun	20th dynasty	fl. c. mid-12th century BC	Daughter of Pharaoh Ramesses VI and Nubkhesbed, and a sister of Pharaoh Ramesses VII. Also known as Aset, or Isis.
Iset Ta-Hemdjert	Queen	20th dynasty	fl. c. mid-12th century BC	Wife of Ramesses III and the mother of both Ramesses IV and Ramesses VI.
Isetemkheb	Princess	21st dynasty	fl. c. late 11th century BC	Sister-wife of the Theban High Priest of Amun, Pinudjem II. Isetemkheb was a daughter of the Theban High Priest of Amun and general, Prince Menkheperre, and his wife, Isetemkheb.
Isetnofret I	Queen	19th dynasty	fl. c. mid-13th century BC	One of the wives of Pharaoh Ramesses II and was the mother of his heir, Merneptah. Alternatively called: Isis-nofret or Isitnofret.
Isetnofret II	Queen	19th dynasty	fl. c. late-13th century BC	One of the wives of Pharaoh Merneptah. Alternatively called: Isis-nofret or Isitnofret.
Isidorus	Priest	Roman Period	fl. c. 2nd century AD	Native ancient Egyptian priest. He led the native Egyptian revolt against Roman rule during the reign of emperor Marcus Aurelius.
Isu	Prince	4th dynasty	fl. c. 26th century BC	Son of Nefermaat, the eldest son of pharaoh Sneferu and Itet.
Itet	Princess	4th dynasty	fl. c. 26th century BC	Noblewoman, a wife of Prince Nefermaat, and daughter-in-law of pharaoh Sneferu. Her name is also written as Atet.
Itisen	Prince	4th dynasty	fl. c. 26th century BC	Son of Nefermaat, the eldest son of pharaoh Sneferu, and of Itet.
Itu	Prince	4th dynasty	fl. c. 26th century BC	Son of Prince Rahotep and Nofret and grandson of pharaoh Sneferu.
Iufaa	Priest	26th dynasty	fl. c. 5th century BC	Egyptian priest and administer of palaces. His undisturbed tomb was found in 1994.
Iufni	Pharaoh	13th dynasty	c. 1790 BC or 1740 BC	Only record of this Pharaoh comes from the Turin King List.
Iunmin I	Vizier	4th dynasty	fl. c. 26th century BC	Possibly a son of king Khafre and served as vizier during the reign of his brother, Menkaure. His name is also written as Yunmin, Iuenmin, and Minuen.
Iunre	Prince	4th dynasty	fl. c. 26th century BC	Son of king Khafre. His name is also written as Yunre.
Iuput	High Priest of Amun	22nd dynasty	fl. c. mid-10th century BC	Served during the reigns of his father Pharaoh Shoshenq I and his brother Osorkon I. He was also general, army commander and governor of Upper Egypt.
Iuput I	Pharaoh	23rd dynasty	fl. c. late-9th century BCE	Pharaoh of Upper Egypt and a co-regent with his father, Pedubast I.
Iuput II	Local Ruler	Third Intermediate Period	fl. c. mid-8th century BC	Ruler of Leontopolis in the Egyptian Delta region. He was an ally of Tefnakht of Sais who resisted the invasion of Lower Egypt by the 25th dynasty Kushite king Piye. After Piye defeated Tefnakht's coalition and conquered Lower Egypt, Iuput II remained in power as the local governor of Leontopolis. Also known as Yuput II.
Iuty	Vizier	Late New Kingdom		Tomb in Bubastis
Iuwelot	High Priest of Amun	22nd dynasty	fl. c. early-9th century BCE	High Priest of Amun at Thebes under the pharaohs Osorkon I and Takelot I.
Iyibkhentre	Pharaoh	11th-12th dynasty	fl. early-20th century BCE	Egyptian or Nubian pretender to the throne, he was an opponent of Amenemhat I but was defeated by him.
Iymeru	Vizier	13th dynasty	fl. 18th century BC	Vizier under pharaohs Khendjer and Imyremeshaw.
Iynefer	Prince	4th dynasty	fl. c. 26th century BC	Son of pharaoh Sneferu.

== K ==
Name	Main title	Dynasty	Date	Comment
Kaaper	Priest	4th-5th Dynasty	fl. 25th-26th century BC	Also called Sheikh el-Beled, he was a priest and scribe known for his wooden statue from Saqqara
Ka (pharaoh)	King	Pre-dynastic	fl. c. 32nd-31st century BC	Ka, also Sekhem Ka or Ka-Sekhen, was a Predynastic pharaoh of Upper Egypt.
Kaemqed	Prince	4th dynasty	fl. c. 26th century BC	Son of princess Nefertnesu and grandson of Pharaoh Sneferu.
Kaemsekhem	Director of the Palace	4th dynasty	fl. c. 26th century BC	Son of prince Kawab and Hetepheres II and grandson of the pharaoh Khufu. He served as the director of the palace.
Kagemni I	Vizier	3rd dynasty	fl. c. 27th century BC	Vizier to both Pharaoh Huni and Pharaoh Sneferu.
Kagemni (II)	Vizier	6th dynasty	fl. c. 24th century BC	Vizier during the reign of king Teti. Kagemni's wife Nebtynubkhet Sesheshet was probably the daughter of Teti.
Kakhent	Prince	4th dynasty	fl. c. 26th century BC	Son of Nefermaat, the eldest son of pharaoh Sneferu and Itet.
Kamose	Pharaoh	17th dynasty	fl. c. mid-16th century BC	Last king of the Theban 17th dynasty (reigned c.1555 BC – c.1550 BC). He was probably the son of Seqenenre Tao and Ahhotep I and brother of Ahmose I, founder of the Eighteenth Dynasty.
Kanefer	Prince	4th dynasty	fl. c. 26th century BC	Son of pharaoh Sneferu.
Kapes	Queen	22nd dynasty	fl. c. early 9th century BC	Wife of pharaoh Takelot I and the mother of Pharaoh Osorkon II.
Karomama	Queen	22nd dynasty	fl. c. mid-10th century BC	Wife of pharaoh Sheshonk I and the mother of Pharaoh Osorkon I. Her name is sometimes given as Karamat
Karomama I	Queen	22nd dynasty	fl. c. mid-9th century BC	Wife of pharaoh Osorkon II. Karomama was probably a daughter of Pharaoh Takelot I.
Karomama II	Queen	23rd dynasty	fl. c. mid-9th century BC	Wife of pharaoh Takelot II. Karomama was a daughter of the High Priest of Amun Nimlot and his wife Tentsepeh. Karomama was the mother of pharaoh Osorkon III.
Karomama Meritmut	God's Wife of Amun	22nd dynasty	fl. c. mid-9th century BC	God's Wife of Amun during the 22nd dynasty. Possibly a daughter of Pharaoh Osorkon II.
Kashta	King of Kush	Second Intermediate Period	fl. c. mid-8th century BC	King of the Kushite Dynasty (reigned c. 760 BC – c. 752 BC). Kashta ruled Nubia and he also exercised a strong degree of control over Upper Egypt. During his reign, the native Kushite population adopted Egyptian traditions, religion and culture.
Kawab	Prince	4th dynasty	fl. c. 26th century BC	Eldest son of Pharaoh Khufu and Queen Meritites I and half-brother of pharaohs Djedefre and Khafre.
Kekheretnebti	Princess	5th dynasty	fl. c. 24th century BC	Daughter of Pharaoh Djedkare Isesi.
Keminub	Queen	12th dynasty or Second Intermediate Period	fl. c. late-20th century BC	Egyptian noblewoman with the title king's wife who was buried next to the pyramid of the 12th dynasty pharaoh Amenemhet II at Dahshur. For that reason it has been suggested she was his wife. May date to a later period however.
Khaba	Pharaoh	3rd dynasty	fl. c. 27th century BC	Pharaoh of the 3rd dynasty, possibly succeeded Sanakht, may be the owner of the Layer Pyramid.
Khabash	Noble	Persian Occupation	fl. mid-4th century BC	Noble based at Sais in Lower Egypt. During the second Persian occupation of Egypt (343–332 BC) he led a revolt against the Persian rule with his eldest son. During the 330s BC, Khabash led an invasion into the kingdom of Kush but was defeated by king Nastasen. Also known as Khababash.
Khabaw	Pharaoh	13th dynasty	fl. c. early- to mid-18th century BC	Pharaoh of the 13th dynasty, successor and possible son of Hor Awibre.
Khabekhnet	Artisan	19th dynasty	fl. c. late-13th century BC	Served during the reigns of the pharaoh Ramesses II.
Khaemtir	Vizier	19th dynasty	fl. c. late-13th century BC	Served during the reigns of the pharaohs Amenmesse and Seti II.
Khaemweset	Prince	18th dynasty	fl. c. early-14th century BC	Probably the son of Pharaoh Amenhotep II.
Khaemweset	Prince, High Priest of Ptah	19th dynasty	fl. c. late-13th century BC	Son of Ramesses II and queen Isetnofret. He was a Sem-Priest and later High Priest of Ptah and governor of Memphis. Khaemwaset restored the monuments of earlier kings, such as Shepseskaf, Sahure and Nyuserre Ini, and restored the pyramid of Unas at Saqqara.
Khaemweset	Prince, High Priest of Ptah	20th dynasty	fl. c. early-12th century BC	Son of Pharaoh Ramesses III. He was a priest of Ptah in Memphis.
Khaemwaset	Vizier	20th dynasty	fl. c. late-12th century BC	Vizier under king Ramesses IX, ordered and led investigation about some royal tomb robberies.
Khafre	Pharaoh	4th dynasty	fl. c. 26th century BC	Reigned c.2558 BC – c.2532 BC. He was a brother of Djedefre. Khafre had his capital at Memphis and built the second largest pyramid at Giza and is thought to have built the Great Sphinx.
Khamerernebty	Princess	5th dynasty	fl. c. 25th century BC	Daughter of the 5th dynasty King Nyuserre Ini and was married to the King's vizier, Ptahshepses.
Khamerernebty I	Queen	4th dynasty	fl. c. 26th century BC	Probably a wife of the pharaoh Khafre and the mother of Menkaura and Khamerernebty II.
Khamerernebty II	Queen	4th dynasty	fl. c. 26th century BC	Probably the daughter of Pharaoh Khafre and Queen Khamerernebty I and was married to her brother Menkaura.
Khamudi	Pharaoh	15th dynasty	fl. c. mid-16th century	Last pharaoh of the Hyksos 15th dynasty of Egypt (reigned c.1555 BC – c.1544 BC), who ruled in the northern portion of Egypt. He was defeated by the founding pharaoh of the 18th dynasty, Ahmose I.
Khasekhemwy	King	2nd dynasty	fl. c. 27th century BC	Thought to be the last king of the 2nd dynasty of Egypt. He led several significant military campaigns and built several monuments, still extant, mentioning war against the Northerners.
Khawy	Guardian in the Place of Truth	19th dynasty	fl. c. mid-13th century BC	Guardian in the Place of Truth and servitor of Amun of Opet (Luxor) during the reign of Egyptian pharaoh, Ramesses II.
Khay	Vizier	19th dynasty	fl. c. mid-13th century BC	Vizier in the latter part of pharaoh Ramesses II. Khay was the son of Hai and Nub-em-niut.
Khayu	King	Pre-dynastic		Predynastic ancient Egyptian king who ruled in the Nile Delta.
Khedebneithirbinet I	Queen	26th dynasty	fl. c. late-7th century BC	Probably the wife of the 26th dynasty pharaoh Necho II. She was the mother of his successor, Psamtik II.
Khendjer Userkare	Pharaoh	13th dynasty	fl. c. late 18th century BC	Earliest known Semitic king of an Egyptian dynasty.
Khenemetneferhedjet I Weret	Queen	12th dynasty	fl. c. early-19th century BC	Wife of King Senusret II and the mother of Senusret III.
Khenemetneferhedjet II Weret	Queen	12th dynasty	fl. c. mid-19th century BC	Wife of King Senusret III.
Khenemetneferhedjet III	Queen	12th dynasty	fl. c. late-19th century BC	Wife of King Amenemhet III.
Khensa	Queen	25th dynasty	fl. c. mid-8th century BC	Sister-wife of the Pharaoh Piye. Her name is sometimes written as Khenensaiuw.
Khentetka	Queen	4th dynasty	fl. c. 26th century BC	Wife of the pharaoh Djedefra.
Khenthap	Queen	1st dynasty	fl. c. 31st century BC	Mother of Djer and was probably the wife of King Hor-Aha.
Khentimeresh	Prince	4th dynasty	fl. c. 26th century BC	Son of Nefermaat, the eldest son of pharaoh Sneferu, and Itet.
Khentkaus I	Queen	4th dynasty	fl. c. 25th century BC	Daughter of Menkaure, possibly a wife of Shepseskaf and mother of Userkaf.
Khentkaus II	Queen	5th dynasty	fl. c. 25th century BC	Wife of Egyptian Pharaoh Neferirkare Kakai. She was the mother of Neferefre and Nyuserre Ini.
Khentkaus III	Queen	5th dynasty	fl. c. 25th century BC	Wife of Egyptian Pharaoh Neferefre. She was the mother of Menkauhor.
Khenut	Queen	5th dynasty	fl. c. 24th century BC	Wife of King Unas.
Khety I	Nomarch of Asyut	10th dynasty	fl. c. 21st century BCE	Nomarch of Asyut, loyal to the pharaohs of Herakleopolis.
Khety II	Nomarch of Asyut	10th dynasty	fl. c. 21st century BCE	Nomarch of Asyut under king Merykare, grandson of the namesake above.
Kheti	Treasurer	11th dynasty	fl. c. 21st century BCE	Treasurer under king Mentuhotep II.
Kheti	Vizier	12th dynasty	fl. c. late-19th century BC	Vizier under king Amenemhet III.
Khnumhotep	Royal Manicurist	5th dynasty		Overseer of the Manicurists in the Palace of King Niuserre. Shares a tomb with Niankhkhnum.
Khnumhotep I	Nomarch of Men'at Khufu	12th dynasty	fl. c. early-20th century BCE	Nomarch of Men'at Khufu under pharaoh Amenemhat I.
Khnumhotep II	Nomarch of Men'at Khufu	12th dynasty	fl. c. 20th-19th century BCE	Nomarch of Men'at Khufu under Amenemhat II and Senusret II, known for his remarkable tomb at Beni Hasan.
Khnumhotep III	Vizier	12th dynasty	fl. c. early-19th century BC	Son of the local governor Khnumhotep II, and was promoted high steward and then vizier under Senusret II.
Khufu	Pharaoh	4th dynasty	fl. c. 26th century BC	Second pharaoh of the 4th Dynasty (reigned c.2589 BC – c.2566 BC). He is generally accepted as being the builder of the Great Pyramid of Giza. Greek name: Cheops.
Khufukhaf	Vizier	4th dynasty	fl. c. 26th century BC	Son of Pharaoh Khufu and brother of pharaohs Djedefre and Khafre. His mother might have been Queen Henutsen. His wife was Nefertkau II and she was buried with him in Giza.
Khui	Pharaoh	8th dynasty	fl. c. 22nd century BCE	Local pharaoh mainly known for his purported tomb, the so-called Pyramid of Khui in Middle Egypt.
Khuiqer	Pharaoh	n.d.	n.d.	Extremely poorly known pharaoh, tentatively attributed to various dynasties from the First to the Second Intermediate Period.
Khuit I	Queen	5th dynasty	fl. c. 25th century BC	Possibly the wife of Pharaoh Menkauhor Kaiu.
Khuit (II)	Queen	6th dynasty	fl. c. 24th century BC	Wife of King Teti.
Khyan	Pharaoh	15th dynasty	fl. c. early-16th century BC	King of the Hyksos 15th dynasty of Egypt. Also known as Seuserenre Khyan, Khian' or Khayan.
Kiya	Queen	18th dynasty	fl. c. mid-14th century BC	One of the wives of Pharaoh Akhenaten.

== L ==
Name	Main title	Dynasty	Date	Comment
Ladice	Queen	26th dynasty	fl. c. 6th century BC	Daughter of the Greek Cyrenaean King Battus III and his wife Queen Pheretima. Ladice married Amasis II.

== M ==
Name	Main title	Dynasty	Date	Comment
Maathorneferure	Queen	19th dynasty	fl. c. mid-13th century BC	Daughter of the Hittite king Hattusili III and his wife Queen Pudukhepa. She was a sister of Hittite king Tudhaliya IV. Maathorneferure married the Egyptian 19th dynasty Pharaoh Ramesses II.
Maatkare Mutemhat	God's Wife of Amun	21st dynasty	fl. c. mid to late-11th century BC	Daughter of High Priest of Amun, Pinedjem I, who was the de facto ruler of Southern Egypt from 1070 BC onwards.
Maatkare	Queen	21st dynasty	fl. c. late-10th century BC	Wife of pharaoh Osorkon I and the mother of pharaoh Sheshonk II. Maatkare was a daughter of Psusennes II.
Magas of Cyrene	King of Cyrene	Ptolemaic	fl. c. mid-3rd century BC	Following the death of Ptolemy I, Magas tried to gain independence for Cyrene, until he crowned himself king around 276 BC. Magas and Antiochus agreed on a joint attack on Egypt but the armies of Ptolemy II defeated them. Magas managed to maintain Cyrene's independence until his death.
Mahu (noble)	Noble	18th dynasty	fl. c. 14th century BC	Chief of Police at Akhetaten.
Maia (or Matia)	Wet-Nurse	18th dynasty	fl. c. mid-14th century BC	Wet-nurse of the Egyptian 18th dynasty king Tutankhamun.
Maiherpri	Noble	18th dynasty	fl. c. late 15th century BC	Egyptian noble of Nubian origin. He probably lived during the rule of the 18th dynasty king Thutmose IV. He probably grew up in the royal nursery as a prince of a vassal territory and as an adult was an advisor or bodyguard to the pharaoh.
Malewiebamani	King of Kush		fl. c. mid-5th century BC	Kushite King of Meroe (reigned c.463 BC – c.435 BC). Malewiebamani's mother was probably Queen Saka'aye. Malewiebamani was the son of either Nasakhma (whom he succeeded) or Siaspiqa.
Manetho	Historian, Priest	Ptolemaic	fl. c. mid-3rd century BC	Egyptian historian and priest from Sebennytos who lived during the Ptolemaic era. He was probably a priest of the sun god Ra at Heliopolis. Manetho wrote the Aegyptiaca (History of Egypt) which is of great interest to Egyptologists and used as evidence for the chronology of the reigns of pharaohs.
Masaharta	High Priest of Amun	21st dynasty	fl. c. mid-11th century BC	Succeeded his father, Pinedjem I, who had also been the de facto ruler of Upper Egypt from 1070 BC. Masaharta's mother was Duathathor-Henuttawy, the daughter of Ramesses XI.
Maya	High Priest of Amun	18th dynasty	fl. c. mid-14th century BC	High Priest of Amun during the reign of king Akhenaten.
Maya	Treasurer	18th dynasty	fl. c. late-14th century BC	Overseer of the Treasury during the reign of the pharaohs Tutankhamun, Ay and Horemheb. Maya collected taxes and performed other services such as supervising the preparation of their tombs.
Mehytenweskhet	Queen	26th dynasty	fl. c. mid-7th century BC	Daughter of the High Priest of Re Harsiese, and the Great Royal Wife of pharaoh Psamtik I. Mehytenweskhet was the mother of Necho II, the Divine Adoratrice of Amun Nitocris I and a daughter, Meryetneith.
Meketaten	Princess	18th dynasty	fl. c. mid-14th century BC	Daughter of Pharaoh Akhenaten and his wife Nefertiti.
Meketre	Treasurer	11th dynasty	fl. c. 21st century BC	Chancellor (treasurer) and chief steward during the reign of the 11th dynasty Egyptian kings Mentuhotep II and Mentuhotep III.
Menches	Village scribe	Ptolemaic	fl. late 2nd century BC	Village scribe of Kerkeosiris whose archived papyri were discovered at Tebtunis.
Menes also Meni	Pharaoh	1st dynasty	fl. 31st century BC	Legendary pharaoh of the early dynastic period, credited by classical tradition with having united Upper and Lower Egypt, and being the founder of the 1st dynasty of Egypt. Mainstream consensus identifies him with Narmer.
Menhet	Queen	18th dynasty	fl. c. mid-15th century BC	Minor foreign-born wife of pharaoh Thutmose III who was buried in a lavishly furnished rock-cut tomb in Wady Gabbanat el-Qurud.
Menkare	Pharaoh	7th dynasty	fl. c. 22nd century BC	May have been a 7th dynasty king of Egypt during the First Intermediate Period.
Menkauhor Kaiu	Pharaoh	5th dynasty	fl. c. 25th century BC	May have been a son of king Niuserre. Queen Meresankh IV and Queen Khuit I may have been consorts for Menkauhor. Menkauhor's successor, Djedkare Isesi, may have been his son.
Menkaure	Pharaoh	4th dynasty	fl. c. 26th century BC	Reigned c. 2532 BC – c. 2503 BC, and ordered the construction of the third and smallest of the Pyramids of Giza. His chief queen was Khamerernebty II. He was the successor of Khafre.
Menkheperraseneb I	High Priest of Amun	18th dynasty	fl. c. mid-15th century BC	High Priest of Amun during the reign of pharaoh Thutmose III. He was possibly the uncle of Menkheperreseneb II.
Menkheperreseneb II	High Priest of Amun	18th dynasty	fl. c. mid-15th century BC	High Priest of Amun, Superintendent of the Gold and Silver Treasuries and Chief of the Overseers of Craftsmen. He served during the reign of pharaoh Thutmose III.
Menkheperre	Prince	18th dynasty	fl. c. mid-15th century BC	One of two known sons of Pharaoh Thutmose III and his wife Merytre-Hatshepsut.
Menkheperre	High Priest of Amun	21st dynasty	fl. c. late-11th century BC	Son of pharaoh Pinedjem I and queen Henuttawy. He was the High Priest of Amun at Thebes and de facto ruler of southern Egypt. Menkheperre married his niece Isetemkheb, daughter of his brother Psusennes I and wife Wiay.
Menna	Artisan, Scribe	18th dynasty	fl. c. early-14th century BC	Egyptian artisan and "Scribe of the Fields of the Lord of the Two Lands" probably during the reign of the 18th dynasty king Thutmose IV.
Mentuherkhopshef	Prince,	20th dynasty	fl. c. 12th century BC	One of the sons of Ramesses III and Iset Ta-Hemdjert
Mentuherkhepeshef	Prince	20th dynasty	fl. c. late-12th century BC	Egyptian prince during the 20th dynasty, a son of Pharaoh Ramesses IX.
Mentuhotep	Treasurer	12th dynasty	fl. c. late-20th century BC	Egyptian official and treasurer under the 12th dynasty pharaoh Senusret I.
Mentuhotep	Queen	16th dynasty	fl. c. late-17th century BC	Possibly the queen consort of the pharaoh Djehuti Sekhemresementawy.
Mentuhotep I	Pharaoh	11th dynasty	fl. c. 22nd century BC	Local Egyptian prince at Thebes who became the first acknowledged ruler of the 11th dynasty by assuming the title of first supreme chief of Upper Egypt and, later, declaring himself king over all Egypt.
Mentuhotep II Nebhepetre	Pharaoh	11th dynasty	fl. c. 21st century BC	Son of Intef III and Iah. His wife was Tem. His only known son was Mentuhotep III. He was able to effectively reunite ancient Egypt for the first time since the 6th dynasty.
Mentuhotep III Sankhkare	Pharaoh	11th dynasty	fl. c. 21st century BC	Continued the building program of his father Mentuhotep II.
Mentuhotep IV Nebtawyre	Pharaoh	11th dynasty	fl. c. 20th century BC	Last king of the Egyptian 11th Dynasty (reigned c. 1997 BC – c. 1991 BC).
Mentuhotep V Sewedjara	Pharaoh	13th dynasty	fl. c. late-18th century BC	Pharaoh of Egypt in the 13th dynasty.
Mentuhotep VI Sankhenre	Pharaoh	16th dynasty	fl. c. late-17th century BC	Pharaoh of Egypt of the 16th Theban dynasty based in Upper Egypt during the Second Intermediate Period. His predecessor was Sekhemre Sankhtawy Neferhotep III. Mentuhotep VI was succeeded by Nebiriau I.
Mentuhotepi	Pharaoh	16th or 17th dynasty	fl. c. 1630 BC	Pharaoh during the fragmented second intermediate period ruling over little more than Thebes itself.
Menwi	Queen	18th dynasty	fl. c. mid-15th century BC	Minor foreign-born wife of the 18th dynasty Egyptian pharaoh Thutmose III who was buried in a lavishly furnished rock-cut tomb in Wady Gabbanat el-Qurud.
Merdjefare	Pharaoh	14th dynasty	fl. c. early-17th century BC	One of the few attested pharaohs of the 14th dynasty, reigning from Avaris over the eastern Nile Delta.
Merefnebef	Vizier	6th dynasty	fl. c. 24th century BC	First served at the court of the pharaoh Teti, possibly became vizier during the reign of Userkare, and was dismissed during the reign of Pepi I. (or Unisankh and Fefi)
Merenhor	Pharaoh	7th dynasty	fl. c. 22nd century BC	May have been a 7th dynasty king of Egypt during the First Intermediate Period.
Merenre Nemtyemsaf I	Pharaoh	6th dynasty	fl. c. 23rd century BC	Son of Pepi I and Ankhesenpepi I.
Merenre Nemtyemsaf II	Pharaoh	6th dynasty	fl. c. 22nd century BC	Briefly king during the 6th dynasty of Egypt (reigned c. 2184 BC – c. 2183 BC), succeeding his long-lived father Pepi II Neferkare.
Mereret	Princess	4th dynasty	fl. c. 26th century BC	Daughter of Rahotep and Nofret and niece of pharaoh Khufu.
Mereruka	Vizier	6th dynasty	fl. c. 24th century BC	Vizier to the pharaoh Teti and married Teti's daughter, Hert-watet-khet.
Meresamun	Priestess		fl. c. 8th century BC	Ancient Egyptian singer-priestess in the inner sanctum at the temple in Karnak.
Meresankh I	Queen	3rd dynasty	fl. c. 27th century BC	Possibly a lesser wife of pharaoh Huni. Meresankh was the mother of the 4th dynasty pharaoh Sneferu.
Meresankh II	Queen	4th dynasty	fl. c. 26th century BC	Daughter of Khufu and Queen Meritites I. She was probably married her half-brother Djedefre, but it is also possible she married the pharaoh Khafre.
Meresankh III	Queen	4th dynasty	fl. c. 26th century BC	Daughter of Hetepheres II and Prince Kawab. She married king Khafre.
Meresankh IV	Queen	5th dynasty	fl. c. 25th century BC	Could have been queen to king Menkauhor Kaiu or Djedkare Isesi.
Meret-Isesi	Princess	5th dynasty	fl. c. 24th century BC	Her father was Pharaoh Djedkare.
Meretseger	Queen	12th dynasty	fl. c. mid-19th century BC	Probably the wife of Senusret III. She was the first Egyptian queen consort to bear the title Great Royal Wife, which became the standard title for chief wives of pharaohs.
Merhotepre Ini	Pharaoh	13th dynasty	fl. c. mid-17th century BC	Son and successor of Merneferre Ay and a king of the late 13th dynasty of Egypt.
Merikare	Pharaoh	21st dynasty	fl. c. 21st century BC	Pharaoh during the 10th dynasty of Egypt who controlled territories based around Herakleopolis.
Meritamen	Princess	18th dynasty	fl. c. mid-15th century BC	Daughter of Pharaoh Thutmose III and Merytre-Hatshepsut.
Meritamen	Queen	19th dynasty	fl. c. mid-13th century BC	Daughter and later Great Royal Wife of the 19th dynasty pharaoh Ramesses II. Her name is also written as Meritamun, Merytamen, Merytamun, and Meryt-Amen.
Meritaten	Princess-Queen	18th dynasty	fl. c. mid-14th century BC	Wife of pharaoh Smenkhkare. Meritaten was a daughter of pharaoh Akhenaten and queen Nefertiti. Meritaten also may have ruled as pharaoh in her own right under the name, Ankhkheperure Neferneferuaten.
Meritaten Tasherit	Princess	18th dynasty	fl. c. mid-14th century BC	Probably the daughter of Meritaten, the eldest daughter of Pharaoh Akhenaten.
Meritites I	Queen	4th dynasty	fl. c. 26th century BC	Daughter of Sneferu. Meritites married her elder half-brother the pharaoh Khufu.
Meritites II	Princess	4th dynasty	fl. c. 26th century BC	Daughter of pharaoh Khufu and his younger half-sister Meritites I. She married Akhethotep, who was a Director of the Palace.
Meritites IV	Queen	6th dynasty	fl. c. 24th century BC	Wife of king Pepi I.
Merkare	Pharaoh	13th dynasty	fl. c. mid-17th century BC	Poorly known pharaoh of the late 13th dynasty during the second intermediate period.
Merkheperre	Pharaoh	13th dynasty	fl. c. mid-17th century BC	Poorly known pharaoh of the late 13th dynasty during the second intermediate period.
Merneferre Ay	Pharaoh	13th dynasty	fl. c. mid-17th century BC	Longest reigning king of the 13th Dynasty.
Merneith	Queen	1st dynasty	fl. c. 30th century BC	Queen consort and a regent of Egypt during the 1st dynasty. She may have been a ruler of Egypt in her own right. She was king Djet's senior royal wife and the mother of Den.
Merneptah	Pharaoh	19th dynasty	fl. c. mid to late-13th century BC	Son of Ramesses II. Merneptah had to carry out several military campaigns during his reign, including against the Libyans, who he defeated with the assistance of the Sea Peoples.
Merenptah	Prince	19th dynasty	fl. c. mid-13th century BC	Egyptian prince during the 19th dynasty, who was probably the son of the pharaoh Merenptah.
Merti	Queen	18th dynasty	fl. c. mid-15th century BC	Minor foreign-born wife of the 18th dynasty Egyptian pharaoh Thutmose III who was buried in a lavishly furnished rock-cut tomb in Wady Gabbanat el-Qurud.
Meru	Official	11th dynasty	fl. c. 21st century BC	Egyptian official under king Mentuhotep II during the 11th dynasty. Meru was overseer of sealers at the royal court and therefore one of the highest state officials.
Meryatum	High Priest of Re	19th dynasty	fl. c. mid-13th century BC	Egyptian prince and High Priest of Re, the son of the 19th dynasty pharaoh Ramesses II and Nefertari.
Meryatum II	High Priest of Re	20th dynasty	fl. c. mid-12th century BC	Egyptian prince and High Priest of Re. He was a son of the 20th dynasty pharaoh Ramesses III.
Meryhathor	Pharaoh	10th dynasty	fl. c. 22nd century BCE	Possibly the founder of the Herakleopolite 10th dynasty.
Meryibre Khety	Pharaoh	9th dynasty	fl. c. 22nd century BCE	Likely the founder of the Herakleopolite 9th dynasty, thus the Greek Achthoes. Also known as Meryibtawy.
Merymose	Viceroy of Kush	18th dynasty	fl. c. mid-14th century BC	Viceroy of Kush under Amenhotep III. He served for almost the entire four decades of that reign.
Meryptah	High Priest of Amun	18th dynasty	fl. c. mid-14th century BC	High Priest of Amun during the reign of the 18th dynasty pharaoh Amenhotep III.
Meryre	High Priest of the Aten	18th dynasty	fl. c. mid-14th century BC	Hereditary Noble and High Official and Fan-bearer on the Right Side of the King which emphasised his close relationship to the 18th dynasty king Akhenaten.
Meryre II	Steward	18th dynasty	fl. c. mid-14th century BC	Superintendent to the 18th dynasty Egyptian queen Nefertiti and was also Royal Scribe, Steward and Overseer of the Two Treasuries and of the Royal Harem of Nefertiti.
Merysekhmet	Vizier	19th Dynasty	fl. c. late-13th century BC	Served during the reign of the 19th dynasty pharaoh Merenptah.
Meryteti	Vizier	6th Dynasty	fl. c. 24th century BC	Served as vizier to Pepi I. He was the son of the vizier Mereruka. His mother was princess Sesheshet Watetkhetor.
Merytre-Hatshepsut	Queen	18th Dynasty	fl. c. mid-15th century BC	Wife of pharaoh Thutmose III and the mother of Amenhotep II. She was the daughter of a priestess Hui.
Mesehti	Nomarch of Asyut	11th Dynasty	fl. c. 2000 BCE	Known for his tomb in Asyut and particularly for the several soldier models within.
Mesen-ka	Prince	2nd Dynasty	fl. c. late 27th century BC	Son of a king of the late 2nd Dynasty or early 3rd Dynasty.
Mindjedef	Prince	4th Dynasty	fl. c. 26th century BC	Probably a son of Prince Kawab and Hetepheres II. He was a grandson of Pharaoh Khufu.
Minkhaf I	Vizier	4th dynasty	fl. c. 26th century BC	Son of Pharaoh Khufu. His mother may have been Queen Henutsen. He served as vizier during his father's reign.
Minkhaf II	Nobleman	4th dynasty	fl. c. 26th century BC	Great-nephew of Minkhaf I and great-grandson of Khufu.
Minmontu	High Priest of Amun	18th dynasty	fl. c. mid-16th century BC	High Priest of Amun during the reign of Ahmose I, an 18th dynasty king of Egypt.
Minmose	Overseer of the Works	18th dynasty	fl. c. late-15th century BC	Overseer of works for the 18th dynasty pharaohs Thutmose III and Amenhotep II and took part in expeditions to Syria and Nubia.
Minnefer	Supervisor of Palace Attendants, Overseer of Messengers	5th dynasty		Known from a statue.
Mutbenret	Princess	18th dynasty	fl. c. mid-14th century BC	Egyptian noblewoman and possibly the sister of the 18th dynasty Great Royal Wife Nefertiti. (or Benretmut)
Mutemwiya	Queen	18th dynasty	fl. c. early-14th century BC	Minor wife of the 18th dynasty Egyptian king Thutmose IV and the mother of Amenhotep III.
Muthis	Pharaoh	29th dynasty	fl. c. early-4th century BCE	Maybe an ephemeral pharaoh usurper of the 29th dynasty.
Mutnedjmet	Queen	18th dynasty	fl. c. late-14th century BC	Also known as Mutnedjemet, Mutnodjmet, and Mutnodjemet. She was the Great Royal Wife of Horemheb, the last king of the 18th dynasty.
Mutnedjmet	Queen	21st dynasty	fl. c. late-11th century BC	Great Royal Wife of her brother, Psusennes I, and was the mother of Pharaoh Amenemope. She was the daughter of the High Priest of Amun, Pinedjem I.
Mutnofret	Queen	18th dynasty	fl. c. late-16th century BC	Queen of Thutmose I, and the mother of Thutmose II. She was probably a daughter of Ahmose I and a sister of Amenhotep I.

== N ==
Name	Main title	Dynasty	Date	Comment
Nakht	Astronomer	18th dynasty	fl. c. 14th century BC	Served during the reign of Tuthmose IV. Buried in TT52
Nakhthoreb	Pharaoh	30th dynasty		See Nectanebo II
Nakhtmin	General	18th dynasty	fl. c. mid-14th century BC	General during the reign of Pharaoh Tutankhamun. Nakhtmin may have been the son and heir of Pharaoh Ay but died before the end of the Ay's reign.
Nakhtnebef	Pharaoh	30th dynasty		See Nectanebo I
Nakhtneith	Queen	1st dynasty	fl. c. 31st century BC	Wife to king Djer.
Nakhtpaaten (or Nakht)	Vizier	18th dynasty	fl. c. mid-14th century BC	Vizier of Pharaoh Akhenaten. Nakhtpaaten succeeded the vizier Ramose in office. Known from his tomb in Amarna.
Nakhtubasterau	Queen	26th dynasty	fl. c. mid-6th century BC	Wife of pharaoh Amasis II. Name also written as Nakhtbastetiru.
Naparaye	Queen	25th dynasty	fl. c. late-8th century BC	Naparaye was the daughter of King Piye and the sister-wife of King Taharqa.
Narmer	Pharaoh	1st dynasty	fl. c. 31st century BC	Pharaoh who is thought to be the successor to the proto-dynastic pharaohs Scorpion and/or Ka, and possibly the unifier of Egypt and founder of the 1st dynasty, and therefore the first pharaoh of all Egypt.
Nasakhma	King of Kush		fl. c. mid-5th century BC	Kushite King of Meroe. He was the successor to king Siaspiqa. (or Nasakhmaqa)
Nastasen	King of Kush		fl. c. late-4th century BC	King of Kush (reigned c. 335 BC – c. 310 BC). Probably the son of King Harsiotef and Queen Pelkha and his wife may have been Sekhmakh. Nastasen defeated an invasion of Kush from Upper Egypt led by a local ruler, Khabbash.
Nauny	Princess	21st dynasty	fl. c. mid-11th century BC	Also known as Nany or Entiuny. She was probably a daughter of High Priest, later Pharaoh Pinedjem I.
Nebamun	Vizier	18th- 19th dynasty	fl. c. early to mid-13th century BC	Vizier during the late 18th and early 19th dynasties of Egypt. He held that office from the reign of Horemheb to the reign of Ramesses II.
Nebankh	High steward	13th dynasty	c. 1730 BC	Royal acquaintance and high steward during the reigns of Neferhotep I and Sobekhotep IV of the mid 13th Dynasty.
Nebemakhet	Prince	4th dynasty	fl. c. 26th century BC	Son of pharaoh Khafre and queen Meresankh III. He was Chief Justice and Vizier to the pharaoh Menkaure.
Nebet	Queen	5th dynasty	fl. c. 24th century BC	Wife of king Unas.
Nebet	Vizier	6th dynasty	fl. c. 24th century BC	Female vizier who held the office during the reign of Pepi I. Nebet's two daughters, Ankhesenpepi I and Ankhesenpepi II married Pepi I. She was married to Khui and their son Djau was a vizier.
Nebetah	Princess	18th dynasty	fl. c. mid-14th century BC	Daughter of Amenhotep III and wife Tiye. She was a younger sister of Akhenaten.
Nebetia	Princess	18th dynasty	fl. c. mid-14th century BC	Granddaughter of Pharaoh Thutmose IV and the daughter of Prince Siatum.
Nebetiunet	Princess	18th dynasty	fl. c. mid-15th century BC	Daughter of Pharaoh Thutmose III and his wife Merytre-Hatshepsut.
Nebetnehat	Queen	18th dynasty	fl. c. 14th century BC	Queen of an unidentified Pharaoh. Her name is only known from an alabaster canopic fragment found in the valley of the Queens.
Nebettawy	Princess- Queen	19th dynasty	fl. c. mid-13th century BC	Daughter and a Great Royal Wife of pharaoh Ramesses II.
Nebiriau I Sewadjenre	Pharaoh	16th dynasty	fl. c. early-16th century BC	Also known as Nebiryerawet I. A pharaoh of the 16th Theban dynasty based in Upper Egypt during the Second Intermediate Period.
Nebiriau II	Pharaoh	16th dynasty	fl. c. 19th century BC	Also known as Nebiryerawet II. A pharaoh of the 16th Theban dynasty based in Upper Egypt during the Second Intermediate Period.
Nebit	Vizier	16th dynasty	fl. c. early-16th century BC	Ancient Egyptian official under king Senusret III.
Nebkaure Khety	Pharaoh	9th dynasty	fl. c. 22nd century BC	Pharaoh of the Herakleopolite 9th dynasty, also mentioned on The Eloquent Peasant.
Nebmaatre	Pharaoh	16th or 17th dynasty	fl. c. early-16th century BC	Obscur pharaoh of the early 17th dynasty during the Second Intermediate Period.
Nebmaatre	Prince, High Priest of Re	20th dynasty	fl. c. late-12th century BC	High Priest of Re in Heliopolis. He was probably a son of Ramesses IX.
Nebneteru Tenry	High Priest of Amun	19th dynasty	fl. c. early-13th century BC	High Priest of Amun under pharaoh Seti I. Nebneteru's wife, Merytre, was Chief of the Harem of Amun.
Nebnuni	Pharaoh	13th dynasty		See Nebnun(i) Semenkare.
Nebre	Pharaoh	2nd dynasty		See Raneb.
Nebsenre	Pharaoh	14th Dynasty	fl. c. early 17th century BC	Obscure king of the 14th Dynasty, attested by a single inscription on a jar and the Turin canon.
Nebtawy	Chantress of Amun	18th dynasty		Buried with her husband, Roy, a scribe, in Theban Tomb TT255
Nebtu	Queen	18th Dynasty	fl. c. mid-15th century BC	Wife of the 18th dynasty king, Thutmose III.
Nebtyemneferes	Princess	5th dynasty	fl. c. 24th century BC	Daughter of Pharaoh Djedkare.
Nebty-tepites	Princess	4th dynasty	fl. c. 26th century BC	Nebty-tepites was a daughter of Prince Horbaef and his half-sister Meresankh II. After Horbaef's death, Meresankh married either the pharaoh Djedefra or the pharaoh Khafre.
Nebwawy	High Priest of Osiris	18th dynasty	fl. c. 15th century BCE	High Priest of Osiris under the pharaohs Hatshepsut, Thutmose III and Amenhotep II.
Nebwenenef	High Priest of Amun	19th dynasty	fl. c. early-13th century BC	High Priest of Amun at the beginning of the reign of Ramesses II. Prior to that, Nebwenenef had served as High Priest of Anhur and High Priest of Hathor during the reign of Seti I.
Neby	Pharaoh	7th dynasty		See Neferkare Neby.
Necho I	King of Sais	26th dynasty	fl. c. mid-7th century BC	Also known as Nekau I. Governor of the Egyptian city of Sais. He was the first attested local Saite king of the 26th dynasty of Egypt (reigned c. 672 BC–c. 664 BC). He was killed by an invading Kushite force under Tantamani.
Necho II	Pharaoh	26th dynasty	fl. c. late-7th century BC	Also known as Nekau II (reigned c. 610 BC–c. 595 BC). Following the collapse of the Assyrian Empire, the Babylonians under Nebuchadrezzar II fought the armies of Pharaoh Necho II. The Egyptians were defeated and eventually expelled from Syria.
Nectanebo I	Pharaoh	30th dynasty	reigned 380 BC – 362 BC	Also known as Nekhtnebef. Nectanebo deposed and killed Nefaarud II, starting the last dynasty of Egyptian kings. He spent much of his reign defending his kingdom against Persian reconquest but still erected many monuments and temples.
Nectanebo II	Pharaoh	30th dynasty	reigned 360 BC – 343 BC	Also known as Nakhthoreb, the last king of the 30th dynasty and the last native Egyptian ruler in antiquity. He was placed on the throne by the Spartan king Agesilaus II, who helped him overthrow Teos and fight off a rival pretender. Nectanebo II was defeated by the Persian king Artaxerxes III, and went into exile in Nubia. Egypt once again became a satrapy of the Persian Empire.
Nedjeftet	Queen	6th dynasty	fl. c. 24th century BC	Wife of pharaoh Pepi I.
Nedjem	Prince	18th dynasty	fl. c. late-15th century BC	Son of Pharaoh Amenhotep II.
Nedjemib	Princess	4th dynasty	fl. c. 26th century BC	Daughter of Rahotep and Nofret and niece of pharaoh Khufu.
Nedjemibre	Pharaoh	13th dynasty	fl. c. early- to mid-18th century BC	Ephemeral ruler of the 13th dynasty during the Second Intermediate Period. Known only from the Turin canon.
Neferefre	Pharaoh	5th dynasty	fl. c. 25th century BC	Also known as Raneferef. He reigned c. 2460 BC – c. 2453 BC.
Neferetnebty	Queen	5th dynasty	fl. c. 25th century BC	Wife of pharaoh Sahure. Her name is sometimes written as Neferet-ha-Nebti, or Neferetnebti.
Neferhetepes	Princess	4th dynasty	fl. c. 26th century BC	Daughter of Pharaoh Djedefre.
Neferhotep	Scribe	13th dynasty	fl. c. mid-18th century BC	13th dynasty Egyptian official and scribe.
Neferhotep I	Pharaoh	13th dynasty	fl. c. late-18th century BC	Son of a Theban military family and brother of King Sobekhotep IV.
Neferhotep III Sekhemre Sankhtawy	Pharaoh	16th dynasty	fl. c. late-17th century BC	King during the Theban 16th Dynasty.
Neferirkare	Pharaoh	8th dynasty	fl. c. 22nd century BC	Reigned c. 2161 BC – c. 2160 BC, during the First Intermediate Period.
Neferirkare Kakai	Pharaoh	5th dynasty	fl. c. 25th century BC	Reigned c. 2477 BC – c. 2467 BC. He married Queen Khentkaus II.
Neferkahor	Pharaoh	7th dynasty	fl. c. 22nd century BC	May have been a 7th dynasty king of Egypt during the First Intermediate Period.
Neferkamin	Pharaoh	7th dynasty	fl. c. 22nd century BC	May have been a 7th dynasty king of Egypt during the First Intermediate Period.
Neferkamin Anu	Pharaoh	8th dynasty	fl. c. 22nd century BC	May have been an 8th dynasty king of Egypt during the First Intermediate Period.
Neferkara I	Pharaoh	8th dynasty	fl. c. 22nd century BC	May have been a 7th dynasty king of Egypt during the First Intermediate Period.
Neferkare II	Pharaoh	7th dynasty	fl. c. 22nd century BC	May have been a 7th dynasty king of Egypt during the First Intermediate Period.
Neferkare III	Pharaoh	9th dynasty	fl. c. 22nd century BC	King during the 9th dynasty of Egypt controlling territories based around Herakleopolis.
Neferkare Iymeru	Vizier	13th dynasty		Egyptian vizier under king Sobekhotep IV.
Neferkare Khendu	Pharaoh	7th dynasty	fl. c. 22nd century BC	May have been a 7th dynasty king of Egypt during the First Intermediate Period.
Neferkare Neby	Pharaoh	7th dynasty	fl. c. 22nd century BC	May have been a 7th dynasty king of Egypt during the First Intermediate Period. His mother was probably Queen Ankhesenpepi II and his father was probably Pepi II Neferkare.
Neferkare Pepiseneb	Pharaoh	8th dynasty	fl. c. 22nd century BC	May have been an 8th dynasty king of Egypt during the First Intermediate Period.
Neferkare Tereru	Pharaoh	7th dynasty	fl. c. 22nd century BC	May have been a 7th dynasty king of Egypt during the First Intermediate Period.
Neferkare VII	Pharaoh	9th dynasty	fl. c. 22nd century BCE	Third pharaoh of the 9th dynasty.
Neferkare VIII	Pharaoh	10th dynasty	fl. c. late-22nd century BCE	Second pharaoh of the 10th dynasty.
Neferkare	King of Tanis	26th dynasty	fl. c. mid-7th century BCE	Last local ruler of Tanis who finally submitted himself to Psamtik I of the 26th dynasty.
Neferkau	Prince	4th dynasty	fl. c. 26th century BC	Son of Rahotep and Nofret and nephew of pharaoh Khufu.
Neferkauhor	Pharaoh	8th dynasty	fl. c. 22nd century BC	Reigned c. 2163 BC–c. 2161 BC, during the First Intermediate Period.
Neferkaure II	Pharaoh	8th dynasty	fl. c. 22nd century BC	Reigned c. 2167 BC–c. 2163 BC, during the First Intermediate Period.
Nefermaat I	Vizier	4th dynasty	fl. c. 26th century BC	Son of pharaoh Sneferu. He was a vizier and was a half-brother of Khufu. Nefermaat's wife was Itet.
Nefermaat II	Vizier	4th dynasty	fl. c. 26th century BC	Vizier during the reign of his cousin pharaoh Khafre. Nefermaat was a son of Princess Nefertkau .
Neferneferuaten Ankhkheperure	Pharaoh	18th dynasty	fl. c. mid-14th century BC	Female Egyptian pharaoh (reigned c.1335 BC – c.1333 BC) toward the end of the Amarna era during the 18th Dynasty. She was probably a daughter of pharaoh Akhenaten.
Neferneferuaten Tasherit	Princess	18th dynasty	fl. c. mid-14th century BC	Daughter of Pharaoh Akhenaten and his Great Royal Wife Nefertiti.
Neferneferure	Princess	18th dynasty	fl. c. mid-14th century BC	Daughter of Pharaoh Akhenaten and Great Royal Wife Nefertiti.
Neferronpet	Vizier	19th dynasty	fl. c. mid-13th century BC	Egyptian vizier and a High Priest of Ptah during the reign of pharaoh Ramesses II.
Nefersheshemre called Seshi	Vizier	6th dynasty	fl. c. 24th century BC	Vizier during the early to middle part of the reign of the 6th dynasty Egyptian pharaoh Teti.
Nefertari	Queen	18th dynasty	fl. c. late-15th century BC	First Great Royal Wife of Pharaoh Thutmose IV.
Nefertari	Queen	19th dynasty	fl. c. mid-13th century BC	Also known as Nefertari Merytmut, one of the Great Royal Wives of pharaoh Ramesses II.
Neferthenut	Queen	12th dynasty	fl. c. mid-19th century BC	Probably the wife of pharaoh Senusret III.
Nefertiabet	Princess	4th dynasty	fl. c. 26th century BC	Daughter of Pharaoh Khufu and sister of Hetepheres II and Khafre.
Nefertiti	Queen	18th dynasty	fl. c. mid-14th century BC	Great Royal Wife of Pharaoh Akhenaten. Nefertiti is also known for her bust which was attributed to the sculptor Thutmose.
Nefertkau I	Princess	4th dynasty	fl. c. 26th century BC	Daughter of pharaoh Sneferu and a half-sister to Khufu.
Nefertkau II	Princess	4th dynasty	fl. c. 26th century BC	Wife and sister of Prince Khufukhaf I, son of the 4th dynasty pharaoh Khufu.
Nefertkau III	Princess	4th dynasty	fl. c. 26th century BC	Probably a daughter of Meresankh II and Prince Horbaef. She was married to an official named Iynefer.
Nefertnesu	Princess	4th dynasty	fl. c. 26th century BC	Daughter of pharaoh Sneferu and she was a half-sister to pharaoh Khufu.
Neferu III	Queen	12th dynasty	fl. c. mid-20th century BC	Daughter of Amenemhat I, wife of her brother, Senusret I, and the mother of Amenemhat II.
Neferuptah	Princess	12th dynasty	fl. c. late-19th century BC	Also known as Ptahneferu, a daughter of the Egyptian king Amenemhat III of the 12th dynasty. Her sister was the Pharaoh Sobekneferu.
Neferure	Princess	18th dynasty	fl. c. early-15th century BC	Daughter of two pharaohs, Hatshepsut and Thutmose II. She served in high offices in the Egyptian government and the religious administration.
Nefrubity	Princess	18th dynasty	fl. c. early-15th century BC	Sometimes called Akhbetneferu. She was the daughter of Pharaoh Thutmose I and Ahmose, the sister of Hatshepsut and the half-sister of Thutmose II.
Nehesy	Pharaoh	14th dynasty	fl. c. late-18th century BC	Ruler during the 14th dynasty of Egypt of the Second Intermediate Period.
Nehi	Viceroy of Kush	18th dynasty		In office under Thutmose III.
Neith	Queen	6th dynasty	fl. c. 23rd century BC	One of the queens of the 6th dynasty pharaoh Pepi II. Neith was probably a daughter of the pharaoh Pepi I and queen Ankhesenpepi I, making her half-sister to pharaoh Pepi II. Neith may be the mother of pharaoh Nemtyemsaf II.
Neithhotep	Queen	1st dynasty	fl. c. 31st century BC	Queen of Egypt, and likely wife of Narmer.
Neitiqerty Siptah	Pharaoh	6th dynasty	fl. c. 22nd century BC	Reigned c. 2183 BC – c. 2181 BC, and was an obscure successor to Merenre Nemtyemsaf II towards the end of the 6th dynasty of Egypt.
Nekauba	Pharaoh	26th dynasty	fl. c. mid-7th century BC	Reigned c. 678 BC – c. 672 BC during the 26th Saite dynasty of Egypt.
Nemtyemsaf I	Pharaoh	6th dynasty		see Merenre Nemtyemsaf I
Nemtyemsaf II	Pharaoh	6th dynasty		see Merenre Nemtyemsaf II
Nepherites I	Pharaoh	29th dynasty	reigned 399 BC – 393 BC	Also known as Nefaarud I. He founded the 29th dynasty of Egypt by defeating and then executing Amyrtaeus. Nepherites was a native of Mendes, which he made his capital. He supported Sparta in its war against the Persians by supplying them with grain and ship building material.
Nepherites II	Pharaoh	29th dynasty	reigned 380 BC	Also known as Nefaarud II, a pharaoh of Egypt. Following the death of his father Hakor, he was the last pharaoh of the 29th dynasty. He was deposed and killed by Nectanebo I after ruling Egypt for only 4 months.
Nerikare	Pharaoh	13th dynasty	fl. c. early-18th century BC	Short-lived pharaoh of the 13th dynasty.
Neserkauhor	Prince	5th dynasty	fl. c. 24th century BC	Son of Djedkare Isesi.
Nesitanebetashru	Noble Woman	21st dynasty	fl. c. early-10th century BC	Daughter of the Egyptian nobleman and High Priest of Amun, Pinedjem II, and his wife Neskhons.
Nesitanebetashru	Queen	22nd dynasty	fl. c. mid-9th century BC	Wife of Sheshonk II and the mother of Pharaoh Harsiese. She was also a Chantress of Amun.
Nesitaudjatakhet	Queen	22nd dynasty	fl. c. 9th century BC	Wife of Pharaoh Sheshonk II and the mother of Prince Osorkon D.
Neskhons	Princess	21st dynasty	fl. c. late-11th century BC	Daughter of Smendes II and Takhentdjehuti, and wed her paternal uncle, High Priest Pinedjem II.
Neterkheperre Meryptah called Pipi II	High Priest of Ptah	21st dynasty	fl. c. early-10th century BC	High Priest of Ptah during the reigns of the pharaohs Psusennes I, Amenemope, Osochor and Siamun.
Netjeraperef	Prince	4th dynasty	fl. c. 26th century BC	Son of the Egyptian pharaoh Sneferu. He was a half-brother of Khufu and nephew to Hetepheres I.
Netjerkare	Pharaoh	7th dynasty	fl. c. 22nd century BC	May have been a 7th dynasty king of Egypt during the First Intermediate Period.
Nikare	Pharaoh	7th dynasty	fl. c. 22nd century BC	May have been a 7th dynasty king of Egypt during the First Intermediate Period.
Nikaure	Vizier	4th dynasty	fl. c. 26th century BC	Prince, chief justice and vizier during the 4th dynasty. Nikaure was a son of Pharaoh Khafre and Queen Persenet. His wife was Nikanebti.
Nimaathap	Queen	2nd dynasty	fl. c. 27th century BC	Queen, husband unknown.
Nimaathap II	Queen	5th dynasty	fl. c. 26th century BC	Queen of Egypt at the end of the 2nd dynasty. Wife of Pharaoh Khasekhemwy.
Nimlot	Libyan chief	21st dynasty	fl. c. 10th century BCE	Great Chief of the Ma, known for being the father of pharaoh Shoshenq I and brother of pharaoh Osorkon the Elder.
Nimlot	Prince	22nd dynasty	fl. c. 940 BCE	Prince, son of pharaoh Shoshenq I; he also was a general and a governor at Herakleopolis Magna.
Nimlot	High Priest of Amun	22nd dynasty	fl. c. mid-9th century BC	High Priest of Amun at Thebes during the latter part of the reign of his father, pharaoh Osorkon II.
Nimlot	King of Hermopolis	25th dynasty	fl. c. mid-8th century BCE	Local pharaoh at Hermopolis during the 25th dynasty, he submitted himself to Piye and is depicted on the latter's Victory stela.
Nitocris	Pharaoh / Queen	6th dynasty	fl. c. 22nd century BC	May have been the last pharaoh of the Egyptian 6th Dynasty. However, her historicity has been questioned.
Nitocris I	God's Wife of Amun	26th dynasty	fl. c. mid-7th to early-6th century BC	Also known as Nitiqret, she was the Divine Adoratrice of Amun or God's Wife of Amun for over 70 years. She was the daughter of the Saite pharaoh Psamtik I.
Nitocris II	Princess, High Priest of Amun	26th Dynasty	fl. c. mid-6th century BC	Daughter of pharaoh Amasis II and a female High Priest of Amun.
Nodjmet	Noble	20th-21st dynasty	fl. c. early-11th century BCE	Noblewoman, wife of the High Priest of Amun Herihor and/or Piankh.
Nofret	Princess	4th dynasty	fl. c. 26th century BC	Noblewoman and princess who lived during the 4th dynasty of Egypt. Nofret married Prince Rahotep, who was a son of Pharaoh Sneferu.
Nofret II	Queen	12th dynasty	fl. c. early-19th century BC	Daughter of Amenemhat II and wife of Senusret II.
Nubhetepti-khered	Princess	13th dynasty	fl. c. mid-18th century BC	Egyptian king's daughter during the 13th dynasty. Probably a daughter of King Hor.
Nubkhaes	Queen	13th dynasty	fl. c. mid-17th century BC	13th dynasty Egyptian queen whose husband is assumed to be one of the successors of pharaoh Sobekhotep IV.
Nubkhesbed	Queen	20th dynasty	fl. c. mid-12th century BC	Great Royal Wife of Pharaoh Ramesses VI and mother of Pharaoh Ramesses VII.
Nubwenet	Queen	6th dynasty	fl. c. 24th century BC	Also known as Nebuunet, an Egyptian queen consort and a wife of the 6th dynasty pharaoh Pepi I.
Nuya	Pharaoh	14th dynasty	fl. c. 17th century BC	Poorly known pharaoh of the 14th dynasty, likely of Semitic descent and reigning over the eastern Nile Delta.
Nykara	Granary Official	5th dynasty	fl. c. 25th century BC	Known from a granite statue of Nykara and his family, now at the Brooklyn Museum.
Nynetjer	Pharaoh	2nd dynasty	fl. c. 28th century BC	Long-lived king of the mid 2nd dynasty of Egypt. It is possible that he was a son of his predecessor Raneb.
Nyuserre Ini	Pharaoh	5th dynasty	fl. c. 25th century BC	Also known as Neuserre Izi, Niuserre Isi, Nyuserra, and Rathoris. A 5th dynasty pharaoh of Egypt (reigned c. 2453 BC – c. 2422 BC).

== O ==
Name	Main title	Dynasty	Date	Comment
Osorkon the Elder	Pharaoh	21st dynasty	fl. c. early-10th century BC	Osorkon Akheperre Setepenre reigned c. 992 BC – c. 986 BC, and was the first pharaoh of Libyan extraction to rule Egypt. He was the son of Shoshenq, the Great Chief of the Ma.
Osorkon I	Pharaoh	22nd dynasty	reigned c. 922 BC – c. 887 BC	Son of Sheshonk I and his chief consort, Karomat. Osorkon I's reign was long and prosperous and is known for many temple building projects.
Osorkon II	Pharaoh	22nd dynasty	reigned c. 872 BC – c. 837 BC	Son of Takelot I and Queen Kapes. He ruled Egypt from Tanis. After succeeding his father, he faced a revolt from his cousin, Harsiese, who controlled Thebes. However, Osorkon II was able to unite Egypt after Harsiese's death. Further names include 'Usermaatre Setepenamun.
Osorkon III	Pharaoh	23rd dynasty	reigned c. 798 BC – c. 769 BC	Usermaatre Setepenamun Si-Ese was a pharaoh of Upper Egypt based in Thebes. He was also a High Priest of Amun. He was a son of Takelot II and Queen Karomama II. During his reign, he defeated the rival forces of Sheshonk IV.
Osorkon IV	Pharaoh	22nd dynasty	fl. c. mid-8th century BC	Ruler of Lower Egypt who was based in Tanis and therefore one of the 22nd dynasty pharaoh Shoshenq V's successors.
Osorkon C	Great Chief of the Ma	22nd dynasty	fl. c. mid-8th century BC	Great Chief of the Ma and governor of Sais, predecessor of pharaoh Tefnakht of the 24th Dynasty.

== P ==
Name	Main title	Dynasty	Date	Comment
Paanchi	Pharaoh	25th dynasty		see Piye
Pabasa	Chief Steward	26th dynasty	fl. c. mid-7th century BC	Chief Steward to the Divine Adoratrice of Amun, Nitocris I.
Pageti	Princess	4th dynasty	fl. c. 26th century BC	Daughter of Nefermaat, the eldest son of pharaoh Sneferu and Itet.
Pahemnetjer	High Priest of Ptah	19th dynasty	fl. c. mid-13th century BC	High Priest of Ptah during the reign of Ramesses II. Pahemnetjer succeeded Huy as High Priest of Ptah.
Pami Usermaatre Setepenre	Pharaoh	22nd dynasty	fl. c. mid-8th century BC	Reigned c. 785 BC – c. 778 BC, and was a member of the Meshwesh Libyans then ruling the country.
Panehesy (I)	Chief servitor of the Aten	18th dynasty	fl. c. 14th century BC	High Priest of the Aten in the temple of Aten in Akhetaten during the reign of Akhenaten.
Panehesy (II)	Prophet of Amenhotep (I) of the Forecourt	19th dynasty	fl. c. 13th century BC	Served during the reign of Pharaoh Ramesses II.
Panehesy	Vizier	19th dynasty	fl. c. late-13th century BC	Served during the reign of Pharaoh Merenptah.
Paraemheb	Vizier	19th dynasty	fl. c. late-13th century BC	Vizier of Egypt during the reigns of the pharaohs Amenmesse and Seti II. Also known as Pre'em'hab.
Pareherwenemef	Prince	19th dynasty	fl. c. mid-13th century BC	Son of pharaoh Ramesses II and Queen Nefertari.
Pareherwenemef	Prince	20th dynasty	fl. c. early-12th century BC	Son of pharaoh Ramesses III.
Parennefer called Wennefer	High Priest of Amun	18th dynasty	fl. c. mid to late-14th century BC	High Priest of Amun during the reigns of the 18th dynasty pharaohs Tutankhamen and Horemheb.
Parennefer	Royal Butler	18th dynasty	fl. c. mid-14th century BC	Pharaoh Akhenaten's close adviser both before and after Akhenaten came to the throne.
Pasenhor	Priest	22nd dynasty	fl. c. 730 BCE	Priest of Ptah under pharaoh Shoshenq V, known for his long genealogy written on an Apis burial stela.
Paser I	Viceroy of Kush	18th dynasty	fl. c. 14th century BC	Likely served during the reigns of Ay and Horemheb
Paser	Vizier	19th dynasty	fl. c. early to mid-13th century BC	Vizier during the reigns of pharaohs Seti I and Ramesses II. Later he became a High Priest of Amun.
Paser II	Viceroy of Kush	19th dynasty	fl. c. 13th century BC	Son of the High Priest of Min and Isis named Minmose. He was a King's son of Kush, overseer of the Southern Lands, and king's scribe.
Pashedu	Artisan	19th dynasty	fl. c. 13th century BC	Lived in Deir el-Medina on the west bank of the Nile, opposite Thebes, during the reign of Seti I.
Patareshnes	Queen	22nd dynasty	fl. c. mid-10th century BC	Wife of pharaoh Sheshonk I. Her name is sometimes written as Patoreshnes or Penreshnes.
Paweraa	Mayor of Western Thebes	20th dynasty	fl. c. 11th century BC	Mayor of Western Thebes during a series of tomb robberies that occurred in the Valley of the Kings during the late New Kingdom.
Pawura	Chief of the Archers	18th dynasty	fl. c. 14th century BC	Egyptian official mentioned in the Amarna letters. He is referred to as an Egyptian "archer–commander" and an "irpi–official".
Pebatjma	Nubian Queen		fl. c. 8th century BC	Wife of King Kashta and mother of King Piye (possibly), King Shabaka, God's Wife Amenirdis I, Queens Khensa and Peksater.
Pebekkamen	Chief of the Chamber	20th dynasty	fl. c. early-12th century BC	One of the key conspirators in the Harem conspiracy, a plot to overthrow Pharaoh Ramesses III. Pebekkamen had served as chief of the chamber to Ramesses. Following his trial, Pebekkamen was executed.
Pediamenopet	Priest	25th and 26th dynasty	fl. c. late 8th century BC	Librarian, archivist and Chief Lector Priest during the Egyptian 25th and 26th dynasties who amassed enough wealth to build a labyrinthine tomb covered with frescoes and hieroglyphics.
Pediese	Local Ruler	Third Intermediate Period	fl. c. late 8th century BC	Pediese, married to the great-great-granddaughter of Shoshenq III, was one of a number of princes ruling Lower Egypt. He was of Libyan descent, a chief of the Ma. He ruled from Athribis.
Pediese, chief of the Ma	High Priest of Ptah	Third Intermediate Period	fl. c. late 8th century BC	Involved in the replacement of an Apis bull which had died in the 28th year of the reign of Shoshenq III.
Pehen-Ptah	Chief of sculptors	2nd or 3rd Dynasty	fl. c. 28–27th century BC	Official in charge of the sculptors of the king.
Petiese	Administrator	Persian Occupation, 26th dynasty	fl. c. 7th century BC	Son of Ireturu, administered Upper Egypt. In 651 BCE he had his priestly offices confirmed by Psamtik I.
Pedubast I	Pharaoh	23rd dynasty	fl. c. late-9th century BC	King of Libyan ancestry (reigned c. 829 BC – c. 804 BC) . He was the main opponent to the 23rd dynasty Upper Egyptian pharaohs Takelot II and Osorkon III during a protracted civil war between these two competing sides.
Pedubast II	Pharaoh	22nd dynasty	fl. c. mid-8th century BC	Pharaoh of Lower Egypt (reigned c. 740 BC – c. 730 BC) associated with the 22nd dynasty. He was a possible son and successor to Shoshenq V.
Peftjauawybast	King of Herakleopolis	25th dynasty	fl. c. late-8th century BCE	Local pharaoh at Herakleopolis Magna who submitted himself to the 25th dynasty pharaoh Piye as shown on the latter's Victory stela. Also called Peftjaubast.
Peksater	Queen	25th dynasty	fl. c. mid-8th century BC	Daughter of King Kashta and Queen Pebatjma and a wife of the pharaoh, Piye.
Penebui	Queen	1st dynasty	fl. c. 31st century BC	Wife of King Djer.
Pennesuttawy	General	19th dynasty	fl. c. late-14th century BC	General and superintendent of the Southern Lands (Kush) at the beginning of the 19th dynasty of Egypt. Pennesuttawy was a brother of the High Priest of Amun, Parennefer.
Pensekhmet	Vizier	19th dynasty	fl. c. late-13th century BC	Served during the reign of the 19th dynasty pharaoh Merenptah.
Pentawer(et)	Prince	19th dynasty	fl. c. early-12th century BC	Son of Pharaoh Ramesses III and Queen Tiye. He was to be the beneficiary of a "harem conspiracy" planned by his mother to assassinate the pharaoh. The plot failed and Pentawer was forced to commit suicide.
Penthu	Physician, Chamberlain	18th dynasty	fl. c. mid-14th century BC	Seal-bearer of the king, king's scribe, chief of physicians and chamberlain to the 18th dynasty pharaoh Akhenaten.
Pentu	Vizier	18th dynasty	fl. c. mid-14th century BC	Vizier of Egypt during the reign of pharaoh Tutankhamun. Also written as Pentju.
Pepi I Meryre	Pharaoh	6th dynasty	reigned c. 2332 BC – c. 2283 BC	Pepi I's long reign was marked by an aggressive expansion into Nubia and the spread of trade to far-flung areas such as Lebanon and the Somali coast, but also the growing power of the nomarchs.
Pepi II Neferkare	Pharaoh	6th dynasty	reigned c. 2278 BC – c. 2184 BC	Son of Merenre and Ankhesenpepi II. His lengthy reign was marked by a sharp decline of the Old Kingdom as the power of the nomarchs grew.
Pepi III Neferirkare	Pharaoh	8th dynasty		Obscure ruler of the first intermediate period.
Pepi IV Seneferankhre	Pharaoh	16th dynasty		Obscure ruler of the second intermediate period, possibly a vassal of the Hyksos kings or a king of the 16th dynasty
Perneb	Prince	2nd dynasty	fl. c. 28th century BC	Son of the 2nd dynasty pharaoh Hotepsekhemwy.
Persenet	Queen	4th dynasty	fl. c. 26th century BC	May have been a daughter of King Khufu and a wife of King Khafre.
Peseshet	Physician	4th dynasty	fl. c. 26th century BC	Her title was "lady overseer of the female physicians,"but whether she was a physician herself is uncertain. She had a son, Akhethetep, in whose mastaba at Giza her personal stela was found.
Petubastis III	Pharaoh	Persian Occupation	fl. late 6th century BC	Egyptian ruler who revolted against Persian rule under the satrap Aryandes. He was probably a member of the old royal Saitic line, who attempted to seize power around 522 BC. Aryandes probably quelled the rebellion.(or Seheruibre Padibastet)
Piankh	High Priest of Amun	21st dynasty	fl. c. mid-11th century BC	High Priest of Amun who led an army against Pinehesy, viceroy of Kush, who had conquered large parts of Upper Egypt and succeeded in driving him back into Nubia.
Pihuri	Commissioner	18th dynasty	fl. c. mid-14th century BC	Egyptian commissioner in the "Land of Retenu" (Canaan) mentioned in the Amarna letters. He probably served under pharaohs Amenhotep III and Akhenaten. His name is sometimes written as Pakhura.
Pimay	Prince	22nd dynasty	fl. c. late-9th century BC	Son of king Sheshonk III. He served as a 'Great Chief of the Ma' during his father's reign.
Pinedjem I	High Priest of Amun	21st dynasty	fl. c. mid-11th century BC	High Priest of Amun at Thebes in Egypt and the de facto ruler of Middle and Upper Egypt from 1054 BC. He asserted his virtual independence from the 21st dynasty based at Tanis. He married Duathathor-Henuttawy, a daughter of Ramesses XI.
Pinedjem II	High Priest of Amun	21st dynasty	fl. c. early-10th century BC	High Priest of Amun at Thebes in Egypt and the de facto ruler of the south of the country. He married his sister Isetemkheb and his niece Nesikhons, the daughter of his brother Smendes II.
Pinehesy	Viceroy of Kush	20th dynasty	fl. c. early-11th century BC	Served during the reign of pharaoh Ramesses XI. Pinehesy extended his influence over much of the south of Egypt defying Ramesses XI. However, the High Priest of Amun, Herihor, was able to drive Pinehesy back into Nubia. Also known as Panehesy or Panehasy.
Pipi	High Priest of Ptah	21st dynasty	fl. c. mid-11th century BC	High Priest of Ptah, a contemporary of Pharaoh Psusennes I. He was the father of the High Priest of Ptah Harsiese.
Piye (or Piankhi the Nubian)	Pharaoh	25th dynasty	reigned c. 752 BC – c. 721 BC	Kushite king and founder of the 25th dynasty of Egypt who ruled from the city of Napata. As ruler of Nubia and Upper Egypt, Piye took advantage of the squabbling of Egypt's rulers to expand Nubia's power beyond Thebes into Lower Egypt receiving the submission of the kings of the Nile Delta.
Potasimto	General	26th dynasty	fl. c. early-6th century BC	Commander of the Greek troops during an expedition against Nubia under pharaoh Psamtik II; his real Egyptian name was Padismatawy.
Pothinus	Regent	Ptolemaic	fl. mid-1st century BC	Official under Pharaoh Ptolemy XII. When Ptolemy XII died in 51 BC, as his son Ptolemy XIII was under age, Pothinus was appointed as his regent. Pothinus used his influence to turn Ptolemy XIII against Cleopatra VII. In the resultant civil war, Cleopatra VII and Julius Caesar prevailed and Pothinus was executed in 47 BC.
Prehotep I	Vizier	19th dynasty	fl. c. mid-13th century BC	Vizier during the latter part of the reign of pharaoh Ramesses II. Also known as Rahotep, Parahotep, Parehotp.
Prehotep II	Vizier	19th dynasty	fl. c. mid-13th century BC	Vizier during the latter part of the reign of pharaoh Ramesses II. Parahotep was the son of the High Priest of Ptah Pahemnetjer. Also known as Rahotep, Parahotep, Parehotp.
Psammetichus IV	Rebel ruler	27th dynasty	fl. 5th century BC	Egyptian ruler who rebelled to the Persian occupation.
Psammuthes	Pharaoh	29th dynasty	fl. c. early-4th century BC	Upon the death of Nepherites I, two rival factions fought for the throne: one supported Muthis son of Nefaarud, and the other supported an usurper named Psammuthes. Both men were eventually defeated by a general named Hakor.
Psamtik I Wahibre	Pharaoh	26th dynasty	reigned c. 664 BC – c. 610 BC	Managed to unite all of Egypt and free the country from Assyrian and Nubian control within the first ten years of his reign. (or Psammeticus or Psammetichus)
Psamtik II	Pharaoh	26th dynasty	reigned c. 595 BC – c. 589 BC	In 592 BC, Psamtik II marched deep into Nubia and inflicted a heavy defeat on the kingdom of Kush.(or Psammetichus or Psammeticus)
Psamtik III	Pharaoh	26th dynasty	reigned c. 526 BC – c. 525 BC	Last pharaoh of the 26th dynasty of Egypt. Psamtik had ruled Egypt for only six months before the Persian invasion led by King Cambyses II. Psamtik was defeated at Pelusium and later executed by the Persians.(or Psammetichus or Psammeticus)
Psusennes I	Pharaoh	21st dynasty	reigned c. 1047 BC – c. 1001 BC	Son of Pinedjem I and Henuttawy, a daughter of Ramesses XI. He married his sister Mutnedjmet.(or Psibkhanno or Hor-Pasebakhaenniut I)
Psusennes II Titkheperure	Pharaoh	21st dynasty	reigned c. 967 BC – c. 943 BC	Last king of the 21st dynasty of Egypt. He was a High Priest of Amun at Thebes and the son of Pinedjem II and Istemkheb.(or Tyetkheperre Psusennes II or Hor-Pasebakhaenniut II)
Psusennes III	High Priest of Amun	21st dynasty	fl. c. mid-10th century BC	High Priest of Amun at Thebes towards the end of the 21st Dynasty of Egypt.
Ptahhotep	Vizier	5th dynasty	fl. c. 24th century BC	City administrator and vizier during the reign of Djedkare Isesi. He is credited with authoring "The Instruction of Ptahhotep", which was meant to instruct young men in appropriate behaviour.
Ptahmose	High Priest of Ptah	18th dynasty	fl. c. late-15th century BC	Served under pharaohs Thutmose IV and Amenhotep III. Ptahmose also held the titles of count and governor, and Sem-priest.
Ptahmose	Treasurer	18th dynasty	fl. c. 14th century BC	Treasurer under the 18th dynasty pharaoh Amenhotep III and known from a statue.
Ptahmose	Vizier	18th dynasty	fl. c. early-14th century BC	High Priest of Amun and vizier of southern Egypt under the 18th dynasty pharaoh Amenhotep III.
Ptahshepses	Vizier	5th dynasty	fl. c. 25th century BC	Vizier and son-in-law of king Niuserre. His mastaba complex in Abusir is considered by many to be the most extensive and architecturally unique non-royal tomb of the Old Kingdom.
Puimre	Second prophet of Amun	18th dynasty	fl. c. early-14th century BC	Served during the reigns of Thutmose III and Hatshepsut.
Pyhia	Princess	18th dynasty	fl. c. early-14th century BC	Egyptian princess, a daughter of Thutmose IV. Her name is sometimes written as Pyihia or Petepihu.

== Q ==
Name	Main title	Dynasty	Date	Comment
Qa'a	Pharaoh	1st dynasty	fl. c. 29th century BC	Last king of the 1st dynasty of Egypt.
Qakare Ibi	Pharaoh	8th dynasty	fl. c. 22nd century BC	Reigned c. 2169 BC – c. 2167 BC, during the First Intermediate Period.
Qakare Ini	Pharaoh	11th-12th dynasty	fl. early-20th century BCE	Egyptian or Nubian pretender to the throne, he was an opponent of Amenemhat I but was defeated by him.
Qalhata	Queen	25th dynasty	fl. c. late-8th century BC	Daughter of King Piye and a queen consort to her brother Shabaka.
Qar	Royal physician and priest	6th dynasty	2332–2283 BC	Physician and priest of the mortuary cults of Khafre and Menkaure under Pepi I
Qareh	Pharaoh	14th or 16th dynasty		Either a pharaoh of Canaanite descent reigning over the eastern Nile Delta in the early 14th Dynasty or a vassal of the Hyksos kings.
Qen	Artisan	19th dynasty	fl. c. 13th century BC	Lived in Deir el-Medina during the reign of Ramesses II. His titles included Servant in the Place of Truth, meaning that he work on the excavation and decoration of nearby royal tombs.
Qenna	Merchant			Known from the Papyrus of Qenna, a part of the Book of the Dead.

== R ==
Name	Main title	Dynasty	Date	Comment
Raemka	Prince	5th dynasty	fl. c. 24th century BC	Possibly a son of Pharaoh Menkauhor Kaiu. Raemka was buried in Saqqara.
Raherka	Chief of Scribes	4th - 5th dynasty	fl. c. 24th century BC	Official known mainly from the pair statue with his wife: The statue of Raherka and Meresankh
Rahotep	Pharaoh	17th dynasty	fl. c. early-16th century BC	Also known as Sekhenrewahkhaw Rahotep. He reigned during the Second Intermediate Period, when Egypt was ruled by a number of kings at the same time.
Rahotep	Prince	4th dynasty	fl. c. 26th century BC	Probably a son of pharaoh Sneferu and his first wife, although his father could have been Huni. Statues of Rahotep and his wife Nofret were found in his mastaba in Meidum.
Ramesses I Menpehtyre	Pharaoh	19th dynasty	fl. c. late-14th to early 13th century BC	Founding pharaoh of Egypt's 19th dynasty (reigned c. 1292 BC – c. 1290 BC). Originally called Paramessu, Ramesses I was born into a noble military family from the Nile delta region. Horemheb, the last pharaoh of the 18th dynasty, appointed him as his Vizier, and later, as his heir.
Ramesses II the Great	Pharaoh	19th dynasty	reigned c. 1279 BC – c. 1213 BC	Regarded as Ancient Egypt's greatest and most powerful pharaoh. Ramesses II led successful expeditions north into Canaan, Lebanon and Syria and south into Nubia. He focused on building cities, temples and monuments and established the city of Pi-Ramesses in the Nile Delta as his new capital.
Ramesses III Usimare	Pharaoh	20th dynasty	reigned c. 1186 BC – c. 1155 BC	Last great New Kingdom king to wield any substantial authority over Egypt. He was the son of Setnakhte and Queen Tiy-Merenese. During his long reign, Egypt was beset by foreign invaders (including the “Sea Peoples” and the Libyans).
Ramesses IV Heqamaatre	Pharaoh	20th dynasty	fl. c. mid-12th century BC	Reigned c. 1155 BC – c. 1149 BC. A son of Ramesses III, he initiated a substantial building program including an enlargement of the Temple of Khonsu at Karnak. Also known as Amonhirkhopshef.
Ramesses V Usermare Sekhepenre	Pharaoh	20th dynasty	fl. c. mid-12th century BC	Son of Ramesses IV and Queen Duatentopet. During his reign the power of the priesthood of Amun continued to grow, controlling the state's finances and much of the temple land in the country at the expense of the pharaohs.
Ramesses VI	Pharaoh	20th dynasty	fl. c. mid-12th century BC	Son of Ramesses III and Iset Ta-Hemdjert. Egypt's political and economic decline continued during his reign. At Thebes, the power of the chief priests of Amun continued to grow at the expense of the pharaohs.
Ramesses VII Usermaatre Meryamun Setepenre	Pharaoh	20th dynasty	fl. c. mid-12th century BC	Son of Ramesses VI.
Ramesses VIII Usermare Akhenamun	Pharaoh	20th dynasty	fl. c. mid-12th century BC	One of the last surviving sons of Ramesses III. Also known as Ramesses Sethherkhepshef Meryamun.
Ramesses IX	Pharaoh	20th dynasty	fl. c. late-12th century BC	Son of Montuherkhopshef and grandson of Ramesses III. He reigned c. 1129 BC – c. 1111 BC.
Ramesses X Khepermare	Pharaoh	20th dynasty	fl. c. late-12th century BC	Pharaoh of the 20th dynasty of Egypt (reigned c. 1111 BC – c. 1107 BC). He was possibly a son of Ramesses IX and husband of Queen Tyti, but this is unproven.
Ramesses XI	Pharaoh	20th dynasty	reigned c. 1107 BC – c. 1078 BC	Last king of the 20th dynasty of Egypt. He was probably the son of Ramesses X and Queen Tyti. Ramesses XI's reign saw the continuing disintegration of the Egyptian state. By late in his reign, he was forced to share power with the High Priest of Amun, Herihor, who controlled Thebes and Upper Egypt, and Smendes, who as governor, controlled Lower Egypt.
Ramesses	Prince	19th dynasty	fl. c. mid-13th century BC	Eldest son of Pharaoh Ramesses II and Queen Isetnofret. He was the heir to the Egyptian throne but pre-deceased his father.
Ramesses-Meryamun-Nebweben	Prince	19th dynasty	fl. c. mid-13th century BC	Son of pharaoh Ramesses II.
Ramessesnakht	High Priest of Amun	20th dynasty	fl. c. mid-12th century BC	Appointed as the High Priest of Amun at Thebes under pharaoh Ramesses IV. He held this office until the reign of Ramesses IX. It was during Ramessesnakht's tenure that the power and importance of the Amun priesthood grew while the pharaoh's power began to noticeably decline.
Ramose	Prince	18th dynasty	fl. c. late-16th century BC	Probably the son of Pharaoh Ahmose I.
Ramose	Vizier	18th dynasty	fl. c. mid-14th century BC	Nobleman, Governor of Thebes and vizier under pharaohs Amenhotep III and Akhenaten.
Raneb	Pharaoh	2nd dynasty	fl. c. late-29th to early-28th century BC	King during the 2nd dynasty of Egypt.
Ranefer	Prince	4th dynasty	fl. c. 26th century BC	Son of pharaoh Sneferu, the first ruler of the 4th dynasty of Egypt.
Rashepses	Vizier	5th dynasty	fl. c. 24th century BC	Rashepses served under pharaoh Djedkare Isesi.
Rawer	Prince	4th dynasty	fl. c. 24th century BC	Great-grandson of Khufu, brother of Minkhaf II.
Rehuerdjersen	Treasurer	12th dynasty	fl. c. 20th century BC	Treasurer who held this office under pharaoh Amenemhet I.
Rekhetre	Queen	4th/ 5th dynasty	fl. c. 26th century BC	Egyptian queen from the late 4th dynasty or early 5th dynasty. She was a daughter of Pharaoh Khafre. Rekhetre was possibly the wife of one of Khafre's successors as pharaoh.
Rekhmire	Vizier	18th dynasty	fl. c. mid-15th century BC	Nobleman and official, who served as Governor of Thebes and vizier during the reigns of Tuthmosis III and Amenhotep II. He was also High Priest of Annu or Heliopolis.
Renseneb	Pharaoh	13th dynasty	fl. c. mid-18th century BC	Egyptian king of the 13th dynasty. Alternate spelling: Ranisonb.
Reptynub	Queen	5th dynasty	fl. c. 25th century BC	Wife of King Nyuserre Ini. Her name is also written as Repytnub and Reputnebu.
Reputnebty	Princess	5th dynasty	fl. c. 25th century BC	Daughter of pharaoh Nyuserre Ini and possibly queen Reptynub.
Roma-Roi	High Priest of Amun	19th dynasty	fl. c. mid to late-13th century BC	High Priest of Amun towards the end of the reign of Ramesses II and into the reigns of Merenptah and possibly Seti II.
Rudamun Usermaatre Setepenamun Meryamun	Pharaoh	23rd dynasty	reigned c. 759 BC – c. 739 BC	Last pharaoh of the 23rd dynasty based in Upper Egypt. He was the younger son of Osorkon III, and the brother of Takelot III.

== S ==
Name	Main title	Dynasty	Date	Comment
Sabef	Official	1st dynasty	fl. c. 29th century BC	Ancient Egyptian official under king Qa'a in the 1st dynasty.
Sabni	Official	6th dynasty	fl. c. 23rd century BC	Ancient Egyptian expedition under king Pepy II buried at Qubbet el-Hawa.
Sabu called Ibebi	High Priest of Ptah	5th and 6th dynasty	fl. c. 24th century BC	High Priest of Ptah during the reigns king Unas and king Teti.
Sabu called Thety	High Priest of Ptah	6th dynasty	fl. c. 24th century BC	High Priest of Ptah during the reign of king Teti. He was the successor of Sabu Ibebi and probably his son.
Sahure	Pharaoh	5th dynasty	fl. c. 25th century BC	Son of queen Neferhetepes and his father was probably Userkaf. Sahure established a navy and sent the fleet to Punt. He traded with states and cities in the eastern Mediterranean.
Sakir-Har	Pharaoh	15th dynasty	fl. c. late-17th century BC	King of the Hyksos 15th dynasty of Egypt.
Salitis	Pharaoh	15th dynasty	fl. c. late-17th century BC	According to Manetho, the first pharaoh of the Hyksos 15th dynasty of Egypt. The Hyksos founded the city of Avaris which became their capital.
Sanakht	Pharaoh	3rd dynasty	fl. c. 27th century BC	Reigned c. 2686 BC – c. 2668 BC, and was probably the first pharaoh of the 3rd dynasty of Egypt. Referred to as Sanakhte or Nebka.
Sankhenre Sewadjtu	Pharaoh	13th dynasty	fl. c. mid-17th century BC	King of Egypt's 13th dynasty at a time when the kings’ control over all of Egypt was receding.
Satiah	Queen	18th dynasty	fl. c. early-15th century BC	Egyptian queen, the Great Royal Wife of Thutmose III. Also referred to as Sitiah or Sitioh.
Satkhnum	Princess	2nd dynasty	fl. c. 28th century BC	Daughter of an unknown king of the 2nd dynasty; known for stela from her tomb at Helwan.
Scota	princess	in Irish mythology, Scottish mythology, and pseudohistory,	fl. c. 10th century BC	Legendary Egyptian princess. Also referred to as Scotia .
Sebkay	Pharaoh	13th dynasty	fl. c. early-18th century BCE	Pharaoh of the early 13th dynasty, known from a magic wand.
Sedjefakare Amenemhat	Pharaoh	13th dynasty	fl. c. mid-18th century BC	Egyptian king of the 13th dynasty.
Segerseni	Pharaoh	11th-12th dynasty	fl. early-20th century BCE	Egyptian or Nubian pretender to the throne, he was an opponent of Amenemhat I but was defeated by him.
Sehebre	Pharaoh	14th dynasty	c. 1700 BC	Pharaoh of the 14th dynasty, probably of Canaanite descent and reigning over the eastern Nile Delta during the second intermediate period.
Sehener	Princess	2nd Dynasty	fl. c. 28th century BC	Daughter of an unknown king of the 2nd dynasty; attested by a slab stela from her tomb at Saqqara.
Seheqenre Sankhptahi	Pharaoh	13th dynasty	fl. c. mid-17th century BC	Among the last pharaohs of the 13th dynasty, shortly before its collapse under the Hyksos.
Sehetepre	Pharaoh	13th dynasty	fl. c. mid-18th century BC	Egyptian king of the 13th dynasty.
Sekhemib-Perenmaat	Pharaoh	2nd dynasty	fl. c. 28th century BC	King during the Egyptian 2nd dynasty, who may have been the same individual as Peribsen, or, more likely, was a separate king who ruled Lower Egypt at the same time that Peribsen ruled Upper Egypt.
Sekhemkare	Vizier	5th dynasty	fl. c. 25th century BC	Vizier during the reigns of kings Userkaf and Sahure. He was a son of king Khafre and queen Hekenuhedjet.
Sekhemkare	Pharaoh	13th dynasty		see Amenemhat V Sekhemkare
Sekhemkhet	Pharaoh	3rd dynasty	fl. c. 27th century BC	Pharaoh in Egypt during the 3rd dynasty.
Sekhemre Khutawy Sobekhotep I	Pharaoh	13th dynasty	fl. c. early-18th century BC	Egyptian king of the 13th Dynasty
Sekheperenre	Pharaoh	14th dynasty	fl. c. early-15th century BC	Pharaoh of the 14th dynasty, probably of Canaanite descent, reigning over the eastern Delta during the mid second intermediate period.
Sekhmakh	Queen		fl. c. mid-4th century BC	Wife of the Nubian king Nastasen.
Semat	Queen	1st dynasty	fl. c. 30th century BC	Possibly a wife of the 1st dynasty king Den.
Sematawytefnakht	Official	30th to Argead dynasty	fl. c. 330s BC	Witnessed the conquest of Egypt by the hands of Alexander the Great.
Semenkare	Pharaoh	13th dynasty	fl. c. mid-18th century BC	Egyptian king of the 13th Dynasty.
Semenre	Pharaoh	16th dynasty	fl. c. early 16th century BC	16th dynasty Theban king during the Second Intermediate Period of Egypt who succeeded Nebiriau II.
Semerkhet	Pharaoh	1st dynasty	fl. c. 30th century BC	King during Egypt's 1st dynasty.
Semqen	Pharaoh	15th or 16th dynasty	fl. c. mid 17th century BC	Early Hyksos ruler.
Senakhtenre Ahmose	Pharaoh	17th dynasty	fl. c. mid-16th century BC	Pharaoh of the late 17th dynasty, his existence and complete name were confirmed by recent archeological discoveries.
Seneb	Overseer of Dwarfs	4th dynasty	fl. c. 26th century BC	Dwarf who served as a high-ranking court official in the Old Kingdom.
Senebhenaf	Vizier	13th dynasty	fl. c. late-17th century BC	Vizier during the 13th dynasty of the Second Intermediate Period.
Senebi	Treasurer	13th dynasty	fl. c. mid-18th to early-17th century BC	Treasurer under the 13th dynasty Egyptian kings Neferhotep I and Sobekhotep IV.
Senebkay	Pharaoh	16th or Abydos dynasty	fl. c. mid-16th century BC	Obscur pharaoh whose tomb discovered in 2014 in Abydos might vindicate the existence of the Abydos Dynasty during the mid second intermediate period.
Senedj	Pharaoh	2nd dynasty	fl. c. 28th century BC	King during the 2nd dynasty of Egypt who resided at Memphis.
Senedjemib Inti	Vizier	5th dynasty	fl. c. 24th century BC	Vizier, who served king Djedkare Isesi.
Senedjemib Mehi	Vizier	6th dynasty	fl. c. 24th century BC	Vizier who started out his career under king Djedkare Isesi and eventually became vizier under king Unas.
Senenmut	Architect, Steward	18th dynasty	fl. c. early-15th century BC	Architect and government official. Senenmut entered royal service during the reign of Thutmose I or Thutmose II. After Hatshepsut became pharaoh, Senenmut became high steward.
Senewosret-Ankh	Vizier	12th – 13th dynasty	fl. c. 18th century BC	Known from a number of sources making it possible to reconstruct his career.
Senkamanisken	King of Kush		fl. c. mid-7th century BC	Nubian king based at Napata (reigned c. 640 BC – c. 620 BC). He was married to Queen Nasalsa who bore him two sons: Anlamani and Aspelta.
Sennedjem	Artisan	19th dynasty	fl. c. early-13th century BC	Egyptian artisan who lived in Deir el-Medina near Thebes during the reigns of the 19th dynasty pharaohs Seti I and Ramesses II. He worked on the excavation and decoration of the nearby royal tombs.
Sennefer	Mayor of Thebes	18th dynasty	fl. c. late-15th century BC	Mayor of Thebes and "Overseer of the Granaries and Fields, Gardens and Cattle of Amun" during the reign of Amenhotep II. He was a son of Ahmose Humay, brother to Amenhotep II's vizier Amenemopet.
Sennefer	Overseer of the Seal	18th dynasty	fl. c. early to mid-15th century BC	Long serving Egyptian official under pharaohs Thutmose II, Hatshepsut, and Thutmose III. His titles included "Overseer of the Seal" and "Overseer of the Gold-land of Amun".
Senneferi	Overseer of the Seal	18th dynasty	fl. c. mid-15th century BC	Overseer of the Seal and "Overseer of the Gold-Land of Amun", during the reign of Thutmose III of the Egyptian 18th dynasty.
Senseneb	Queen-Mother	18th dynasty	fl. c. late 16th century BC	Mother of pharaoh Thutmose I.
Senusret	Vizier	12th dynasty	fl. c. late-20th century BC	Egyptian official who was a vizier during the last years of king Senusret I's rule and in the first years of king Amenemhet II.
Senusret I	Pharaoh	12th dynasty	reigned c. 1971 BC – c. 1926 BC	Son of Amenemhat I and Neferitatjenen. He continued his father's aggressive expansionist policies against Nubia. Senusret I established diplomatic relations with rulers in Syria and Canaan. He also tried to centralize the country's political structure by supporting nomarchs who were loyal to him. Also referred to as Sesostris I and Senwosret I.
Senusret II	Pharaoh	12th dynasty	reigned c. 1897 BC – c. 1878 BC	Son of Amenemhat II. His pyramid was constructed at El-Lahun. Senusret II was interested in the Faiyum oasis region and began work on an extensive irrigation system. Senusret II maintained good relations with the various nomarchs of Egypt. Also referred to as Sesostris II and Senwosret II.
Senusret III	Pharaoh	12th dynasty	reigned c. 1878 BC – c. 1860 BC	Son of Senusret II and Khnemetneferhedjet I. He built the Sesostris Canal and expanded Egyptian control deep into Nubia. His military campaigns gave rise to an era of peace and economic prosperity and he reduced the power of the nomarchs. Also referred to as Sesostris III and Senwosret III.
Senusret IV	Pharaoh	13th, 16th or 17th dynasty	fl. c. late-17th to early-16th century BC	Pharaoh of some parts of Upper Egypt during the second intermediate period when the Hyksos controlled Lower Egypt.
Seqenenre Tao	Pharaoh	17th dynasty	fl. c. 16th century BC	Probably was the son and successor to Senakhtenre Ahmose and Queen Tetisheri.
Serethor	Queen	1st dynasty	fl. c. 30th century BC	Likely a wife of king Den.
Serfka	Prince	4th dynasty	fl. c. 26th century BC	Son of Nefermaat, the eldest son of pharaoh Sneferu, and Itet.
Seshemetka	Queen	1st dynasty	fl. c. 30th century BC	Possibly a wife of king Den and the mother of Anedjib.
Sesheshet	Queen-Mother	6th dynasty	fl. c. 24th century BC	Mother of pharaoh Teti. She was instrumental in enabling her son to gain the throne and reconciling two warring factions of the royal family. Also known as Shesh.
Setau	Viceroy of Kush	19th dynasty	fl. c. 13th century BC	Viceroy of Kush in the second half of Ramesses II's reign.
Setepenre	Princess	18th dynasty	fl. c. mid-14th century BC	Daughter of Pharaoh Akhenaten and queen Nefertiti.
Seth Meribre	Pharaoh	13th dynasty	fl. c. mid-18th century BC	Poorly known king of the 13th dynasty reigning in the early second intermediate period.
Seth-Peribsen	Pharaoh	2nd dynasty	fl. c. 28th century BC	King during the 2nd dynasty of Egypt.
Seti	Commander	18th dynasty	fl. c. late-14th century BC	Egyptian soldier during the late 18th dynasty, the commander of the army and later vizier. He was the father of Pharaoh Ramesses I. Also known as Suti.
Seti	Viceroy of Kush	19th dynasty	fl. c. 13th century BC	Viceroy of Kush Seti is attested in year 1 of Siptah. Seti is also mentioned on some monuments of his son Amenemhab. Amenemhab was the son of Seti and the Lady Amenemtaiauw. Seti held the titles fan-bearer on the king's right, king's scribe of the letters of the Pharaoh.
Seti I Menmaatre	Pharaoh	19th dynasty	reigned c. 1290 BC – c. 1279 BC	Son of Ramesses I and Queen Sitre, and the father of Ramesses II. He reconquered most of the territories in Canaan and Syria disputed with the Hittites. Seti I also fought a series of wars in Libya and Nubia. Also referred to as Sethos I.
Seti II Userkheperure Setepenre	Pharaoh	19th dynasty	reigned c. 1203 BC – c. 1197 BC	Son of Merneptah and queen Isetnofret II. Seti II had to deal with the accession of a rival named Amenmesse who seized control over Thebes and Nubia in Upper Egypt. Also referred to as Sethos II.
Seti-Merenptah	Pharaoh	19th dynasty	fl. c. early-12th century BC	Egyptian prince of the late 19th dynasty, a son of Pharaoh Seti II and Isetnofret II.
Setnakhte Userkhaure-Setepenre	Pharaoh	20th dynasty	fl. c. early-12th century BC	First pharaoh of the 20th dynasty of Egypt (reigned c. 1190 BC – c. 1186 BC) and the father of Ramesses III. He was either an usurper who seized the throne or a member of a minor line of the royal family who emerged as pharaoh.
Setut	Pharaoh	9th dynasty	fl. c. 22nd century BCE	Pharaoh of the Herakleopolite 9th dynasty, also called Senen ... .
Seuserenre Bebiankh	Pharaoh	16th dynasty		see Bebiankh
Sewadjkare	Pharaoh	13th dynasty	fl. c. mid-17th century BC	Pharaoh of the 13th dynasty of Egypt.
Sewadjkare Hori	Pharaoh	13th dynasty	fl. c. mid-17th century BC	Pharaoh of the 13th dynasty of Egypt.
Sewadjkare III	Pharaoh	14th dynasty	c. 1699 BC	Pharaoh of the 14th dynasty, probably of Canaanite descent and reigning over the eastern Nile Delta during the second intermediate period.
Shabaka Neferkare	Pharaoh	25th dynasty	reigned c. 721 BC – c. 707 BC	Thought to be the son of King Kashta and Pebatjma, although a text from the time of Taharqa could be interpreted to mean that Shabaka was a brother of Taharqa and hence a son of Piye. He consolidated the Nubia's control over Egypt from Nubia to the Delta region. Shabaka maintained Egypt's independence from the Assyrian empire under Sargon II.
Sharek	Pharaoh	-	reigned during the Second Intermediate Period	Possibly the same person of the Manethonian Salitis, founder of the 15th Dynasty.
Shebitku	Pharaoh	25th dynasty	reigned c. 707 BC – c. 690 BC	Nephew and successor of Shabaka and a son of Piye, the founder of the dynasty. Shebitku actively resisted Assyrian expansion under Sennacherib into Canaan.
Shedsu-nefertum	High Priest of Ptah	21st – 22nd dynasty	fl. c. late-10th century BC	Son of the High Priest Ankhefensekhmet and the lady Tapeshenese, who was First Chief of the Harem of Ptah and Prophetess of Mut.
Shemay	Vizier of Upper Egypt	8th dynasty	fl. c. early-22nd century BC	Nomarch of Coptos and vizier of Upper Egypt in the early First Intermediate Period. The beneficiary of most of the Coptos Decrees, his career is symptomatic of the decline of kingship at the end of the Old Kingdom.
Sheneh	Pharaoh	14th or 16th dynasty	fl. c. 17th century BC	Semitic ruler of Lower Egypt belonging to the 14th dynasty or vassal of the Hyksos and belonging to the 16th dynasty during the second intermediate period.
Shenshek	Pharaoh	14th or 16th dynasty	fl. c. 17th century BC	Semitic ruler of Lower Egypt belonging to the 14th dynasty or vassal of the Hyksos and belonging to the 16th dynasty during the second intermediate period.
Shepenupet I	Divine Adoratrice of Amun	25th dynasty	fl. c. mid-8th century BC	First Divine Adoratrice of Amun to wield political power in Thebes. She was a daughter of Osorkon III and Queen Karoadjet. Also called Shepenwpet I.
Shepenupet II	Divine Adoratrice of Amun	25th dynasty	fl. c. early-7th century BC	Daughter of the first Kushite pharaoh Piye and sister of Piye's successors Taharqa and Shabaka. Also called Shepenwpet II.
Shepseska	Prince	5th dynasty	fl. c. 26th century BC	Son of Nefermaat, the eldest son of pharaoh Sneferu, and Itet.
Shepseskaf	Pharaoh	4th dynasty	fl. c. 26th century BC	Possibly a son of the Egyptian king Menkaure who succeeded his father on the throne (reigned c. 2503 BC – c. 2498 BC). He was probably the last king of the 4th dynasty.
Shepseskare Isi	Pharaoh	5th dynasty	fl. c. 25th century BC	Reigned c. 2467 BC – c. 2460 BC. Sometime referred to as Shepseskare, Sisiris.
Shepsesneb	Prince	4th dynasty	fl. c. 26th century BC	Son of Nefermaat, the eldest son of pharaoh Sneferu and Itet.
Shepset-ipet	Princess	2nd dynasty	fl. c. late 27th century BC	Daughter of a king of the late 2nd Dynasty, possibly Khasekhemwy or Peribsen.
Shery	Official	4th dynasty	fl. c. 28th century BC	Egyptian official who probably lived during the 4th Dynasty. He was Great of the Ten of Upper Egypt and Chief of the wab-priest of Peribsen in the necropolis of Senedj.
Sheshi Maaibre	Pharaoh	14th dynasty	fl. c. early-17th century BC	14th dynasty pharaoh of Egypt during the Second Intermediate Period.
Shoshenq I Hedjkheperre Setepenre	Pharaoh	22nd dynasty	reigned c. 943 BC – c. 922 BC	Meshwesh (Libyan) Berber king of Egypt and the founder of the 22nd Dynasty. He was the son of Nimlot, Great Chief of the Ma, and his wife Tentshepeh. Sheshonk I pursued an aggressive foreign policy against Syria, Philistine, Phoenicia, Judah and Israel. Also known as Shoshenq I, Sheshonk, Sheshonq I.
Sheshonk II Heqakheperre	Pharaoh	22nd dynasty	reigned c. 887 BC – c. 885 BC	King of the 22nd dynasty of Egypt.
Shoshenq III Usermaatre Setepenre	Pharaoh	22nd dynasty	reigned c. 837 BC – c. 798 BC	His reign was marked by the loss of Egypt's political unity, with the appearance of Pedubast I at Thebes. Henceforth, the 22nd Dynasty kings only controlled Lower Egypt.
Shoshenq IV Hedjkheperre Setepenre	Pharaoh	22nd dynasty	reigned c. 798 BC – c. 785 BC	King during Egypt's 22nd dynasty. Also referred to as Shoshenq IV.
Shoshenq V	Pharaoh	22nd dynasty	reigned c. 778 BC – c. 740 BC	Final king of the 22nd dynasty of Egypt of Meshwesh Libyans which controlled Lower Egypt. With his death, the kingdom in the Egyptian Delta disintegrated into various city states.
Shoshenq VI	Pharaoh	23rd dynasty	fl. c. late-9th century BC	23rd Dynasty king based at Thebes (reigned c. 804 BC – c. 798 BC). He was defeated and ousted from power by Prince Osorkon (later Osorkon III).
Shoshenq	Libyan chief	21st dynasty	fl. c. 11th-10th century BCE	Great chief of the Ma during the 21st dynasty, father of pharaoh Osorkon the Elder and grandfather of pharaoh Shoshenq I.
Shoshenq	High Priest of Amun	22nd dynasty	fl. c. late-10th century BC	Eldest son of pharaoh Osorkon I and queen Maatkare, the daughter of Psusennes II, and served as the High Priest of Amun at Thebes during his father's reign.
Shoshenq	High Priest of Ptah	22nd dynasty	fl. c. mid-9th century BC	Eldest son of Osorkon II and Queen Karomama.
Siamun Netjerkheperre-Setepenamun	Pharaoh	21st dynasty	reigned c. 986 BC – c. 967 BC	Doubled the size of the Temple of Amun at Tanis and initiated works at the Temple of Horus at Mesen. He embarked upon an active foreign policy.
Siamun	Prince	18th dynasty	fl. c. late-16th century BC	Son of Pharaoh Ahmose I and Queen Ahmose Nefertari.
Siamun	Prince	18th dynasty	fl. c. mid-15th century BC	Son of Pharaoh Thutmose III.
Siaspiqa	King of Meroe		fl. c. early-5th century BC	Kushite King of Meroe (reigned c. 487 BC – c. 468 BC).
Siatum	Prince	18th dynasty	fl. c. early-14th century BC	Probably one of the sons of Pharaoh Thutmose IV and thus the brother or half-brother of Amenhotep III.
Siese	Vizier	12th dynasty	fl. c. 20th century BC	Egyptian vizier and treasurer during the 12th dynasty. He was probably vizier under pharaoh Amenemhat II. Also called Zaaset.
Sihathor	Pharaoh	13th dynasty	fl. c. 18th century BC	Ephemeral coregent of his brother Neferhotep I.
Simut called Kyky	Second Prophet of Amun	18th dynasty	fl. c. mid-14th century BC	Egyptian priest who held the position of Second Prophet of Amun towards the end of the reign of the 18th dynasty Pharaoh Amenhotep III. Simut was also treasurer (“Overseer of the House of Silver”) and “sealer of every contract in Karnak”.
Siptah Akhenre Setepenre	Pharaoh	19th dynasty	fl. c. late-13th to early-12th century BC	His father's identity is unknown with both Seti II and Amenmesse being suggested. Siptah succeeded to the throne as a child after the death of Seti II. Also known as Merneptah Siptah.
Sitamun	Queen	18th dynasty	fl. c. mid-14th century BC	Eldest daughter of Pharaoh Amenhotep III and his wife Tiye and later married her father.
Sitdjehuti	Queen	17th dynasty	fl. c. mid-16th century BC	Daughter of Pharaoh Senakhtenre Ahmose and the sister to Pharaoh Seqenenre Tao and the queens Ahhotep and Ahmose Inhapy. She was married to her (half-)brother Tao.
Sithathoriunet	Princess	12th dynasty	fl. c. mid-19th century BC	Possibly a daughter of Senusret II.
Sitre	Queen	19th dynasty	fl. ca 13th century BC	Wife of Pharaoh Ramesses I of Egypt and mother of Seti I. Also called Tia-Sitre.
Sitre In	Nurse	18th dynasty	fl. c. late-16th century BC	Nurse of the female pharaoh Hatshepsut.
Smendes Hedjkheperre Setepenre	Pharaoh	21st dynasty	fl. c. early to mid-11th century BC	First pharaoh of the 21st dynasty of Egypt (reigned c. 1077 BC – c. 1052 BC). He is thought to have been a powerful governor in Lower Egypt during the reign of Ramesses XI.
Smendes II	High Priest of Amun	21st dynasty	fl. c. early-10th century BC	Son of High Priest Menkheperre and Princess Isetemkheb, the daughter of Psusennes I. Also known as Nesbanebdjed II.
Smendes III	High Priest of Amun	22nd dynasty	fl. c. early-9th century BCE	Son of pharaoh Osorkon I, he officiated under the reign of the brother Takelot I. Also known as Nesbanebdjed III.
Smenkhkare	Pharaoh	18th dynasty	fl. c. mid-14th century BC	Probably a younger son of Amenhotep III and queen Tiye, and therefore a younger brother of Akhenaten.
Snaaib	Pharaoh	13th or Abydos Dynasty	fl. c. mid 17th century BC	Poorly known pharaoh of the late 13th or Abydos dynasty during the second intermediate period, close to the time of the Hyksos invasion.
Sneferu	Pharaoh	4th dynasty	reigned c. 2613 BC – c. 2589 BC	Built at least three pyramids at Dahshur (including the Bent Pyramid and the Red Pyramid) and Meidum (Meidum pyramid). He introduced major innovations in the design and construction of pyramids. Also known as Snefru, Snofru or Soris.
Sneferukhaf	Prince	4th dynasty	fl. c. 26th century BC	Son of Prince Nefermaat II and a grandson of Princess Nefertkau.
Sobekemhat	Vizier	12th dynasty	fl. c. mid-19th century BC	Egyptian vizier under king Senusret III during the 12th dynasty.
Sobekemsaf I	Pharaoh	17th dynasty	fl. c. early-16th century BC	Sekhemre Shedtawy Sobekemsaf reigned during the Second Intermediate Period. Sobekemsaf I is thought to have been the father of both Intef VI and Intef VII.
Sobekemsaf II Sekhemrewadjkhaw	Pharaoh	17th dynasty	fl. c. mid-16th century BC	May have reigned after Djehuti and Intef VI. Sobekemsaf's chief wife was Queen Nubemhet.
Sobekhotep I Sekhemrekhutawy	Pharaoh	13th dynasty	fl. c. mid-18th century BC	First pharaoh of the 13th dynasty, possibly a son of Amenemhat IV, otherwise, may have reigned later in the dynasty.
Sobekhotep II	Pharaoh	13th dynasty	fl. c. late-18th century BC	Egyptian king of the 13th Dynasty. He appears in the Turin King List as Sobekhotep and is otherwise mainly known from reliefs coming from a chapel set up in Abydos, from a pedestal of a statue and from a fragment of a column.
Sobekhotep III Sekhemresewdjtawy	Pharaoh	13th dynasty	fl. c. late-18th century BC	His father was Mentuhotep. His mother was Jewetibaw. The king had two wives, Senebhenas and Neni.
Sobekhotep IV Khaneferre	Pharaoh	13th dynasty	fl. c. early-17th century BC	Son of Haankhef and Kemi. His brother, Neferhotep I, was his predecessor on the throne.
Sobekhotep V	Pharaoh	13th dynasty	fl. c. early-17th century BC	Was an Egyptian king.
Sobekhotep VI	Pharaoh	13th dynasty	fl. c. early-17th century BC	Was an Egyptian king.
Merkawre Sobekhotep VII	Pharaoh	13th dynasty	fl. c. mid-17th century BC	Among the last pharaohs of the 13th dynasty, shortly before the Hyksos conquest of Lower Egypt.
Sobekhotep VIII Sekhemre Susertawi	Pharaoh	16th dynasty	fl. c. late-17th century BC	Believed to be the successor of Djehuti. He reigned over Upper Egypt during the time of the Hyksos conquest of Memphis and Lower Egypt.
Sobeknakht II	Governor	16th dynasty	fl. c. early-16th century BC	Local governor at El-Kab and a supporter of the Theban 16th dynasty during the Second Intermediate Period.
Sobekneferu	Pharaoh/ Queen	12th dynasty	reigned c. 1807 BC – c. 1803 BC	Daughter of Pharaoh Amenemhat III. Also known as Neferusobek.
Sonbef	Pharaoh	13th dynasty	fl. c. early-18th century BC	Second pharaoh of the 13th dynasty, possibly a son of Amenemhat IV. Also known as Amenemhat Sonbef.
Sosibius	Chief Minister	Ptolemaic	fl. c. late 3rd century BC	Chief minister of Ptolemy IV Philopator. He was able to exercise great power through his influence over the king throughout Ptolemy IV's reign. Based on Sosibius' advice, Ptolemy IV put to death his uncle Lysimachus, his brother Magas, and his mother Berenice.
Sosibius of Tarentum	Captain of the Guard	Ptolemaic	fl. c. mid-3rd century BC	One of the captains of the body-guards of Ptolemy II Philadelphus, king of Egypt. He may have been the father of the Sosibius, chief minister to Ptolemy IV Philopator.

== T ==
Name	Main title	Dynasty	Date	Comment
Tabekenamun	Queen	25th dynasty	fl. c. late-8th century BC	Daughter of King Piye and may have been a queen consort to her brother Taharqa or to Shabaka.
Tabiry	Queen	25th dynasty	fl. c. mid-8th century BC	Daughter of Alara of Nubia and his wife Kasaqa and the wife of King Piye.
Tadibast III	Queen	22nd dynasty	fl. c. mid-8th century BC	Mother of Osorkon IV and likely the wife of Shoshenq V.
Tadukhipa	Queen	18th dynasty	fl. c. mid-14th century BC	Daughter of Tushratta, king of Mitanni and his queen, Juni. Tushratta married his daughter to his ally pharaoh Amenhotep III to cement their two states' alliances. Amenhotep III died shortly after Tadukhipa arrived in Egypt so she eventually married his son and heir Akhenaten. Her name is sometime written as Tadu-Hepa.
Taharqa	Pharaoh	25th dynasty	reigned c. 690 BC – c. 664 BC	Son of Piye, the Nubian king of Napata who had first conquered Egypt. During his reign, Assyria forces under General Esarhaddon invaded Egypt and managed to conquer Lower Egypt putting Neto I on the throne in Sias.
Takabuti	Noble Woman	25th dynasty	8th century BC	A noble woman who lived in the city of Thebes during the 25th Dynasty. Her father, Nespare, was a priest of Amun. Due to a severe wound discovered on her body, it is presumed that she was murdered when she was between the age of 25-30.
Takahatenamun	Queen	25th dynasty	8th century BC	Daughter of King Piye and the sister-wife of King Taharqa.
Takelot I Hedjkheperre Setepenre	Pharaoh	22nd dynasty	reigned c. 885 BC – c. 872 BC	Son of Osorkon I and Queen Tashedkhonsu. He married Kapes who bore him a son, Osorkon II. Takelot I's authority was not fully recognised in Upper Egypt where a local Theban king challenged his authority.
Takelot II Si-Ese Hedjkheperre Setepenre	Pharaoh	23rd dynasty	reigned c. 840 BC – c. 815 BC	Pharaoh and High Priest of Amun, ruling Middle and Upper Egypt separately from the Tanite 22nd dynasty kings who at that time only controlled Lower Egypt.
Takelot III Si-Ese Usimare Setepenamun	Pharaoh	23rd dynasty	reigned c. 774 BC – c. 759 BC	Osorkon III's eldest son and successor and High Priest of Amun at Thebes.
Takhat	Queen	19th dynasty	fl. c. late 13th century BC	Mother of the usurper pharaoh Amenmesse. She was a queen consort to either Merenptah or Seti II.
Takhat	Queen-Mother	20th dynasty	fl. c. late 13th century BC	Mother of pharaoh Ramesses IX and probably the wife of Montuherkhepeshef, a son of Ramesses III.
Takhuit	Queen	26th dynasty	fl. c. 6th century BC	Wife of Psamtik II and the mother of Pharaoh Apries and the God's Wife of Amun Ankhnesneferibre.
Talakhamani	King of Kush		fl. c. mid-5th century BC	Kushite King of Meroe (reigned c. 435 BC – c. 431 BC). He may have been a son of Nasakhma and a younger brother of Malewiebamani. It is also possible Talakhamani was a son of Malewiebamani.
Tantamani	Pharaoh	25th dynasty	reigned c. 664 BC – c. 656 BC	After the Assyrians had appointed Necho I as king and left Egypt, Tantamani marched from Nubia, killed Necho I in battle and reoccupied all of Egypt. The Assyrians returned to Egypt defeated Tantamani's army and effectively ended Nubian control over Egypt. Also known as Tandaname, Tanwetamani or Tementhes.
Seqenenre Tao	Pharaoh	17th dynasty	fl. c. mid-16th century BC	Ruled over the local kingdoms of the Theban region of Egypt in the 17th dynasty (reigned c. 1558 BC – c. 1554 BC). He probably was the son and successor to Senakhtenre Ahmose and Queen Tetisheri. Also known as Sekenenra Taa.
Tashedkhonsu	Queen	22nd dynasty	fl. c. late-10th century BC	Wife of Pharaoh Osorkon I and the mother of Pharaoh Takelot I.
Tawerettenru	Queen	20th dynasty	fl. c. mid-12th century BC	Royal Wife of Ramesses V.
Tefibi	Nomarch of Asyut	10th dynasty	fl. c. 21st century BCE	Nomarch of Asyut, he helped an Herakleopolite pharaoh of the 10th dynasty in the reconquest of Thinis.
Tefnakht Shepsesre	Pharaoh	24th dynasty	reigned c. 732 BC – c. 725 BC	Libyan-descended prince of Sais, Great Chief of the Meshwesh and Great Chief of the Libu, and founder of the 24th dynasty of Egypt. Tefnakht established his capital at Sais and was able to unify many of the cities of the Delta region. Also known as Tnephachthos.
Tefnakht II	Local King	25th dynasty	fl. c. early-7th century BC	Native king who ruled Sais during the 25th Nubian Dynasty of Egypt.
Tentamun	Princess	18th dynasty	fl. c. late-15th century BC	Daughter of Thutmose IV.
Tentamun	Queen	20th dynasty	fl. c. late-12th century BC	Probably the wife of Ramesses XI, last ruler of the 20th dynasty.
Tentamun	Queen	21st dynasty	fl. c. mid-11th century BC	Wife of the 21st dynasty pharaoh Smendes. She was probably the daughter of Ramesses XI, last ruler of the 20th dynasty.
Tentkheta	Queen	26th dynasty	fl. c. mid-6th century BC	Wife of Amasis II. Daughter of a priest of Ptah named Padineith. She was the mother of Pharaoh Psamtik III. Also known as Tanetkheta
Teos	Pharaoh	30th dynasty	fl. c. mid-4th century BC	30th dynasty pharaoh of Egypt (reigned 362 BC – 360 BC) who was overthrown by Nectanebo II with the aid of Agesilaus II of Sparta and was forced to flee to Persia. The Persian king Artaxerxes II gave him refuge and Teos lived in Persian exile until his death.
Teta	Prince	4th dynasty	fl. c. 26th century BC	Son of Nefermaat, the eldest son of pharaoh Sneferu, and Itet.
Teti	Pharaoh	6th dynasty	reigned c. 2345 BC – c. 2333 BC	First pharaoh of the 6th dynasty of Egypt. Teti was either murdered by his palace bodyguards in a harem plot or assassinated by the usurper Userkare. Also known by the name Othoes.
Teti, Son of Minhotep	Temple Official	17th dynasty	16th century BC?	Egyptian official in Coptos during the reign of the Seventeenth Dynasty Pharaoh, Nubkheperre Intef. Known from the Coptos Decree, which deprives him of his office and its stipend for some act of sacrilege.
Tetisheri	Queen	17th dynasty	fl. c. mid-16th century BC	Wife of pharaoh Senakhtenre Ahmose and the mother of Seqenenre Tao, Queen Ahhotep I and possibly Kamose.
Tey	Queen	18th dynasty	fl. c. mid-14th century BC	Wife of Kheperkheprure Ay who was a pharaoh of Egypt's 18th dynasty.
Thamphthis	Pharaoh	4th dynasty	fl. c. mid-25th century BC	Greek name of an Egyptian king of the 4th dynasty. His original Egyptian name is lost, but it may have been Djedefptah or Ptahdjedef.
Thutmose I	Pharaoh	18th dynasty	reigned c. 1506 BC – c. 1493 BC	During his reign, he campaigned deep into the Levant and Nubia, pushing the borders of Egypt further than ever before. He built many temples throughout Egypt and was the first pharaoh to build a tomb for himself in the Valley of the Kings. His name is sometimes written as Thothmes, Thutmosis or Tuthmosis I.
Thutmose II	Pharaoh	18th dynasty	reigned c. 1493 BC – c. 1479 BC	Son of Thutmose I and Queen Mutnofret. He built some minor monuments and initiated some minor campaigns. Thutmose II was probably strongly influenced by his wife and royal half-sister Hatshepsut.
Thutmose III	Pharaoh	18th dynasty	reigned c. 1479 BC – c. 1425 BC	During the early years of his reign, he was co-regent with his stepmother, Hatshepsut, who was named the pharaoh. After her death, he created the largest empire Egypt had ever seen. He conducted at least seventeen campaigns and he conquered lands from northern Syria to the fourth cataract of the Nile.
Thutmose IV	Pharaoh	18th dynasty	reigned c. 1401 BC – c. 1391 BC	Son of Amenhotep II and Tiaa. Known for the restoration of the Sphinx at Giza.
Thutmose	Prince	18th dynasty	fl. c. mid-14th century BC	Eldest son of pharaoh Amenhotep III and Queen Tiye. His apparent early death led to Akhenaten becoming the successor to Amenhotep III. Also known as Djhutmose.
Thutmose	Sculptor	18th dynasty	fl. c. mid-14th century BC	Official court sculptor of the Egyptian Pharaoh Akhenaten in the latter part of his reign. Also known as Djhutmose or Thutmosis
Thutmose	Vizier	18th dynasty	fl. c. mid-14th century BCE	Vizier during the reign of Amenhotep III, was the father of Ptahmose.
Thutmose	Vizier	19th dynasty	fl. c. mid-13th century BC	Vizier during the latter part of the reign of Ramesses II.
Tia	Princess	19th dynasty	fl. c. mid-13th century BC	Daughter of Pharaoh Seti I and Queen Tuya and the elder sister of Ramesses II. Married to a noble man also called Tia. Buried with her husband in Saqqara.
Tiaa	Queen	18th dynasty	fl. c. late-15th century BC	Wife of Pharaoh Amenhotep II and the mother of Thutmose IV.
Tiaa	Princess	18th dynasty	fl. c. early-14th century BC	Daughter of Pharaoh Thutmose IV.
Tiaa	Queen	19th dynasty	fl. c. late-13th century BC	Possibly a wife of Pharaoh Seti II.
Tiye	Queen	18th dynasty	fl. c. early to mid-14th century BC	Daughter of Yuya and Tjuyu. She was the Great Royal Wife of pharaoh Amenhotep III and matriarch of the Amarna family from which many members of the royal family of Ancient Egypt were to come.
Tiye	Queen	20th dynasty	fl. c. early-12th century BC	Wife of Ramesses III. She instigated a failed "harem conspiracy" to kill the king and place Tiye's son Pentawer on the throne, instead of the appointed heir, who was the son of queen Iset Ta-Hemdjert.
Tiy-Merenese	Queen	20th dynasty	fl. c. early-12th century BC	Wife of Setnakhte and mother of Ramesses III. Her name is sometimes written as Teye-Merenaset or Tiye-Mereniset.
Tjahapimu	Prince and regent	30th dynasty	fl. 4th century BCE	Prince, regent of Egypt during the reign of his brother Teos, and father of the future pharaoh Nectanebo II.
Tjanefer	Fourth Prophet of Amun	21st dynasty	fl. c. late-11th century BC	21st dynasty Egyptian priest. His father was Nesipaherenmut, the Fourth Prophet of Amun, his mother was Isetemheb. He married Gautseshen, the daughter of High Priest Menkheperre and Princess Isetemkheb.
Tjuyu	Noblewoman	18th dynasty	fl. c. early-14th century BC	Egyptian noblewoman and the mother of queen Tiye, wife of pharaoh Amenhotep III. Also known as Thuya, Thuyu and Tuya.
Tlepolemus	Regent, Military Governor	Ptolemaic	fl. c. late-3rd century BC	Regent of Egypt during the reign of the boy king Ptolemy V. Tlepolemus was military governor of Pelusium when the regent Agathocles and his family were overthrown and killed in a popular uprising. Tlepolemus briefly took Agathocles' place as regent until he was replaced by Aristomenes of Alyzia.
Tryphaena	Queen	Ptolemaic	c. 141 BC – 111 BC	Ptolemaic princess and Seleucid queen. She was the oldest daughter of the Egyptian king Ptolemy VIII and Cleopatra III. She married the Seleucid king Antiochus VIII Grypus and was queen of Syria (124 BC – 111 BC).
Tsenhor	Businesswoman	27th dynasty	c. 525 BC	Businesswoman and funeral director.
Tutankhamun	Pharaoh	18th dynasty	c. 1341 – c. 1323 BC	Reigned c. 1333 BC – c. 1323 BC. He married his half sister, Ankhesenpaaten, who later changed her name to Ankhesenamun. He ended the worship of the god, Aten and restored the god Amun to supremacy. The capital of Egypt was moved back to Thebes.
Tutkheperre Shoshenq	Pharaoh	22nd dynasty	fl. c. early-9th century BC	22nd dynasty Libyan king of Egypt.
Tutu	Official	18th dynasty	fl. c. 14th century BC	Egyptian official, was one of pharaoh's officials during the Amarna letters period.
Tuya	Queen	19th dynasty	fl. c. early-13th century BC	Wife of Pharaoh Seti I and mother of Ramesses II. Also known as Tuy and Mut-Tuya.
Twosret	Pharaoh, Queen	19th dynasty	fl. c. early 12th century BC	Last pharaoh of the 19th Dynasty of Egypt. She was a royal wife of Seti II. She was regent to Seti's heir Siptah. When Siptah died, Twosret officially assumed the throne. Twosret's reign ended in a civil war leading to her successor Setnakhte founding the 20th dynasty. Also known as Tawosret and Tausret.
Tyti	Queen	20th dynasty	fl. c. late-12th century BC	Egyptian queen of the 20th dynasty. She may have been married to Ramesses X.

== U ==
Name	Main title	Dynasty	Date	Comment
Udjahorresnet	Official	26th-27th dynasty	fl. c. late-6th century BCE	High official who made a remarkable career under Cambyses II and Darius I during the first Persian domination (27th dynasty).
Udjebten	Queen	6th dynasty	fl. c. 23rd or 24th century BC	Wife of Pharaoh Pepi II. Her name is also written as Wadjebten.
Unas	Pharaoh	5th dynasty	reigned c. 2375 BC – c. 2345 BC	Last 5th dynasty pharaoh of Egypt. Unas may have had two queen consorts, Khenut and Nebit. His name is also written as Oenas, Unis, Wenis, or Ounas.
Useramen	Vizier	18th dynasty	fl. c. mid-15th century BC	Vizier of Egypt under Hatshepsut and Tuthmosis III. Also known as User and Amenuser.
Userhet	Overseer of the Fields of Amun	18th dynasty	fl. c. mid-15th century BC	Buried in the Valley of the Kings, in tomb KV45. He probably lived during the rule of Thutmose IV.
Userkaf	Pharaoh	5th dynasty	reigned c. 2498 BC – c. 2491 BC	First 5th dynasty king of Egypt. He started the tradition of building sun temples at Abusir. He constructed the Pyramid of Userkaf complex at Saqqara.
Userkare	Pharaoh	6th dynasty	fl. c. 24th century BC	Considered to be either a usurper to the throne after Teti or he could have been a son of Teti and Queen Khuit.
Usermontu	Vizier	18th dynasty	fl. c. mid-14th century BC	Served during the reign of Pharaoh Tutankhamun.

== W ==
Name	Main title	Dynasty	Date	Comment
Wadjmose	Prince	18th dynasty	fl. c. late-16th century BC	Son of Pharaoh Thutmose I.
Wadjitefni	Prince	2nd Dynasty	fl. c. early 28th century BC	Son of a king of the early 2nd Dynasty.
Wahibre Ibiau	Pharaoh	13th dynasty	fl. c. mid-17th century BC	Egyptian king of the 13th Dynasty.
Wahkare Khety	Pharaoh	fl. c. 21st century BCE	Pharaoh likely of the 10th dynasty of Egypt controlling territories based around Herakleopolis.	
Wahtye	Priest	5th dynasty	fl. 25th century BCE	High-ranking priest and official whose tomb was uncovered in 2018 in the Saqqara necropolis and was the subject of the Netflix documentary Secrets of the Saqqara Tomb.
Webensenu	Prince	18th dynasty	fl. c. late-15th century BC	Son of Pharaoh Amenhotep II.
Wegaf Khutawyre	Pharaoh	13th dynasty	fl. c. late-19th century BC	Egyptian king of the 13th Dynasty, also known as Ugaf.
Wehemka	Prince	4th dynasty	fl. c. 26th century BC	Son of Nefermaat, the eldest son of pharaoh Sneferu and Itet.
Wendjebauendjed	Official	21st dynasty	fl. c. 13th century BCE	General, high official and priest under pharaoh Psusennes I, known for his undisturbed tomb and its relative treasure at Tanis.
Weneg	Pharaoh	2nd dynasty	fl. c. 28th century BC	Royal Nebti name of a pharaoh during the 2nd dynasty of Egypt. He is assumed to have been a king who ruled Egypt between Nynetjer and Khasekhemwy. He is also referred to as Wneg or Wadjnes or Tlas.
Wenennefer	High Priest of Osiris	19th dynasty	fl. c. 13th century BCE	High Priest of Osiris under pharaoh Ramesses II.
Weni the Elder	Court Official, General	6th dynasty	fl. c. late 24th to early 23rd centuries BC	Court official of the 6th dynasty of Egypt. He began his career under Teti, and served as a general under Pepi I Meryre and as governor of Upper Egypt during the reign of Merenre Nemtyemsaf I.
Wenshet	Princess	4th dynasty	c. 2500 BCE	Priestess of Hathor and Neith
Wentawat	Viceroy of Kush	20th dynasty	fl. c. 12th century BC	Wentawat (also written as Wentawuat), was Viceroy of Kush under Ramesses IX. Wentawat was possibly a son of the Viceroy Hori II
Wepwawetemsaf	Pharaoh	13th, 16th or Abydos dynasty	fl. c. 17th century BC	Poorly known pharaoh during the second intermediate period.
Wetka	Prince	4th dynasty	fl. c. 26th century BC	Son of Prince Khufukhaf I and Nefertkau II, and a grandson of Khufu.
Wazad	Pharaoh	14th dynasty	fl. c. 1700 BC	Pharaoh of Canaanite descent reigning over the eastern Nile Delta during the second intermediate period.

== Y ==
Name	Main title	Dynasty	Date	Comment
Ya'ammu	Pharaoh	14th or 16th dynasty	c. early-18th or 17th century BC	Possibly an early semitic pharaoh of the eastern Nile Delta during the second intermediate period. Alternatively a vassal of the Hyksos kings.
Yakareb	Pharaoh	14th dynasty	fl. c. 17th century BC	Semitic pharaoh of the eastern Nile Delta during the second intermediate period.
Yakbim	Pharaoh	14th or 16th dynasty	c. early-18th or 17th century BC	Possibly, an early semitic pharaoh of the eastern Nile Delta during the second intermediate period. Alternatively a vassal of the Hyksos kings.
Yanhamu	Official	18th dynasty	fl. c. 14th century BC	Egyptian commissioner mentioned in the 1350-1335 BC Amarna letters correspondence. His name has also been read as Yenhamu, and Enhamu.
Yaqub-Har	Pharaoh	14th or 15th dynasty	fl. c. late-17th century BC	Either a pharaoh of the 14th dynasty reigning over the eastern Nile Delta or a vassal of the Hyksos kings during Egypt's fragmented Second Intermediate Period.
Yuny	Steward	19th dynasty	fl. c. early to mid-13th century BC	Official during the reign of pharaoh Ramesses II. He served as chief scribe of the court, the overseer of priests and royal steward. Yuni started building projects at Amara West and Aksha. His name is sometimes written as Iuny.
Yuya	Master of the Horse	18th dynasty	fl. c. early-14th century BC	Egyptian courtier of the 18th dynasty of Egypt. He was the King's Lieutenant and Master of the Horse. He married Tjuyu who held high offices in governmental and religious hierarchies. Their daughter, Tiye, became queen to Amenhotep III. His name is sometimes written as Iouiya.
Yuyu	High Priest of Osiris	19th dynasty	fl. c. 13th-12th century BCE	High Priest of Osiris under Ramesses II and Merenptah, and a grandson of Wenennefer.

== Z ==
Name	Main title	Dynasty	Date	Comment
Zamonth	Vizier	12th dynasty	c. 1800 BC	Also known as Samonth. Ancient Egyptian vizier who was in office at the end of the Twelfth Dynasty.
Zannanza	Hittite Prince	18th dynasty	c. 14th century BC	(died c. 1324 BC) Son of Suppiluliuma I, king of the Hittites. He is best known for almost becoming the Pharaoh of Egypt and because his death caused a diplomatic incident between the Hittite Empire and Egypt, that resulted in warfare.
Zoser	Pharaoh	3rd dynasty	c. 27th century BC	See Djoser

== See also ==
- List of Egyptians

Other articles including lists of ancient Egyptians:

- List of pharaohs
- List of children of Ramesses II
- Great Royal Wife (including list of title holders)
- God's Wife of Amun (including list of title holders)
