= Kheti =

Kheti or Khety was an Ancient Egyptian name, borne by pharaohs and other nobility.

The name may refer to:

== Pharaohs of the 9th or 10th Dynasty ==
- Meryibre Khety, a pharaoh of the First Intermediate Period
- Nebkaure Khety, a pharaoh of the First Intermediate Period
- Wahkare Khety, a pharaoh of the First Intermediate Period
- Khety III, purported author of the Teaching for King Merykara, a treatise on kingship; could be Wahkare Khety

== Nobles ==
- Khety I (nomarch), in Asyut during the 9th or 10th Dynasty
- Khety II (nomarch), in Asyut during the 10th Dynasty and grandson of Khety I
- Khety (BH17), nomarch in Men'at Khufu during the 11th Dynasty, buried in Beni Hasan
- Kheti (treasurer), during the 11th Dynasty
- Kheti, vizier famous for his impartiality, mentioned in the Installation of the Vizier and possibly to be identified with the one below
- Kheti (vizier), c. 1800 BC, under Amenemhat III of the 12th Dynasty, mentioned in a papyrus found at Lahun
- Khety (M12.3), an officer during the late 12th Dynasty
- Kheti, or Dua-Kheti, author of The Satire of the Trades and possibly Instructions of Amenemhat

== See also ==
- Kheyti, an Indian environmental startup
