= Tefibi =

Ancient Egyptian nomarch

Tefibi (Itj-ibj)
- Nomarch of the 13th nome of Upper Egypt
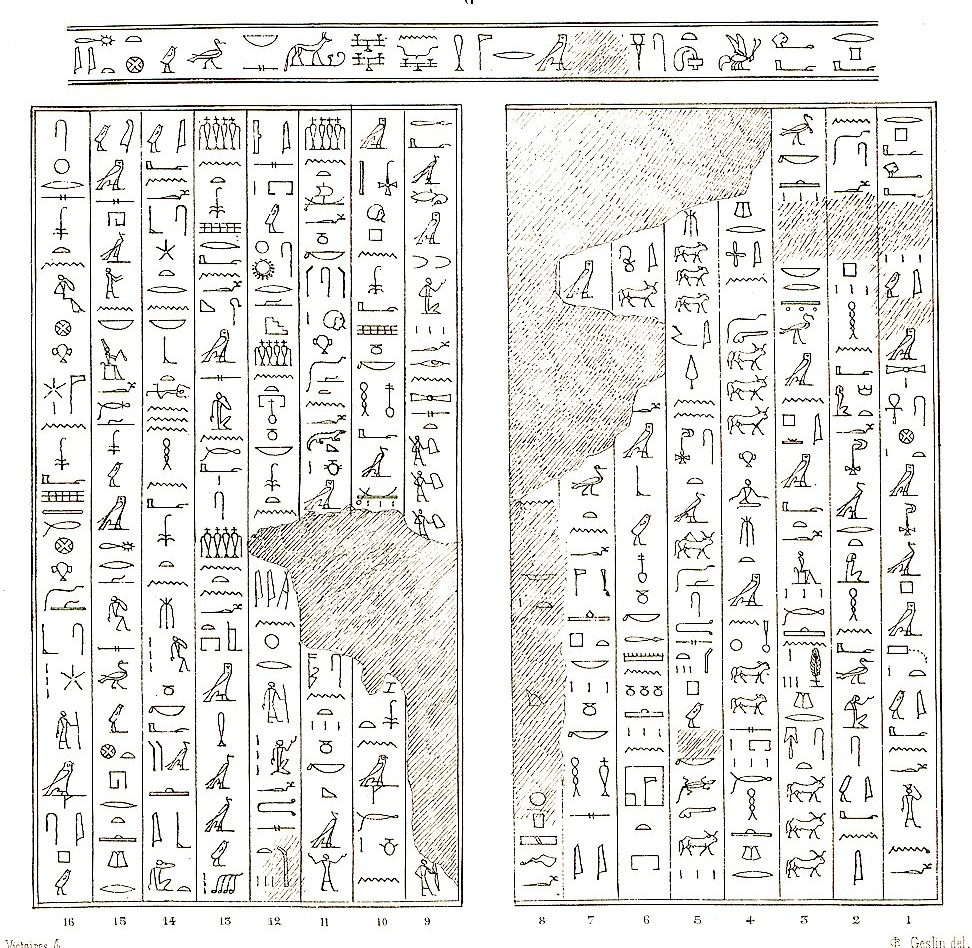
- Drawing of a wall of Tefibi's tomb
- Predecessor: Khety I
- Successor: Khety II
- Dynasty: 10th Dynasty
- Pharaoh: Wahkare Khety and Merykare
- Father: Khety
- Children: Khety
- Burial: Asyut, tomb III

Tefibi (or Itj-ibj – It(.i)ib(.i) – in a more modern reading) was an ancient Egyptian nomarch of the 13th nome of Upper Egypt ("the Upper Sycamore") during the 10th Dynasty (c. 21st century BCE, during the First Intermediate Period). In addition, he also was hereditary prince, count, wearer of the royal seal, sole companion and high priest of Wepwawet. The main source about his life came from his biography, inscribed on the "tomb III" in Asyut.

It is generally assumed that Tefibi was the second of a trio of related nomarchs datable to the Herakleopolite period; he was likely preceded by his father Khety and followed by his son, also named Khety.

== Biography ==
He was member of a long line of nomarchs in Asyut with strong bonds of loyalty and friendship towards the Herakleopolite dynasty, and seems that he continued the policy of good governance pursued by his father Khety I: in fact, Tefibi praised the safety and the respect of the laws in his nomos.
When the Thebans extended their influences on Thinis and Abydos, the Herakleopolite pharaoh (who is generally believed to be Wahkare Khety) and Tefibi rallied their troops, and swiftly regained Thinis. Their undisciplined soldiers sacked the sacred necropolis, as reported by the king himself in the Teaching for King Merykare.

Tefibi died during the reign of king Merikare, who installed Khety II, son of the deceased, as nomarch in Asyut.
