= Khety I (nomarch) =

Ancient Egyptian nomarch

- Nomarch of the 13th nome of Upper Egypt
- Successor: Tefibi
- Dynasty: 10th dynasty
- Burial: Asyut, tomb V
- Children: Tefibi

Khety I was an ancient Egyptian nomarch of the 13th nome of Upper Egypt ("the Upper Sycamore") during the 10th dynasty (c. 21st century BCE, during the First Intermediate Period). Like many other local governors, he also was a priest of the native deity Wepwawet.

It is generally assumed that Khety I was the earliest of a trio of related nomarchs datable to the Herakleopolite period; he was likely followed by his son Tefibi and then by his grandson Khety II.

== Biography ==
He was member of a long line of nomarchs in Asyut with strong bonds of loyalty and friendship towards the Herakleopolite dynasty: as a child he was raised along with the herakleopolite royal princes and their father – the pharaoh – appointed Khety as nomarch and also joined the mourning for the death of Khety's grandfather.

Khety ruled his nome during a peaceful period, and is known that he ordered the realization of many new irrigation canals and imposed the maintenance of the existing ones, thus expanding the cultivable land. During a period of famine caused by a particularly small Nile flood, he bestowed grain to the people of his district, although he denied the grain to the inhabitants of the neighboring nomoi, also affected by famine, by closing the borders of his district. Although he ruled during peaceful times, Khety boasted his ability as a warrior and ordered the organization of a provincial defence militia.

After his death, Khety was buried in Asyut (tomb V) and his titles passed to his son Tefibi, who is likely to have lived during the reign of Wahkare Khety and Merykare.
