= Headless Pyramid =

Egyptian pyramid complex of unclear king

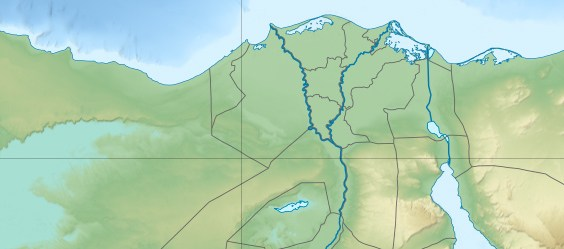
- Location within Lower Egypt
- 29°52′31″N 31°13′25″E
- Owner: Menkauhor (probably); Merikare (possibly)
Ancient name
- < G5 Y5 D28 D28 D28 > R8 D21 Q1 Q1 Q1 O24
- Nṯr-ỉswt Mn-kꜣw–ḥr
- Netjer-isut Menkauhor
- 'Divine are the places of Menkauhor'
- or
- < G5 M17 D28 G43 > R8 D21 Q1 Q1 Q1 O24
- Nṯr-ỉswt Ỉkꜣw-Ḥr
- Netjer-isut Ikauhor
- 'Divine are the places of Ikauhor'
- or
- < N5 U6 D28 > M13 Q1 Q1 Q1 O24
- wꜣḏ-swt Mry-kꜣ-rꜥ
- Wadj-sut Merikare
- 'Fresh are the places of Merikare'
- Constructed: Fifth Dynasty (probably); Tenth Dynasty (possibly)
- Type: True (now ruined)
- Material: Limestone
- Base: ~ 52 m (171 ft; 99 cu); ~ 60 m (200 ft; 110 cu); ~ 65 m (213 ft; 124 cu) by 68 m (223 ft; 130 cu)

The Headless Pyramid, otherwise identified as Lepsius XXIX or Steinpyramide XXIX, is the remain of a pyramid complex built in Saqqara. The identity of the pyramid owner is unclear, though it is suspected to belong to either pharaoh Menkauhor of the Fifth Dynasty (Note: Proposed dates for Menkauhor's reign: 2422–2414 BC, 2421–2414 BC, 2389–2381 BC, 2373–2366 BC, 2364–2355 BC, 2348–2340 BC.) or pharaoh Merikare of the Tenth Dynasty, (Note: Proposed dates for Merikare's reign: for an unknown duration between 2160–2055 BC, 2150–2040 BC, 2118–1980 BC, or 2100–2050 BC.) both of whom are known to have built a pyramid. If associated with Menkauhor, the pyramid's name is either Nṯr-ỉswt Mn-kꜣw-ḥr meaning 'Divine are the places of Menkauhor' or Nṯr-ỉswt Ỉkꜣw-Ḥr meaning 'Divine are the places of Ikauhor' referencing Menkauhor's birthname; if associated with Merikare, the pyramid's name is Wꜣḏ-swt Mry-kꜣ-rꜥ meaning 'Fresh are the places of Merikare'. Other candidates for the pyramid owner that have been proposed are Amenemhat I of the Twelfth Dynasty (Note: Proposed dates for Amenemhat I's reign: 1994–1964 BC, 1991–1962 BC, 1985–1956 BC, 1939–1910 BC, 1938–1908 BC.) and an ephemeral pharaoh Ity of the Eighth Dynasty. (Note: Proposed dates for Ity's reign: 2287–2285 BC assuming that Ity is Userkare, otherwise for an unknown duration between 2181–2160 BC, 2150–2118 BC, or 2150–2040 BC.)

The pyramid complex is in very poor condition. Only the main pyramid, its substructure, and the mortuary temple can be definitively identified. Trace elements of a cult pyramid and a causeway exist, however, there is no sign of an extant valley temple. The base of the pyramid superstructure has been measured by various Egyptologists as being 52 m (171 ft; 99 cu), 60 m (200 ft; 110 cu), or 65 m (213 ft; 124 cu) by 68 m (223 ft; 130 cu) long. Its substructure was thoroughly investigated between 2005 and 2008 by a team of archaeologists led by Zahi Hawass. Their findings included lowered portcullis gates indicating a burial had taken place, a sarcophagus lid built of schist, and holes cut into the burial chamber floor presumed to have held canopic jars.

== Location and excavation ==
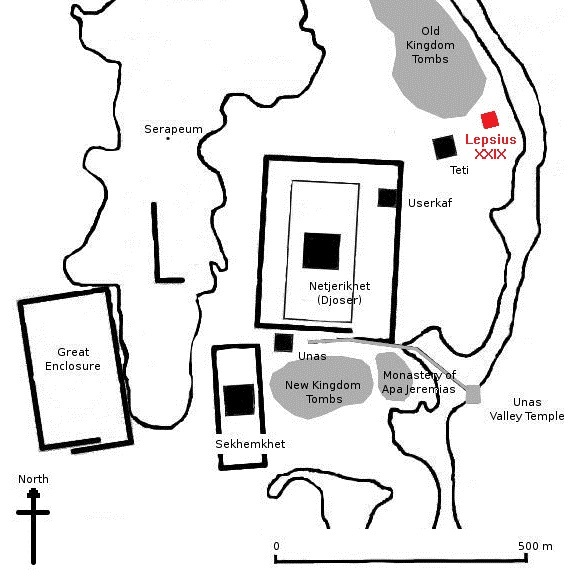
Map of Saqqara with the Headless Pyramid marked in red

Karl Richard Lepsius visited the site in 1843, providing brief description and cataloguing it as 'Steinpyramide XXIX' in his pyramid list. Gaston Maspero entered the underground chambers in 1881, searching the ruins for evidence of Pyramid Texts. Alessandro Barsanti was active in Saqqara in 1900, clearing a section of the pyramid. A brief and unsystematic excavation of the ruins was conducted in 1930 by Cecil M. Firth. The most systematic investigation of the site was conducted between 2005 and 2008 by a team led by Zahi Hawass.

== Mortuary complex ==
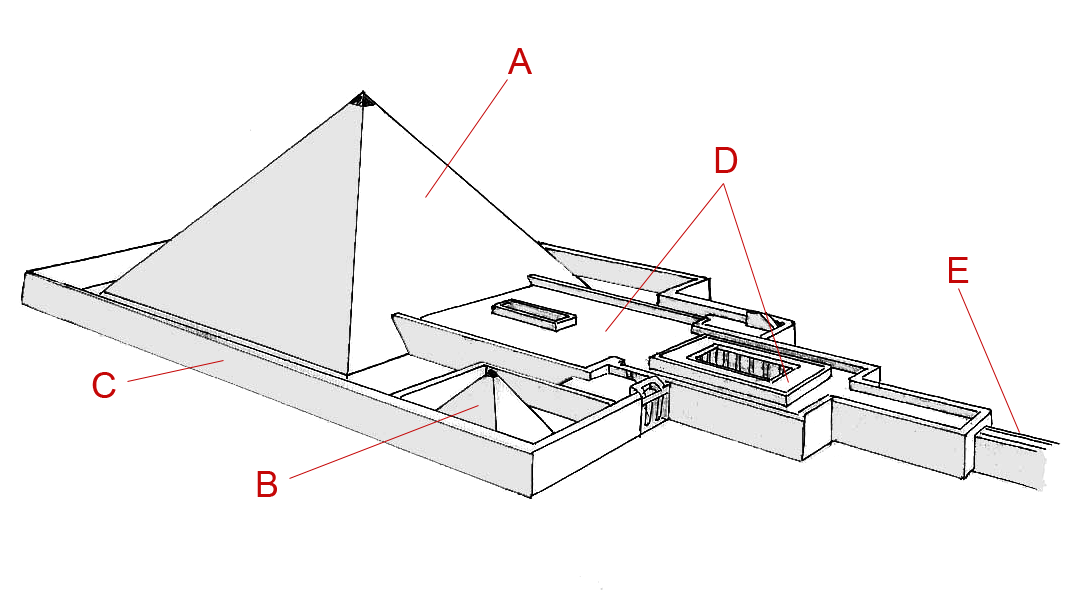
A typical Fifth Dynasty pyramid complex

=== Layout ===
Old Kingdom mortuary complexes typically consist of five main components: (1) a valley temple; (2) a causeway; (3) a mortuary temple; (4) a cult pyramid; and (5) the main pyramid. The 'Headless Pyramid' has an identifiable main pyramid with substructure and a mortuary temple. There are scant remains of a presumed cult pyramid and causeway, but no trace of a valley temple. The complex is overall in very poor condition.

=== Main pyramid ===
The pyramid had a base length of approximately 65 m (213 ft; 124 cu) by 68 m (223 ft; 130 cu) according to Celeste Rinaldi and Vito Maragioglio; a base length of approximately 60 m (200 ft; 110 cu) according to Lepsius; or a base length of approximately 52 m (171 ft; 99 cu) according to Firth. Virtually nothing remains of the superstructure, hence its local Arabic name of 'Headless Pyramid'. This pyramid was enclosed by an enclosure wall constructed from mudbrick.

=== Substructure ===
The entrance to the substructure lies in the approximate middle of the pyramid's north face. The descending passage was probably 7.6 m (25 ft) long, though its original entrance point now lies under a house and thus cannot be completely excavated. The remains of the passage are limited, though it appears to have had a downward slope of 30° and a fine white limestone paving. The passage terminates into a hall 2.75 m (9.0 ft) north-south by 2.06 m (6.8 ft) east-west with fine white limestone-lined walls. Beyond the hall is a granite-lined passage sealed by two pink granite portcullises. The passage measures 5.6 m (18 ft) in length and had an estimated ceiling height of 3.8 m (12 ft), and the portcullis stones were found to be 0.5 m (1.6 ft) thick. The sealing of the passage indicates that a burial had been conducted. A second corridor 7 m (23 ft) in length then leads to the ante- and burial- chambers. The antechamber has been obliterated and retains no walls, but its size could be estimated by outlines left on the ground, indicating the chamber was 3.2 m (10 ft) long. The burial chamber is in markedly better condition allowing it to be measured as approximately 8 m (26 ft) east-west by 3.2 m (10 ft) north-south, with walls that reached a height of at least 4.15 m (13.6 ft), and a floor originally paved with fine white limestone. Inside the burial chamber, the intact lid of a sarcophagus made of grey schist was uncovered. The lid measured 2.65 m (8.7 ft) by 1.09 m (3.6 ft) and was found covering holes cut in the floor presumed to have held canopic jars. Finally, adjoining the antechamber is a presumed serdab though nothing but an outline of it remains, indicating a possible size of 3.85 m (12.6 ft) east-west by 3.2 m (10 ft) north-south.

=== Mortuary temple and cult pyramid ===
The adjoining mortuary temple of the pyramid is known by its local Arabic name as 'Joseph's prison'. To the south, bounded by the enclosure wall, were the remains of another smaller building presumed to be the cult pyramid.

=== Causeway, and valley temple ===
There are trace remains of a causeway leading towards the fertile ground east of the pyramid, though no trace of a valley temple has been uncovered.

== Ownership ==
The date of construction and the identity of the owner of the Headless Pyramid remain indeterminate, though scholars have suggested and presented evidence to support conclusions favouring various pharaohs and dates spanning the Old Kingdom, the First Intermediate Period, and the Middle Kingdom. An absolute attribution remains impossible due to the lack of textual evidence. Consequently, the ascriptions of Egyptologists to a pharaoh are provisional.

=== Menkauhor ===
Jean-Philippe Lauer and Jean Leclant, whilst working on the nearby pyramid of Teti, conjectured that the Headless Pyramid might have been built by Menkauhor. They based their assessment on the manner in which Teti's causeway was displaced south and on the masonry used in the pyramid. Vito Maragioglio and Celeste Rinaldi affirmed the hypothesis further after finding the substructure access corridor offset east of the north–south axis – a distinct feature of pyramid substructures between Neferirkare Kakai's and Djedkare Isesi's reigns – and on failing to uncover any pyramid texts. Jocelyn Berladini assessed the textual evidence available in the late 1970s drawing the same conclusion. However, Rainier Stadelmann noted that the presence of a Third Dynasty mastaba breaching the wall of the Headless Pyramid indicated that it had been constructed much earlier. Instead, a decree issued by Pepi I of the Sixth Dynasty discovered in the pyramid town of Sneferu's Red Pyramid mentioning Menkauhor's pyramid has been used to attribute Lepsius L, found immediately northeast, to Menkauhor by Stadelmann and Ludwig Borchardt, though this attribution is strongly contested. The text of the decree relating to Menkauhor's pyramid reads:

- M17 G43 V24 G43 N35 U36 F35 D21 N35 W25 N35 X1 A1 A1 A1 V30 D21 M8 G1 D46 G43 A24 G17 D21 Z1 O1 N35 < G5 M17 D28 G43 > R8 Q1 Q1 Q1 O24
- ỉw wḏ-n ḥnỉ nfr-n ỉnt rmt nb r šꜣdw m rꜣ-pr n nṯr-ỉswt Ỉkꜣw-Ḥr
- My Majesty commands that no one shall be sent to dig in the temple of the pyramid 'Divine are the places of Ikauhor' (Note: There is a slight variation in the name of the pyramid in the decree from other sources. In Pepi I's decree nṯr is written as 𓊹, whereas it is written as 𓊹 𓂋 in the mastaba of Ptahhetep and Akhethetep and in the tomb of Min-anhk.)

A systematic excavation of the substructure was conducted between 2005 and 2008 led by Zahi Hawass which corroborates the assignment to the Fifth Dynasty. Although no inscriptions bearing the name of a pharaoh were found, Hawass attributed it to Menkauhor as he is the only pharaoh of the Fifth Dynasty whose pyramid has remained unidentified. Hawass cites the lack of pyramid texts to indicate a dating prior to the end of the Fifth Dynasty or to the Middle Kingdom, the architectural style of the complex to dating to around Djedkare-Isesi, the style of the portcullis stones to pre-dating Djedkare-Isesi, the extensive use of quality materials indicative of the economic abundance of the Fifth Dynasty, and the presence of tombs connected to Menkauhor's mortuary cult as evidence for ascribing the pyramid to Menkauhor.

=== Ity ===
Firth's excavations retrieved slight material that led him to ascribe the pyramid to an ephemeral pharaoh Ity, attributed to the Eighth Dynasty. Firth, however, believed that Ity was contemporaneous to Teti, of the Sixth Dynasty, being either a preceding or succeeding king. One hypothesis conjectures that Ity and Userkare are the same pharaoh, who reigned for a brief two years following Teti. He also identified the pyramid's name as Bau Ity meaning 'the Ba souls of Ity' from an inscription found at Wadi Hammamat.

=== Merikare ===
In 1994, Jaromír Málek proposed that the Headless Pyramid was the long-sought pyramid of Merikare, belonging to Merikare of the Tenth Dynasty. Málek identified a block near the site containing a partial name of Merikare, alongside the presence of two tombs of officials associated with Merikare near the pyramid, as evidence for the hypothesis. It is known that the pyramid is sited near to Teti's in northern Saqqara and thus the Headless Pyramid is an ideal candidate, particularly considering that no other pyramids of the Fifth Dynasty are in its immediate vicinity. Ahmed Fakhry, citing Firth's discoveries of false doors and coffins belonging to cult priests of Merikare, has also suggested the Headless Pyramid as being Merikare's. There are no other candidate pyramids for Merikare.

=== Amenemhat I ===
Dieter Arnold, after considering Amenemhat I's re-use of Old Kingdom pyramid blocks in his monument in El-Lisht, noted that one specific block dating to the period originates from neither Lepsius XXIX nor Lepsius L, and proposed that Menkauhor's pyramid – the presumed origin point for the block – is as yet undiscovered, lying somewhere in South Saqqara. David Silverman proposes that the pyramid might belong instead to Amenemhat I based on texts from the tombs of Ihy and Hetep and on the siting of the pyramid in relation to the others in the area. Josef Wegner adds that the presence of the mortuary cult for Teti during the Middle Kingdom might be another indicator for a dating to the reign of Amenemhat I.

== See also ==
- List of Egyptian pyramids

== Sources ==
- Allen, James; Allen, Susan; Anderson, Julie; et al. (1999). Egyptian Art in the Age of the Pyramids. New York: The Metropolitan Museum of Art. ISBN 978-0-8109-6543-0. OCLC 41431623.
- Bárta, Miroslav (2005). "Location of the Old Kingdom Pyramids in Egypt" (PDF). Cambridge Archaeological Journal. 15 (2). Cambridge: 177–191. doi:10.1017/s0959774305000090. S2CID 161629772. Archived from the original (PDF) on 2020-02-28.
- Borchardt, Ludwig (1905). "Ein Königserlaß aus Dahschur". Zeitschrift für Ägyptische Sprache und Altertumskunde (in German). 41–42 (1): 1–42. ISSN 2196-713X.
- Brovarski, Edward (1999). "First Intermediate Period, royal tombs". In Bard, Kathryn (ed.). Encyclopedia of the Archaeology of Ancient Egypt. London; New York: Routledge. pp. 380–382. ISBN 978-0-203-98283-9.
- Clayton, Peter A. (1994). Chronicle of the Pharaohs. London: Thames & Hudson. ISBN 978-0-500-05074-3.
- Couyat, Jean; Montet, Pierre (1912). Les Inscriptions Hiéroglyphiques et Hiératiques du Ouâdi Hammâmât. Mémoires publiés par les membres de l'Institut Français d'Archéologie Orientale du Caire (in French). Vol. 34. Le Caire: l'Institut Français d'Archéologie Orientale du Caire. OCLC 560019358.
- Davies, Normal (1900). The mastaba of Ptahhetep and Akhethetep at Saqqara. London: Egypt Exploration Fund.
- Dennis, James (1905). "New Officials of the IVth to Vth Dynasties". Proceedings of the Society of Biblical Archaeology. Vol. XXVII. London: The Offices of the Society. pp. 32–34.
- Dodson, Aidan; Hilton, Dyan (2004). The Complete Royal Families of Ancient Egypt. London: Thames & Hudson. ISBN 0-500-05128-3.
- Firth, Cecil (1930). "Report on the Excavations of the Department of Antiquities at Saqqara (November, 1929–April, 1930)". Annales du service des antiquités de l'Egypte. Vol. XXX. Le Caire: l'Institut Français d'Archéologie Orientale. pp. 185–189. OCLC 297892940.
- Grimal, Nicolas (1992). A History of Ancient Egypt. Translated by Ian Shaw. Oxford: Blackwell Publishing. ISBN 978-0-631-19396-8.
- Hawass, Zahi (2010). "The excavation of the headless pyramid, Lepsius XXIX". Perspectives on ancient Egypt : studies in honor of Edward Brovarski. Cairo: Supreme Council of Antiquities. pp. 153–170. ISBN 9789777040877.
- Krauss, Rolf; Warburton, David (2006). "Conclusions and Chronological Tables". In Hornung, Erik; Krauss, Rolf; Warburton, David (eds.). Ancient Egyptian Chronology. Leiden: Brill. pp. 473–498. ISBN 978-90-04-11385-5.
- Málek, Jaromír (1994). "King Merykare and his Pyramid". Hommages à Jean Leclant. Vol. 4. Paris: Institut Français D'Archéologie Orientale (Le Caire). pp. 203–214. ISBN 2-7247-0138-0.
- Lehner, Mark (2008). The Complete Pyramids. New York: Thames & Hudson. ISBN 978-0-500-28547-3.
- Leprohon, Ronald J. (2013). The Great Name: Ancient Egyptian Royal Titulary. Writings from the ancient world. Vol. 33. Atlanta: Society of Biblical Literature. ISBN 978-1-58983-736-2.
- Lepsius, Karl Richard (1970) [1849]. Denkmäler Aus Ägypten und Äthiopen (in German). Osnabrück: Biblio Verlag. OCLC 84318033.
- Porter, Bertha; Moss, Rosalind (1981) [1927]. Málek, Jaromír (ed.). The Topographical Bibliography of Ancient Egyptian Hieroglyphic Texts, Reliefs, and Paintings. Vol. III, 2 (2nd ed.). Oxford: Griffith Institute, Ashmolean Museum. ISBN 0-900416-238.
- Shaw, Ian, ed. (2003). The Oxford History of Ancient Egypt. Oxford: Oxford University Press. ISBN 978-0-19-815034-3.
- Theis, Christoffer (2010). Kahl, Jochem; Kloth, Nicole (eds.). "Die Pyramiden der Ersten Zwischenzeit. Nach philologischen und archäologischen Quellen". Studien zur Altägyptischen Kultur (in German). 39. Hamburg: Helmut Buske Verlag GmBH: 321–339. ISBN 978-3-87548-584-4.
- Verner, Miroslav (2001). The Pyramids: The Mystery, Culture and Science of Egypt's Great Monuments. New York: Grove Press. ISBN 978-0-8021-1703-8.
- von Beckerath, Jürgen (1984). Handbuch der ägyptischen Königsnamen. München: Deutscher Kunstverlag. ISBN 9783422008328.
- Wilkinson, Toby (2010). The Rise and Fall of Ancient Egypt. London: Bloomsbury. ISBN 978-1-4088-1002-6.
- Wright, Jonathan (2008). "Eroded pyramid attributed to early pharaoh". Reuters. Archived from the original on June 12, 2018.
