= Gemniemhat =

- Royal sealer, Steward, Overseer of the granaries
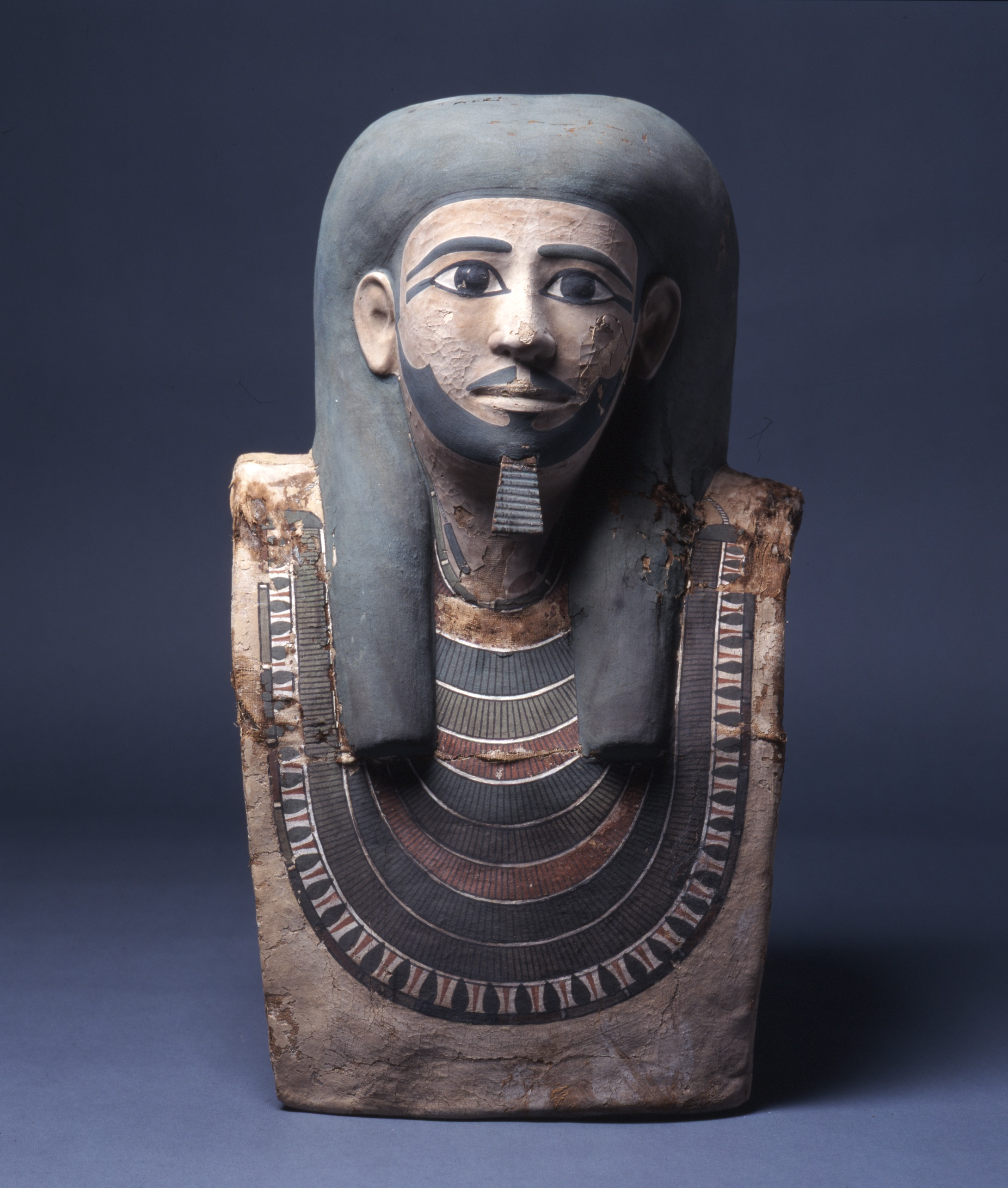
- Mummy mask of Gemniemhat; (ÆIN 1625). Ny Carlsberg Glyptotek museum.
- Tenure: c. 2000 BC
- Burial: Saqqara, Giza, Egypt

Gemniemhat (also called Gemni; fl. c. 2000 BC) was an ancient Egyptian official who is known from his well preserved burial excavated at Saqqara. Gemniemhat dates to the end of the First Intermediate Period or early Middle Kingdom. His burial was found by Cecil Firth in 1921, who excavated part of the cemeteries around the Pyramid of Teti. The burial of Gemniemhat was found at the bottom of a shaft and contained two decorated coffins. The head of the deceased was covered with a mummy mask. Around the coffins were found many wooden models showing the production of food, two female offering bearers and a small wooden statue of Gemniemhat. The objects are today in the Ny Carlsberg Glyptotek museum, although only the inner coffin could be preserved. Above ground there was a small mud brick mastaba decorated with a false door. Here, Gemniemhat bears several titles, including royal sealer, steward, overseer of the granaries. He was also funerary priest at the pyramid of king Merikare.
