= Khety II (nomarch) =

Ancient Egyptian nomarch

- Nomarch of the 13th nome of Upper Egypt
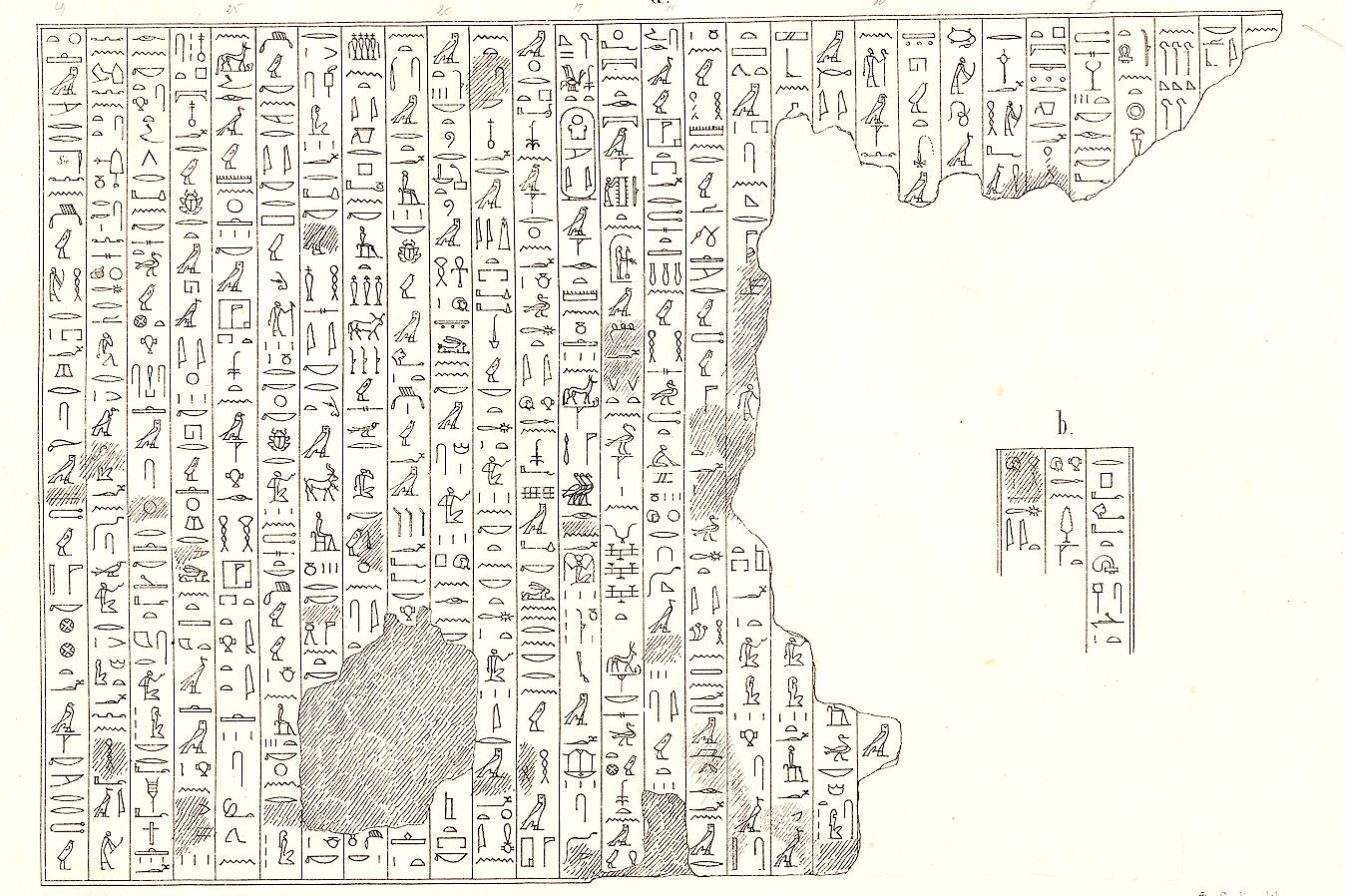
- Drawing of a wall of Khety II's tomb
Egyptian name
X t i i
- Predecessor: Tefibi
- Dynasty: 10th Dynasty
- Pharaoh: Merykare
- Burial: Asyut, tomb IV
- Father: Tefibi

Khety II was an ancient Egyptian nomarch of the 13th nome of Upper Egypt ("the Upper Sycamore") during the reign of pharaoh Merykare of the 10th Dynasty (c. 21st century BCE, during the First Intermediate Period).

== Biography ==
He was one of the last of a long line of nomarchs in Asyut with strong bonds of loyalty and friendship towards the Herakleopolite dynasty: his father was the nomarch Tefibi, himself son of the nomarch Khety I, and a Herakleopolite pharaoh had joined the mourning for the latter's grandfather (i.e. Khety II's great-great-grandfather).
After Tefibi's death, Khety II was installed as a nomarch by king Merykare himself, who sailed up the Nile with his court on a fleet. It is known that Khety II undertook some restoration works in the local temple of Wepwawet.

He was loyal to the 10th Dynasty until the end, and probably died shortly before the fall of Asyut by the Theban pharaoh Mentuhotep II of the 11th Dynasty, which preceded the final capitulation of Herakleopolis and thus the end of the civil war. Under the reign of Mentuhotep II, the old line of nomarchs represented by Khety II and his ancestors was replaced by a new, pro-Theban one.

His unfinished tomb at Asyut (no. IV) is the best preserved among the tombs of his relatives, which are unfortunately ruined, and it is also the only one mentioning a royal name (Merykare). It has been excavated several times since the late 19th century, most recently in 2003–2006.
