= Neferkare VIII =

Egyptian Pharaoh

Pharaoh
- Reign: between 2130 and 2040 BCE
- Predecessor: Meryhathor
- Successor: Wahkare Khety
Royal titulary
Prenomen
Neferkare
nfr-k3-rˁ
Beautiful is the ka of Ra
< N5 F35 D28 >
- Dynasty: 10th Dynasty

Neferkare VIII was the second pharaoh of the 10th Dynasty of ancient Egypt (between 2130 and 2040 BCE, during the First Intermediate Period).

The praenomen "Neferkare" suggests he considered himself a legitimate successor of Pepi II Neferkare of the 6th Dynasty, much like the many namesake Memphite kings of the Eighth Dynasty. He likely was the eighth king to bear this name – hence the "VIII" – although many of his predecessors are sometimes called by a combination of their praenomen and nomen (for example, Neferkare Tereru, or Neferkare Khendu).

He is definitely attested only on the Turin King List, since he is not known by any archaeological find. It is highly unlikely that Neferkare VIII and the enigmatic king Ka-nefer-re mentioned in the tomb of the nomarch Ankhtifi are the same person, and it is somewhat more likely that Kaneferre should rather be identified with Neferkare VII of the previous 9th Dynasty.
