= Pyramid of Merikare =

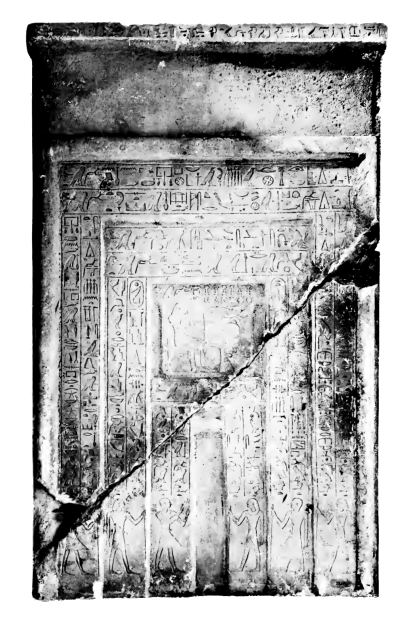
- This stele from Saqqara, of the priest Anpuemhat, mentions pyramids of both Merikare and Teti
- Owner: Merikare, Tenth Dynasty
Ancient name
< ra U6 kA > M13 Q1 Q1 Q1 O24
Wadj-sut Merikare
wꜣḏ-swt Mry-kꜣ-rꜥ
Fresh are the places of Merikare
- Constructed: c. 2040 BC

The pyramid of Merikare is an ancient Egyptian pyramid that remains unidentified, but is attested by inscriptions on funerary steles and possibly is located in Saqqara. The pyramid is presumed to be the burial place of the Herakleopolitan pharaoh Merikare, who ruled toward the end of the Tenth Dynasty c. 2040 BC during the First Intermediate Period. Sometimes, the Headless Pyramid in North Saqqara is identified as the pyramid of Merikare, although the latter is more likely to belong to pharaoh Menkauhor.

== Attestations ==
Although undiscovered, the pyramid of Merikare is the only attested pyramid of a king belonging to the Herakleopolitan dynasties (the Ninth and Tenth). The pyramid is known by nine inscriptions, eight of which are from northern Saqqara; while the ninth is of unknown origin. From those inscriptions it is known that the ancient name of the pyramid was "Wadj Sut Merikare" variously translated as "Flourishing are the abodes of Merikare" or "The fresh places of Merikare". All these inscriptions were found in the tombs of priests and at least four of these priests were responsible for the funerary cult of both kings Merikare and the earlier Sixth Dynasty king, Teti. The priests lived during the early Twelfth Dynasty (1991 BC - 1802 BC), demonstrating that the funerary cults of these kings remained active during the Middle Kingdom and, most importantly, that Merikare's pyramid must have been in the vicinity of the pyramid of Teti, in Saqqara.

== Identification ==
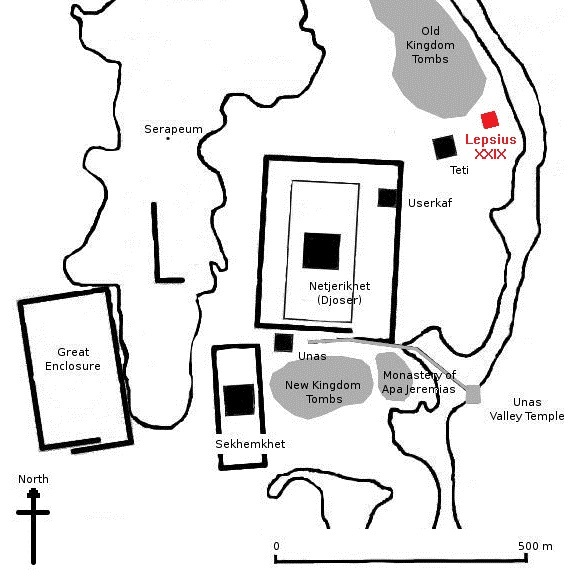
Map of Saqqara - in red, the Headless Pyramid (Lepsius XXIX), initially identified with Merikare, but sometimes identified as that of Menkauhor Kaiu

Using the funerary steles of the twelfth dynasty priests, Cecil Mallaby Firth believed to have found the pyramid of Merikare in 1926 on the southeast corner of that of Teti. The structure identified by Firth later turned out to be the small cult pyramid of Teti's pyramid complex.

Another hypothesis emerged in the second half of the twentieth century identifying the pyramid of Merikare with the Lepsius pyramid no. XXIX, located in Saqqara-north and commonly known as the Headless Pyramid. Later, this hypothesis was rejected by some scholars such as Jocelyne Berlandini who proposed in 1979 that the Headless Pyramid is more likely to belong to the Fifth Dynasty pharaoh Menkauhor, the only Fifth Dynasty ruler whose pyramid had not been identified formally. Berlandini based her conclusion on the construction techniques featured in the pyramid as well as the fact that, to a great extent, the priests of the funerary cult of Menkauhor were buried in northern Saqqara.

In 1994, however, Jaromir Malek published a study arguing again that Merikare is the owner of the Headless Pyramid. For example, Malek points out that no burials dating to the Fifth Dynasty are located in the immediate vicinity of the Headless Pyramid.

In 2008, continuing excavations on the site of the Headless Pyramid under the direction of Zahi Hawass corroborated Berlandini's assignment of it to the Fifth Dynasty. This conclusion was reached based on evaluations of the structure of the monument as well as the construction materials employed, both being typical of that era. Although no inscriptions naming a pharaoh were uncovered, Hawass attributed the pyramid to Menkauhor since he is the only pharaoh of the Fifth Dynasty whose pyramid had not been identified. If Berlandini and Hawass are correct, then the pyramid of Merikare remains undiscovered, somewhere in the sands of Saqqara.

== See also ==
- List of Egyptian pyramids
- Egyptian pyramid construction techniques

== Bibliography ==
- Christoffer Theis, Die Pyramiden der Ersten Zwischenzeit. Nach philologischen und archäologischen Quellen. Studien zur Altägyptischen Kultur, Bd. 39, 2010, pp. 321–339.
