= Ankhtifi =

Nomarch of Hierakonpolis of Ancient Egypt

- Nomarch of the 3rd nome of Upper Egypt
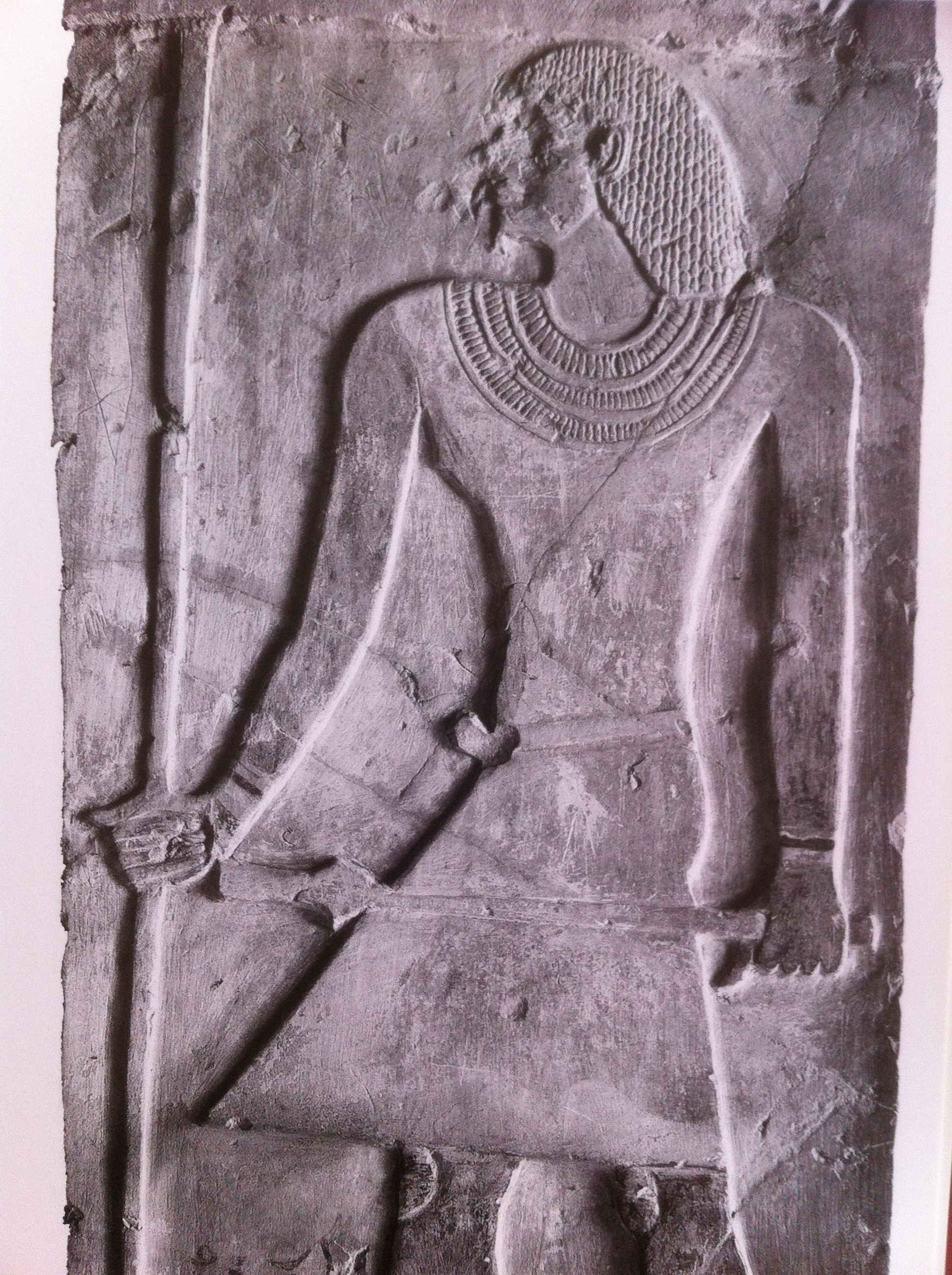
- Ankhtifi from his tomb at el-Mo'alla
- Dynasty: 10th dynasty
- Pharaoh: Ka-nefer-Re (identified with either Neferkare VII or Neferkare VIII)
- Burial: El-Mo'alla

Ankhtifi (or Ankhtify) was an ancient Egyptian nobleman, administrator, and military commander. The nomarch of Nekhen and a supporter of the pharaoh in Heracleopolis Magna (10th Dynasty), which was locked in a conflict with the Theban based 11th Dynasty kingdom for control of Egypt. Hence, Ankhtifi was possibly a rival to the Theban rulers Mentuhotep I and Intef I. He lived during the First Intermediate Period, after the Egyptian Old Kingdom state had collapsed, and at a time when economic hardship, political instability, and foreign invasion challenged the fabric of Egyptian society.

== Biography ==
The precise pharaoh under whom Ankhtifi served is anything but certain; the sequence and number of kings in the 9th and 10th dynasties is a matter of widely varying conjecture. Only a few of the many names on the much later king-lists have had their reigns or existence corroborated through scattered archaeological finds. The only pharaoh mentioned in Ankhtifi's tomb is in the following isolated inscription: "Horus brings/brought (or may Horus bring) a (good) inundation for his son Ka-nefer-Re." Some Egyptologists have proposed identifying this Ka-nefer-Re with the throne name Neferkare, attested only on the Turin Canon (and several times there) for this dynasty. However, uncertainty about the verb tense in the inscription has led to disagreement among various scholars as to whether this pharaoh "Neferkare" would have ruled in Ankhtifi's youth (Neferkare VII), or at the time of the events he describes (Neferkare VIII), or indeed if it were not a king Neferkare before Ankhtifi's time, who had ruled toward the end of the Old Kingdom from Memphis.

Ankhtifi, as nomarch or governor of the third nome of Upper Egypt, built and extensively decorated his tomb at El-Mo'alla, and inscribed the tomb’s walls with his autobiography, which details his initiatives in re-establishing order in the land, his resistance against Thebes, and the appalling suffering of the people of Egypt during his lifetime. It is one of the most significant inscriptions to come from the "dark ages" that begin with the collapse of the Old Kingdom, then become increasingly clearer with the approach of the Middle Kingdom, ca. 2000 BC. Ankhtifi states in his tomb autobiography:

The Prince, Count, Royal Seal-bearer, Sole Companion, Lector-priest, General, Chief of scouts, Chief of foreign regions, Great Chief of the nomes of Edfu and Hierakonpolis, Ankhtifi, says: Horus brought me to the nome of Edfu for life, prosperity, health, to re-establish it, and I did (it)...I found the House of Khuy inundated like a marsh, abandoned by him who belonged to it, in the grip of the rebel, under the control of a wretch. I made a man embrace the slayer of his father, the slayer of his brother, so as to re-establish the nome of Edfu (...) I was as concerned for the lowest of men as for the highest. I was the man who found the solution when it was lacking in the country thanks to poor decisions, and my speech was clever and my bravery won the day when it was necessary to join the three provinces together. I am an honest man who has no equal, a man who can talk freely when others are obliged to be silent.

The general of Armant said to me: 'Come, oh honest man. Sail with the current down to the fortress of Armant!' I then went down to the country to the west of Armant and I found that the forces of Thebes and Koptos had attacked the fortress of Armant (...) I reached the west bank of the Theban province (...) Then my courageous crack troops, yes my bold crack troops, ventured to the west and the east of the Theban nome, looking for an open battle. But no one dared to come out from Thebes because they were afraid of my troops.

(Inscriptions 1-3, 6-7, 10 and 12; Vandier, 1950, 161-242)

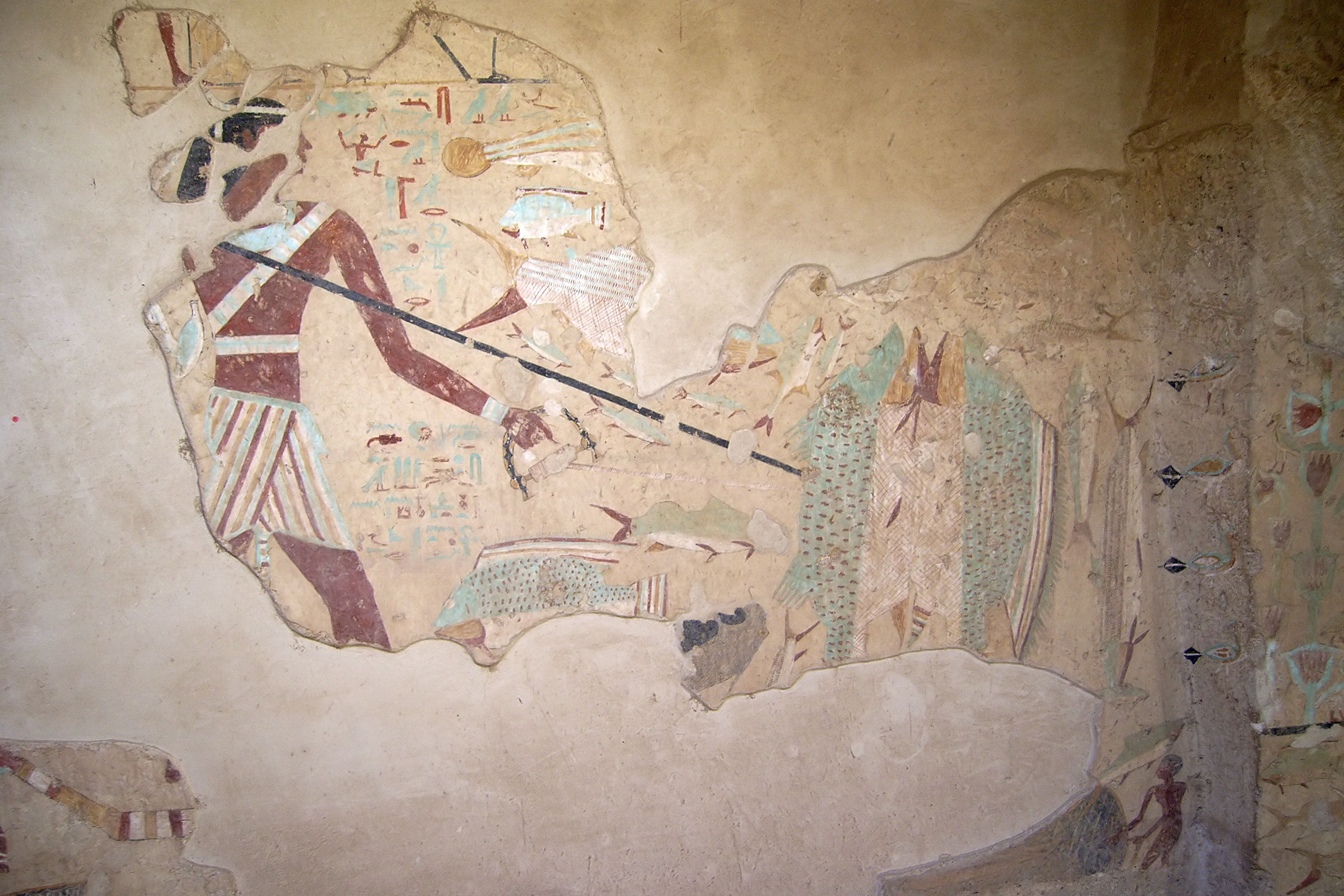
Fishing scene from the tomb of Ankhtifi at el-Mo'alla

I gave bread to the hungry and clothing to the naked; I anointed those who had no cosmetic oil; I gave sandals to the barefooted; I gave a wife to him who had no wife. I took care of the towns of Hefat [i.e. el-Moalla] and Hor-mer in every [situation of crisis, when] the sky was clouded and the earth [was parched (?) and when everybody died] of hunger on this sandbank of Apophis. The south came with its people and the north with its children; they brought finest oil in exchange for the barley which was given to them.

The whole of Upper Egypt died of hunger and each individual had reached such a state of hunger that he ate his own children. But I refused to see anyone die of hunger and gave to the north grain of Upper Egypt. And I do not think that anything like this has been done by the provincial governors who came before me....I brought life to the provinces of Hierakonpolis and Edfu, Elephantine and Ombos! (Inscriptions 1-3, 6-7, 10 and 12; Vandier, 1950, 161-242)

Ankhtifi's autobiography highlights the political fragmentation of Egypt during his career as nomarch of Hierakonpolis, because he describes himself "first of all as the chief of his province" or of his three nomes, rather than the governor of a region of Upper Egypt, as Pepi I's confidant Weni had done during the 6th Dynasty. His autobiography also suggests that he only became nomarch of Edfu after seizing it from Khuy, who was an ally of Thebes. While Thebes later defeated his forces, and won control over Edfu, Hierakonpolis and Elephantine under the Theban kings Intef I and Intef II, the completion of his tomb suggests that Ankhtifi was not personally defeated in battle himself.

== Economic crisis ==
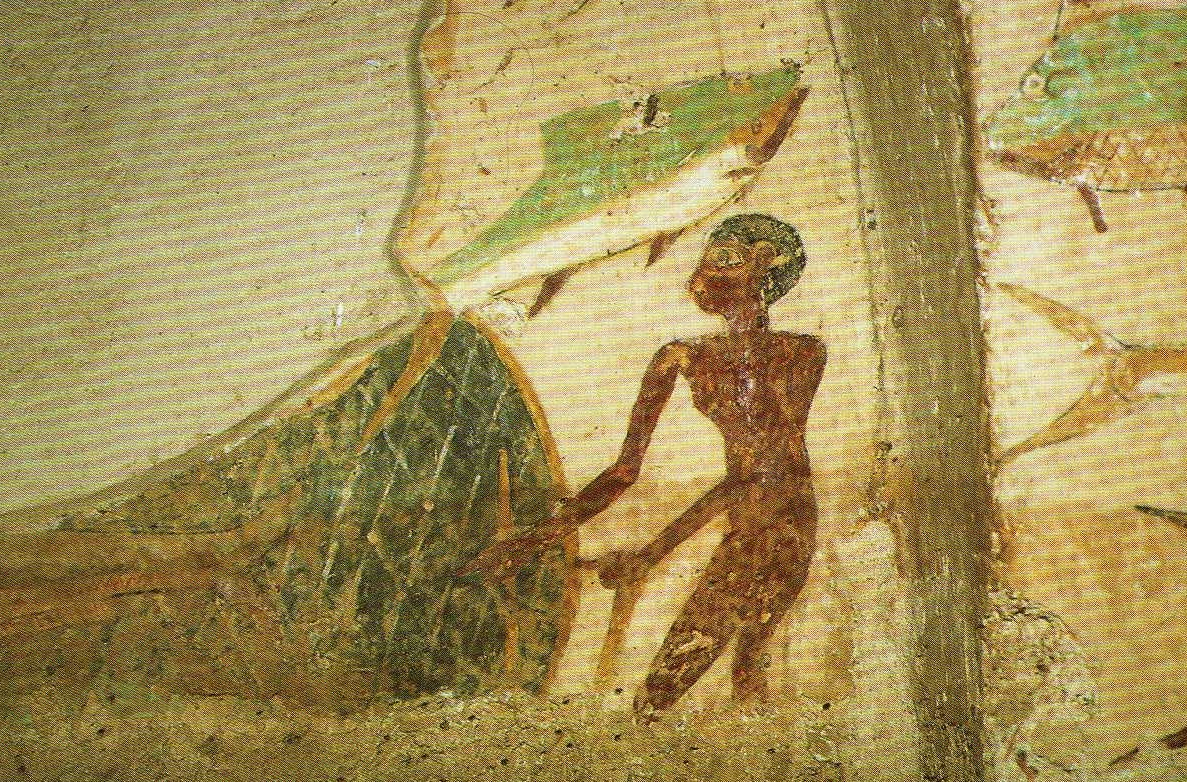
Another fishing scene from the tomb of Ankhtifi.

Ankhtify's autobiography implies that the fear of an economic crisis was endemic during the early First Intermediate Period, when local town magnates publicly boasted of their ability to feed their own towns while the rest of Egypt was starving. Other evidence of a famine afflicting the land during this Period comes from a worker of a Koptos 'overseer of priests', who modestly relates that he "stood in the doorway of his excellency the overseer of priests Djefy handing out grain to (the inhabitants of) this entire town to support it in the painful years of famine."

It was previously uncertain if a series of low annual Nile floods caused the mass famine, rather than the outbreak of chaos following the collapse of the Old Kingdom, since some archaeological observations from Elephantine had appeared to indicate that Egypt was actually experiencing slightly above average flood levels during the First Intermediate Period. However, since 2000, new archaeological evidence has suggested that Ankhtifi's comments concerning the severity of the famine--at least during the early First Intermediate Period--are indeed based on fact and not propaganda. An Egyptian scientist, Fekri Hassan from University College London, has put forth clear evidence that a sudden global climate change caused the complete drying up of Lake Faiyum—--a major body of water which was fed by the Nile and is 65 metres deep--between 2200 and 2150 BC, around the start of the Old Kingdom's collapse. The evaporation of the lake's water, which occurred over a period of many years, hints at the severity of the drought which affected Egypt during this time.
