= Meryhathor =

Egyptian pharaoh

- Meryt-Hathor, Mery-Hathor, Neferkare-Meryibre
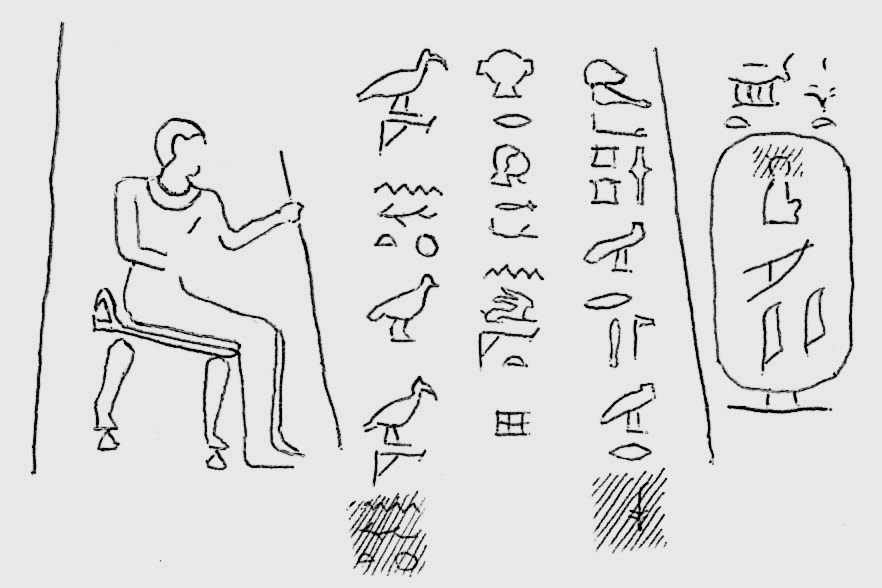
- The nomarch Djehutynakht II (left) and Meryhathor's cartouche (right), from Hatnub

Pharaoh
- Reign: c. 2130 BCE - ?
- Predecessor: H-, the last king of the 9th Dynasty
- Successor: Neferkare VIII
Royal titulary
Prenomen
Meryhathor
mr.j-j-ḥwt-ḥr
Beloved of Hathor
< C9 U6 i i > G7
Alternative reading
Meryibre
mr.j-j-rꜥ
Beloved of Ra
< C2 U6 i i > G7
- Father: H- (possibly)
- Dynasty: 10th Dynasty

Meryhathor or Meryt-Hathor, was a pharaoh of the 10th Dynasty of Egypt, during the First Intermediate Period.

== Identification ==
Regarded as the founder of the dynasty, Meryhathor should have begun his reign in c. 2130 BCE. His name is not mentioned in the Turin King List but Djehutynakht II, a nomarch of the Hare nome residing in Hermopolis, ordered an ink graffito mentioning Meryhathor in the alabaster quarries at Hatnub: this is so far the only attestation of this king.

There is a dispute regarding his name: since the "Hathor" sign (C9 in Gardiner's sign list) is partially damaged, some authors such as Edward Brovarski believe that the real name of this pharaoh could be Meryibre ("Beloved of the heart of Ra") which is somewhat closer to the Memphite tradition. Furthermore, some Egyptologists who support the alternative reading also combine this king with his successor Neferkare VIII; thus, it is not uncommon to find a pharaoh Neferkare-Meryibre as the founder of the 10th Dynasty.
