= Iytjenu =

Ancient Egyptian pharaoh

Pharaoh
Royal titulary
Prenomen
Iy-tjenu
iii Tnw
The one who has come distinguished
Alternative translation:
The ruler from Thinis has come

M23 X1 L2 X1	i i i T nw w
- Dynasty: First Intermediate Period

Iytjenu (The one who has come distinguished) was an ancient Egyptian king of the First Intermediate Period. Very little is known about him as he is only indirectly attested in the name of a woman called Zat-Iytjenu - Daughter of Iytjenu. The element Iytjenu within the woman's name is written with a royal cartouche. In this period the cartouche was only used for writing a king's name. Therefore, her name must refer to a king. The ruler's name is composed of two elements: Iy and Tjenu, both elements are also well attested as independent names. The position of the king within the First Intermediate Period remains highly speculative.

Zat-Iytjenu is only known from her false door (Egyptian Museum Cairo, JE 59158) excavated at Saqqara in about 1920 to 1922 by Cecil Firth. Firth never found time to publish the stela. However, a note on the king's name was written shortly after by Henri Gauthier in 1923. The false door was only fully published in 1963 by Henry George Fischer. Very little is known about Zat-Iytjenu. She bore the titles sole ornament of the king and Priestess of Hathor. Her relation to king Iytjenu is unknown. Royal names as part of private names are common in almost all periods of Ancient Egyptian history.
