= Heracleopolis =

Heracleopolis or Herakleopolis (Ancient Greek: Ἡρακλεόπολις, Herakleópolis) or Herakleiopolis (Ἡρακλειούπολις) may refer to:

- Heracleopolis Magna in Upper Egypt (now a ruin)
- Heracleopolis Parva or Sethroë in Lower Egypt, identified with the site of Tell Belim
- Heracleopolis (Crete), town of ancient Crete
- Heracleopolis, former name of modern Sulusaray
- Heracleopolis (Pontus), town of ancient Pontus
