= Meryibre Khety =

Egyptian pharaoh

- Meriibre, Meribre and Kheti, Akhtoy, Achthoes; Merybtawy, Meribtawy
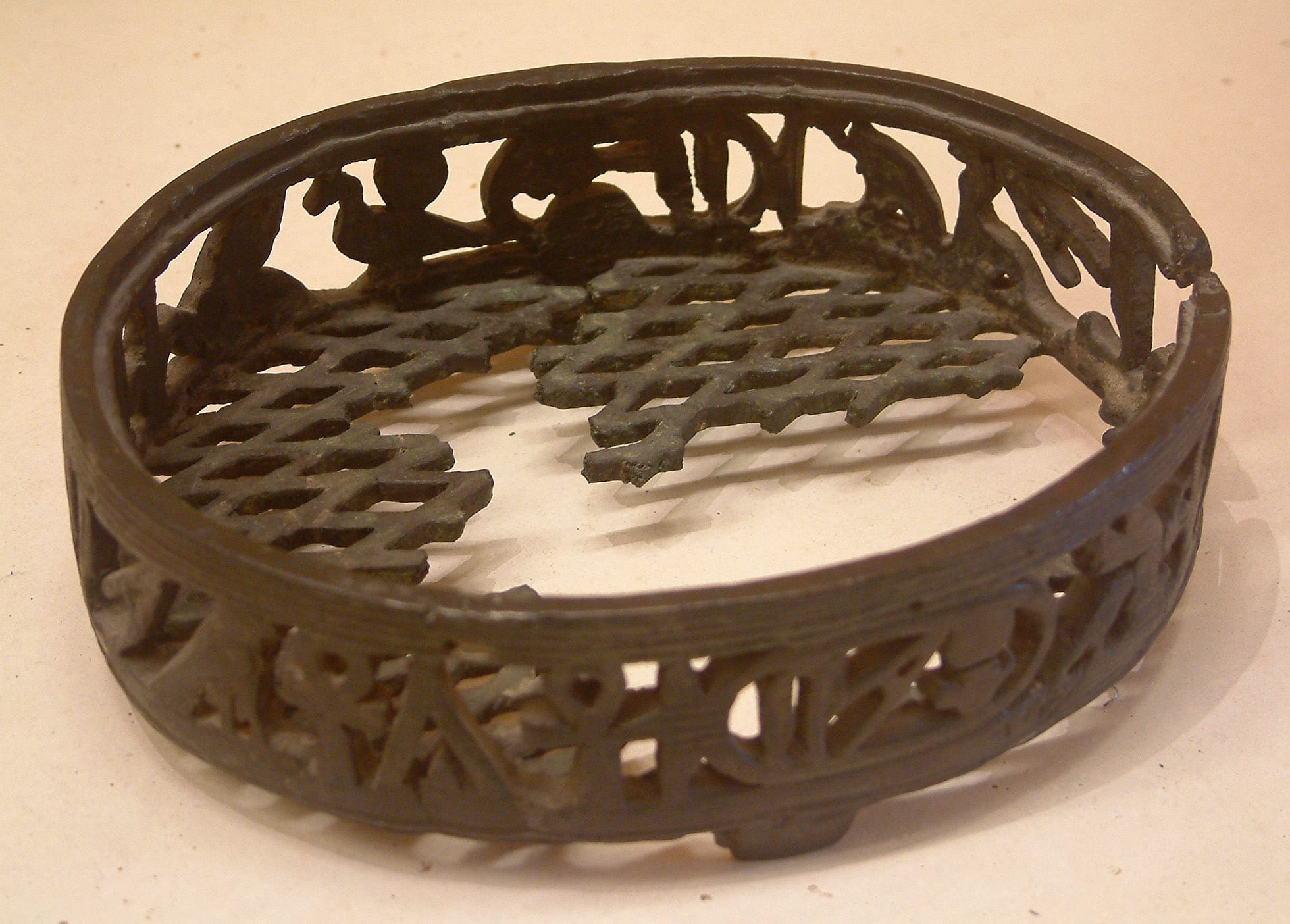
- Copper container with Meryibre Khety's royal titulary. Paris, Louvre.

Nomarch of Heracleopolis Magna and Pharaoh
- Reign: c. 2160 BCE – ?
- Predecessor: a pharaoh of the Eighth Dynasty
- Successor: Neferkare VII (not directly)
Royal titulary
Horus name
Meryibtawy
mr.j-j-jb-t3.wj
Horus, He who is loved by the heart of the Two Lands
G5	U7 ib i i N19
Nebty name
Meryibtawy
mr.j-j-jb-t3.wj
He who is loved by the heart of the Two Lands
G16	U7 ib i i N19
Golden Horus
Mery..?
mr.j..?
G8	U6?
Prenomen
Meryibre
mr.j-j-jb-rˁ
He who is loved by the heart of Ra

M23 X1 L2 X1	N5 U6 i i ib
Nomen
Khety
ẖtj(j)

G39 N5	X t i i
- Dynasty: 9th Dynasty (mainstream); 10th Dynasty (Von Beckerath)

Meryibre Khety, also known by his Horus name Meryibtawy, was a pharaoh of the 9th or 10th Dynasty of Egypt, during the First Intermediate Period.

== Reign ==
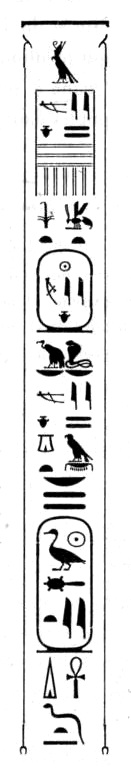
Drawing of an ebony wand bearing the titulary of Meryibre Khety.

Some scholars believe that Meryibre Khety was the founder of the 9th Dynasty, a Herakleopolitan nomarch who gathered enough authority to claim himself the legitimate successor of the 6th Dynasty pharaohs. It seems that Meryibre ruled over his neighboring nomarchs with an iron fist, and it is likely for this reason that in later times this ruler became Manetho's infamous Achthoes, a wicked king who went insane and then was killed by a crocodile.

Alternatively, other Egyptologists such as Jürgen von Beckerath believe instead that Meryibre reigned toward the end of the subsequent 10th Dynasty, shortly before king Merikare.

Because of the contrasting opinions of scholars, Meryibre's reign is difficult to account and date with reliability; if he really was the founder of the 9th Dynasty, his reign should have conventionally begun in c. 2160 BCE, while in the second case his reign should have started about a century later.

== Attestations ==
This ruler is known only for few objects, which are a sort of copper brazier or basket from a tomb near Abydos (found along with a scribe's palette bearing the name of king Merikare) now exhibited at the Louvre Museum, an ebony wand from Meir now at the Cairo Museum (JE 42835), an ivory casket fragment from Lisht and some other minor finds. Thanks to those few monuments, however, Meryibre's royal titulary is the most complete amongst the known pharaohs of this period.
