= Merikare =

Pharaoh of tenth dynasty of Ancient Egypt

- Merykare, Merykara
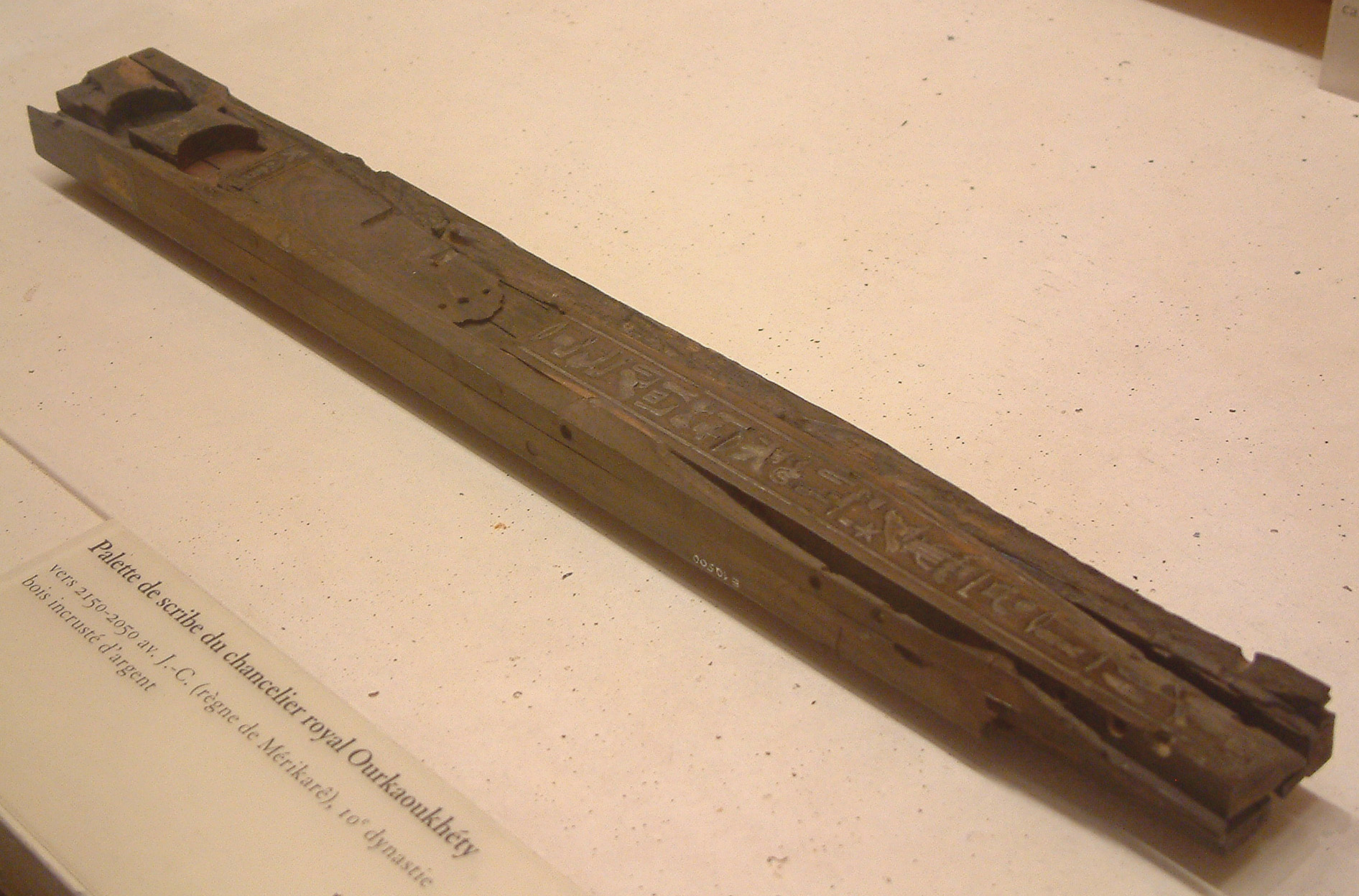
- Scribe palette of the chancellor Orkaukhety, bearing the cartouche of Merikare

Pharaoh
- Reign: 21st century BCE
- Predecessor: Wahkare Khety ?
- Successor: Mentuhotep II (11th Dynasty)
Royal titulary
Prenomen
Merikare
mr.j-k3-rˁ
Beloved by the ka of Ra

M23 X1 L2 X1	N5 U7 D28
Nomen
possibly Khety
Ḥty
- Father: Wahkare Khety ?
- Died: approximately 2040 BCE
- Burial: Pyramid of Merikare
- Dynasty: 10th Dynasty

Merikare (also Merykare and Merykara) was an ancient Egyptian pharaoh of the 10th Dynasty who lived toward the end of the First Intermediate Period.

Purportedly inspired by the teaching of his father, he embarked on a semi-peaceful coexistence policy with his southern rivals of the 11th Dynasty, focusing on improving the prosperity of his realm centered on Herakleopolis instead of waging an open war with Thebes. His policy was not rewarded, and after his death his kingdom was conquered by the Theban Mentuhotep II, marking the beginning of the Middle Kingdom. The existence of his pyramid has historically been ascertained, although it has not yet been discovered.

== Reign ==
=== Biography ===
According to many scholars, he ruled at the end of the 10th Dynasty in his middle-age, following a long reign by his father. The identity of his predecessor (the so-called "Khety III" who was the purported author of the Teaching for King Merikare) is still a question of debate among Egyptologists. Some scholars tend to identify Merikare's predecessor with Wahkare Khety. These sebayt ("teachings", in ancient Egyptian) – possibly composed during the reign of Merikare and fictitiously attributed to his father – are a collection of precepts for good governance. The text also mentions the eastern borders, recently secured, but still in need of the king's attention. In the text, Merikare's unnamed father mentions having sacked Thinis, but he advises Merikare to deal more leniently with the troublesome Upper Egyptian realms.

Once crowned, around 2075 BCE, Merikare wisely resigned himself to the existence of two separate kingdoms (the Herakleopolite and the Theban ones) and tried to maintain the policy of peaceful coexistence achieved by his father. It seems that the period of peace brought a certain amount of prosperity to Merikare's realm. Some time later, the pharaoh was forced to sail up the Nile with his court on a great fleet. Once he reached Asyut, the king installed the loyalist nomarch Khety II, who succeeded his deceased father Tefibi; he also made restorations at the local temple of Wepwawet. After that, Merikare advanced farther upstream to the town of Shashotep, likely to quell a revolt, and at the same time as a show of force to the turbulent southern border areas.

William C. Hayes argues that Merikare was the fourth and penultimate king of the Tenth Dynasty, based on his reading of the Turin King List. However, his reconstruction of the king list is outdated. There is no break between the Ninth and Tenth Dynasties in the list, and there is only space for 18 names. The existence of a 19th ruler is purely reliant on the much later account of Manetho, which is based on already corrupted sources.

=== Burial ===
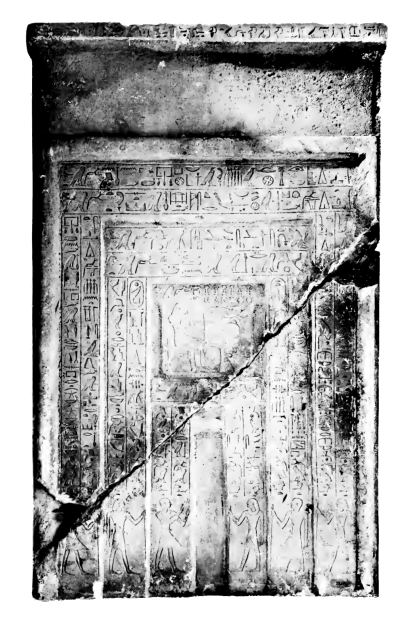
Stele of Anpuemhat, attesting the funerary cult of Merikare in Saqqara during the 12th Dynasty

Many sources suggest that Merikare was buried in a yet-undiscovered pyramid in Saqqara, called Flourishing are the Abodes of Merikare, that had to be near to the pyramid of Teti of the 6th Dynasty. The titles of the officials involved in its construction are documented, as his funerary cult endured into the 12th Dynasty; in fact, Merikare's cartouche appears on the stelae of at least four priests who were responsible for the funerary cult of Teti and Merikare during the Middle Kingdom. They include Gemniemhat who also held other important positions.

=== Attestations ===
Despite the fact that his name cannot be recognized in the Turin King List, Merikare is the most attested among the Herakleopolite rulers. His name appears on:

- the Teaching for King Merikare;
- a wooden scribe palette belonging to the chancellor Orkaukhety, found in a tomb near Asyut (along with a brazier dedicated to Meryibre Khety) and now at the Louvre;
- the inscriptions from the tomb of the nomarch Khety II, in Asyut;
- nine steles attesting the existence of his pyramid and his funerary cult in Saqqara.

== Theories ==
=== Hypothesis of an earlier reign ===
In 2003, the Egyptologist Arkadi F. Demidchik suggested that Merikare's placement within the dynasty should be reconsidered. According to him, if Merikare reigned during the campaign led by Mentuhotep II then the former's pyramid and its cult couldn't have survived the Theban conquest; again, Merikare likely would not be able to obtain granite from the South as mentioned in the Teachings. Demidchik also argued that the battles for Thinis mentioned by Tefibi and Merikare were the same, being fought in the opposite front by the Theban ruler Wahankh Intef II, thus suggesting that Merikare's reign should be placed some decades earlier than usually thought, when the 10th Dynasty's power was at its peak.
