= Mentuhotep =

Mentuhotep (also Montuhotep) is an ancient Egyptian name meaning "Montu is satisfied" and may refer to:

== Kings ==
- Mentuhotep I, nomarch at Thebes during the First Intermediate Period and first king of the 11th Dynasty
- Mentuhotep II, reunified Egypt at the end of the first intermediate period, thereby starting the Middle Kingdom of Egypt
- Mentuhotep III, successor of Mentuhotep II
- Mentuhotep IV, successor of Mentuhotep III, possibly overthrown by Amenemhat I, founder of the Twelfth Dynasty of Egypt
- Mentuhotep V, a ruler of the late 13th Dynasty during the Second Intermediate Period
- Mentuhotepi, ruler of the 16th Dynasty in Upper Egypt during the Second Intermediate Period
- Mentuhotep VI, a ruler of the late 16th Dynasty.

== Others ==
- Mentuhotep (treasurer)
- Mentuhotep (queen)
- Mentuhotep (god's father), father of king Sobekhotep III
