= Khety (M12.3) =

Ancient Egyptian official

Khety was a local Ancient Egyptian official who lived at the end of the 12th Dynasty. He is known from his decorated tomb chapel at Asyut where he was perhaps a local governor.

The tomb chapel of Khety (modern numbering M12.3) was once fully painted, but large parts of this decoration are lost today. Several now lost inscriptions are known from copies by Percy Newberry who visited the chapel in the 19th century. Khety was deputy (idnw) and perhaps also mayor (haty-a). With the latter title he was governor at Asyut. The title is somehow problematic as it appears only once in the tomb and was copied by Newberry, while today this inscription is lost. There is a biographical inscription in the tomb chapel that mentions a year 22. This year must relate to the reign of king Amenemhat III under whom Khety was in office.

== Literature ==
- Ilona Regulski: Tomb M12.3 at Asyut, A unique testimony from the 12th Dynasty. Wiedbaden: Harrassowitz, 2024, ISBN 978-3-447-12163-7
