= Teaching for King Merykara =

Middle Egyptian literary work

The Teaching for King Merykara, alt. Instruction Addressed to King Merikare, is a literary composition in Middle Egyptian, the classical phase of the Egyptian language, probably of Middle Kingdom date (2025–1700 BC).

In this sebayt the author has a First Intermediate Period king of Egypt possibly named Kheti address his son, the future king Merykara, advising him on how to be a good king, and how to avoid evil. Merykara is the name of a king of the 9th or 10th Dynasty, the line or lines of kings who ruled northern Egypt during a period of division, the First Intermediate Period (about 2150–2025 BC). Perhaps this allowed the author of this composition greater freedom in describing the limits of royal authority than might have been possible in referring to kings of a unified Egypt; the Teaching for King Merykara is effectively a treatise on kingship in the form of a royal testament, the first of this genre. Similar works were created later in the Hellenistic and Islamic world and, in the speculum regum, had a parallel in medieval Europe. Like similar later "royal testaments" one of its functions may have been the legitimization of the ruling king.

== Synopsis ==
The first, mostly destroyed, section deals with the putting down of rebellion, the second with how to treat the king's subjects. The third section gives advice on how to run the army and religious services. The fourth describes the king's achievements and how to emulate them. Next, in contrast to the continual recycling of architectural blocks, the king is instructed to quarry new stone, not reuse old monuments; the reality of reuse is acknowledged, but the ideal of new work is commended. Similarly, the destruction of a sacred territory at Abydos is recorded; the king expresses remorse, as if accepting responsibility for the unthinkable that must have recurred throughout history – sacrilege in the name of the ruling king, subject to divine retribution during a judgment of the dead. The importance of upholding Maat, the right world order, is stressed. The last two sections contain a hymn to the creator god (who remains unnamed) and an exhortation to heed these instructions.

The contrast between real and ideal make the composition a reflection on power unparalleled in Ancient Egyptian writing.

== Principal sources ==
The text is known from three fragmentary papyri. They only partly complement one another and the most complete one, the Leningrad Papyrus, contains the largest number of scribal errors and omissions, making it very difficult to work with.

- Papyrus Hermitage 1116A, late 18th Dynasty
- Papyrus Moscow, Pushkin Museum of Fine Arts 4658, late 18th Dynasty
- Papyrus Carlsberg 6, late 18th Dynasty

== Bibliography ==
- Translation in R. B. Parkinson, The Tale of Sinuhe and Other Ancient Egyptian Poems. Oxford World's Classics, 1999.
- Stephen Quirke: Egyptian Literature 1800BC: Questions and Readings, London 2004, 112-120 ISBN 0-9547218-6-1 (translation and transcription)
- Miriam Lichtheim, Ancient Egyptian Literature, vol.1. pp. 97–109. University of California Press 1980, ISBN 0-520-02899-6
- Siegfried Morenz, Egyptian Religion, Cornell University Press 1992 ISBN 0-8014-8029-9
- Erik Hornung, Conceptions of God in Ancient Egypt: The One and the Many, Cornell University Press 1996, ISBN 0-8014-8384-0
- R. Hoop, Genesis 49 in Its Literary and Historical Context, Brill 1999, ISBN 90-04-09192-0
- Robert Layton, Who Needs the Past?: Indigenous Values and Archaeology, Routledge 1994, ISBN 0-415-09558-1
