= Tenth Dynasty of Egypt =

Dynasty of ancient Egypt

- c. 2130 BC–c. 2040 BC
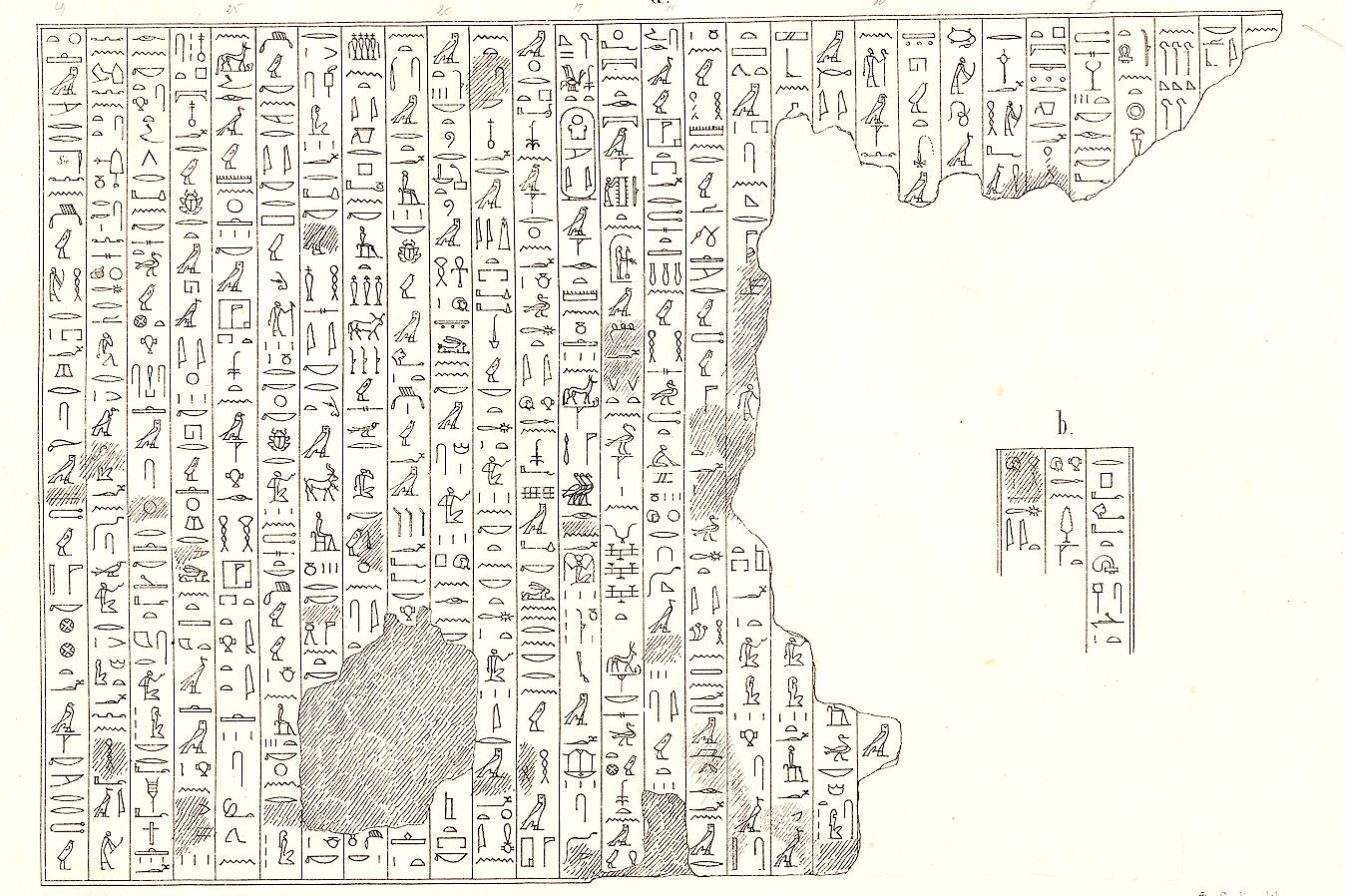
- Inscription on the tomb Khety II, nomarch of Pharaoh Merykare, Mariette
- Capital: Herakleopolis Magna
- Common languages: Egyptian language
- Religion: ancient Egyptian religion
- Government: Absolute monarchy
- Historical era: Bronze Age
  - Established: c. 2130 BC
  - Disestablished: c. 2040 BC
Preceded by	Succeeded by
Eighth Dynasty of Egypt; Ninth Dynasty of Egypt	Eleventh Dynasty of Egypt

The Tenth Dynasty of ancient Egypt (Dynasty X) is often combined with the 7th, 8th, 9th and early 11th Dynasties under the group title First Intermediate Period.

== Rulers ==
The 9th Dynasty was founded at Herakleopolis Magna, and the 10th Dynasty continued there. At this time Egypt was not unified, and there is some overlap between these and other local dynasties. The Turin Canon lists eighteen kings for this royal line, but their names are damaged, unidentifiable, or lost.

The following is a possible list of rulers of the Tenth Dynasty based on the Turin Canon, as Egyptologists have differing opinions about the order of succession within the two dynasties. Among them, only Wahkare Khety and Merykare are undoubtedly attested by archaeological finds:

Tenth Dynasty (according to Hayes) (c. 2130 – 2040 BC)
Name	Image	Comments
Meryhathor(?)		Existence doubtful, known from a damaged graffito at Hatnub
Neferkare VIII		Might be the Kaneferre mentioned in the tomb of the nomarch Ankhtifi
Wahkare Khety III		Possibly the purported author of the Teaching for King Merykare
Merykare		Main opponent of the Theban pharaoh Mentuhotep II
Name lost		An ephemeral ("x months") successor of Merykare

Preceded by Ninth Dynasty	Dynasty of Egypt c. 2130 – c. 2040 BC	Succeeded by Eleventh Dynasty
