= Heracleopolis Magna =

Archaeological site in Egypt

Heracleopolis
- nn nswt (Ancient Egyptian)
- Location within Egypt
- 29°05′08″N 30°56′04″E
- Type: Settlement
- Location: Beni Suef Governorate, Egypt

Heracleopolis Magna (Ancient Greek: Μεγάλη Ἡρακλέους πόλις, Megálē Herakléous pólis), Heracleopolis (Ἡρακλεόπολις, Herakleópolis) or Herakleoupolis (Ἡρακλεούπολις), known in Ancient Egyptian as nn nswt, is the Roman name of the capital of Noret-Khent, the 20th nome of ancient Upper Egypt. The site is located approximately 15 km (9.3 mi) west of the modern city of Beni Suef, in the Beni Suef Governorate of Egypt.

== Name ==
Hwt t pr sw t n Xrd n n t niwt
ḥwt nn nswt
in hieroglyphs

In Ancient Egypt, Heracleopolis Magna was called nn nswt, meaning Child of the King (appearing as hnn nswt or hwt nn nswt; also transcribed Henen-Nesut or Hut-Nen-Nesut). This later developed into Hnes Coptic: Ϩⲛⲏⲥ or ϩⲛⲉⲥ (/ǝhnes/), which was borrowed into early Egyptian Arabic: اهناس Ahnās. The site is now known as Ihnasiyyah Umm al-Kimam "Ihnasiyyah, Mother of the Shards" and as Ihnasiyyah al-Madinah "The City of Ihnasiyyah".

The Greek name meant "City of Heracles", with the epithet "great" being added to distinguish it from other towns with that name. The Greek form became more common during the Ptolemaic Kingdom, which came to power after the death of Alexander the Great. The Roman Empire used a Latinised form of the Greek name.

Some Egyptologists and Biblical scholars connect the biblical city of Hanes (Hebrew: חָנֵס Ḥānês) mentioned in Isaiah 30:4 with Heracleopolis Magna.

== History ==
=== Early Dynastic Period ===
The date of the earliest settlements on the site of Herakleopolis is not known, but an entry on the Palermo Stone reporting king Den's visit to the sacred lake of Heryshef at Nenj-neswt, the ancient name of the city, suggests that it was already in existence by the mid First Dynasty, c. 2970 BC.

=== First Intermediate Period (2181–2055 BC) ===
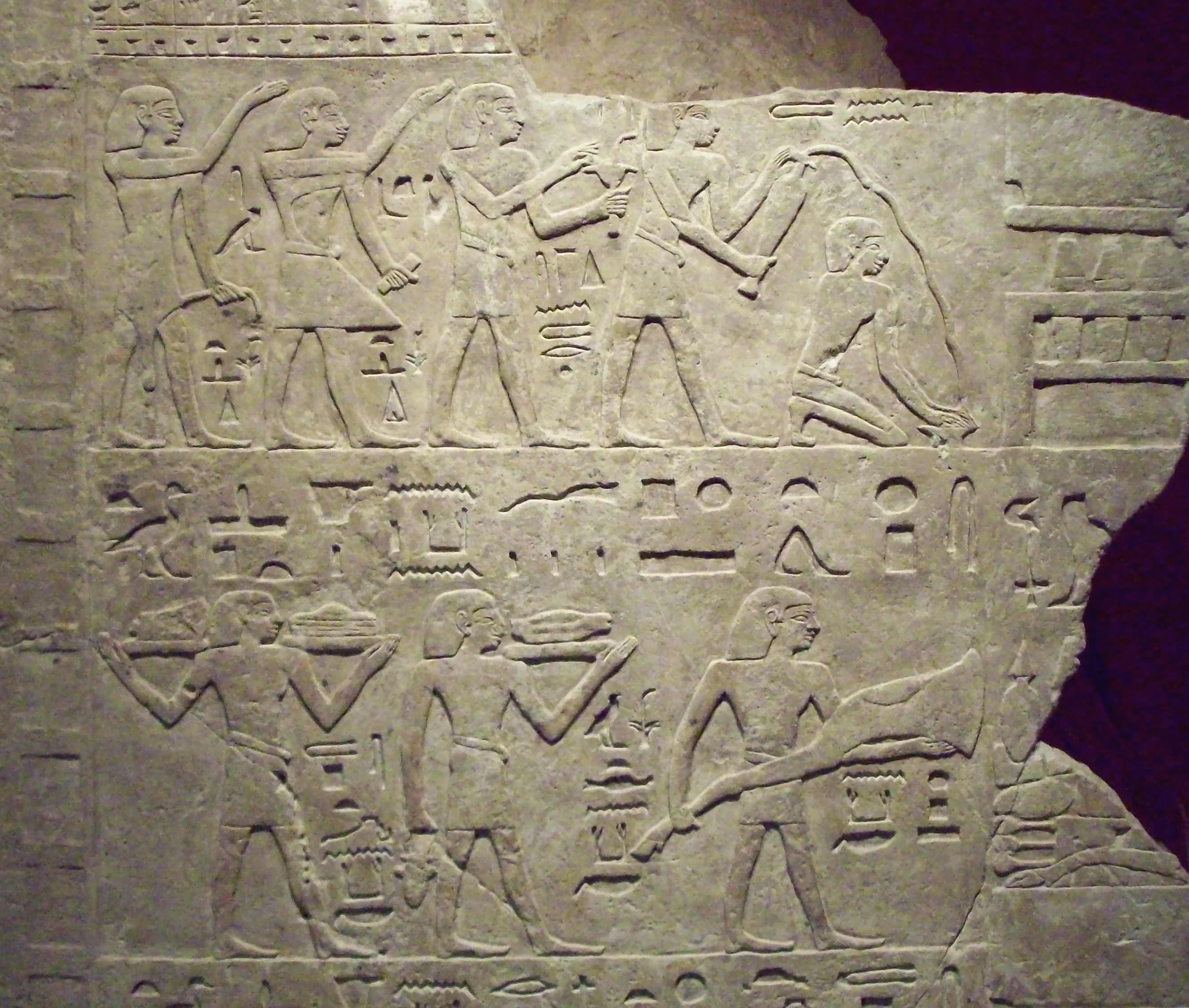
Partial view of the bas-relief from the north wall of a funerary chapel containing the tombs of district governor Neferkhau-(Nfr-khaU) and a woman named Sat-Bahetep (probably his wife)-(Sa-t, Ba-htp), dated between 9th and 11th Dynasties. It shows a funerary food-offering ritual for Sat-Baheteps's ka (between 2160 and 1990 BC).

Herakleopolis first came to prominence and reached its apogee of power during the First Intermediate Period, between 2181 and 2055 BC. Eventually after the collapse of the Old Kingdom, Egypt was divided into Upper and Lower Egypt. Herakleopolis became the principal city of Lower Egypt and was able to exercise its control over much of the region. Herakleopolis exerted such great control over Lower Egypt during this time that Egyptologists and Egyptian archaeologists sometimes refer to the period between the 9th and 10th Dynasties (2160–2025 BC) as the Herakleopolitan Period. During this period, Herakleopolis often found itself in conflict with the de facto capital of Upper Egypt, ancient Thebes.

=== Middle Kingdom (2055–1650 BC) ===
Between the latter part of the First Intermediate Period and the early Middle Kingdom, the city became the religious center of the cult of Heryshaf, and the Temple of Heryshaf was constructed. Heracleopolis Magna and its dynasty was defeated by Mentuhotep II in c. 2055–2004 BC, which ushered in the Middle Kingdom period.

=== New Kingdom (1650–1069 BC) ===
Pharaoh Horemheb is believed to have originally come from Herakleopolis, since his coronation text formally credits the god Horus of Hnes (Herakleopolis) for establishing him on the throne.

=== Third Intermediate Period (1069–664 BC) ===
By the time of the Third Intermediate Period (1069–664 BC), Herakleopolis again rose in importance. There were many renovations and new constructions of the temple and mortuary centers that existed in the city, and it again became an important religious and political center.

=== Ptolemaic Egypt (322–30 BC) ===
By the Ptolemaic Kingdom (332–30 BC), Herakleopolis was still an important religious and cultural center in Egypt. The Greek rulers of this period, in an attempt to find connections and comparisons between their own gods and the gods of the land that they were now ruling, associated Haryshef with Heracles in the interpretatio graeca, thus the name often used by modern scholars for Herakleopolis.

=== Roman Egypt (30 BC–390 AD) ===
The site of Herakleopolis was occupied even into Roman times. Near the Necropolis of Sedmet el-Gebel, houses dating to this period were found, which in and of itself implies a continued occupation of the area.

== Notable people ==
- Theophanes (Θεοφάνης), a Physicist.

== Archaeological excavations ==
=== Sir Flinders Petrie and Edouard Naville ===
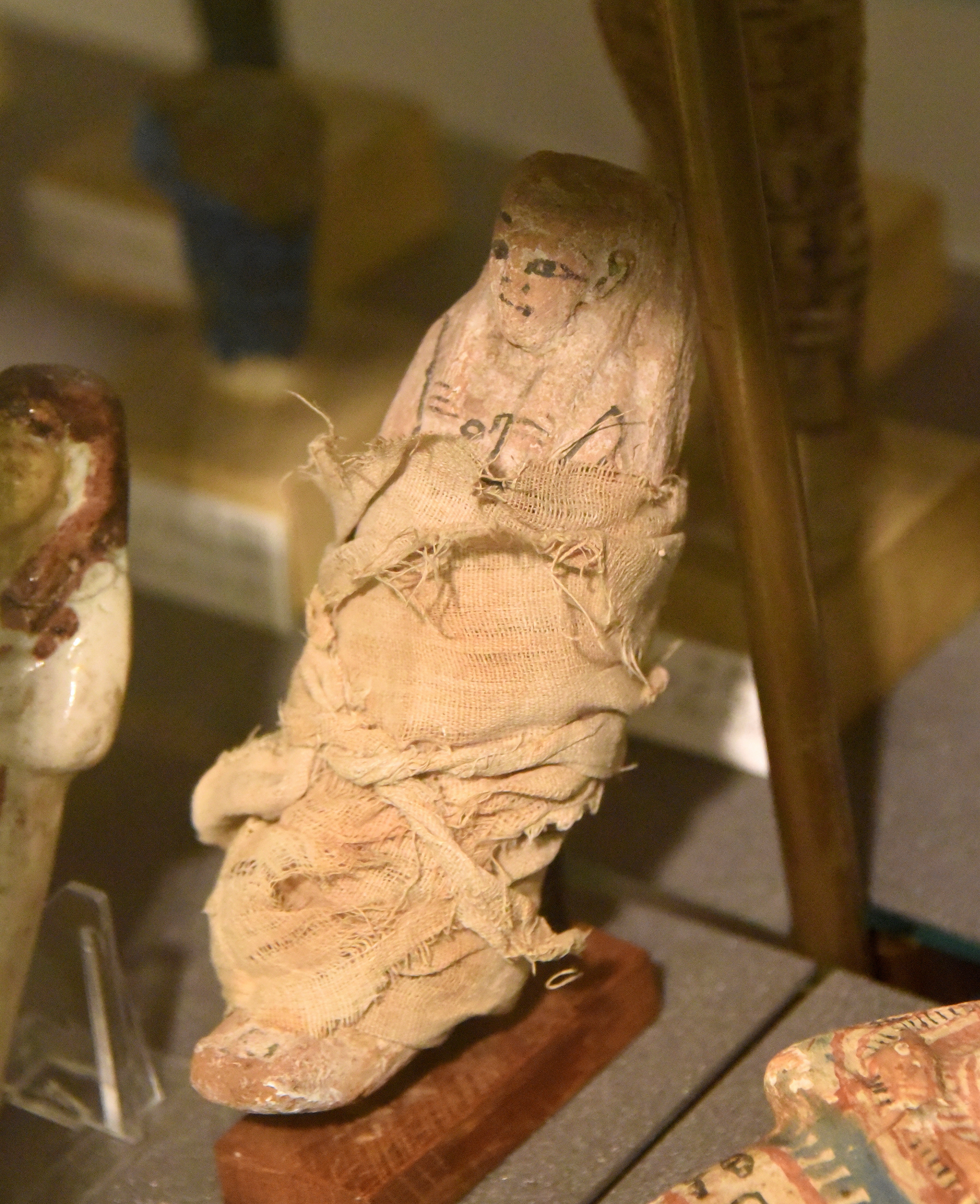
Pottery ushabti from Heracleopolis Magna with linen grave clothes of T3y-ms. 19th Dynasty. (Petrie Museum of Egyptian Archaeology, London)

The first person to undertake an extensive excavation at Herakleopolis was the Swiss Egyptologist Edouard Naville. After excavating what he believed to be the entirety of the Temple of Heryshef, Naville came to the conclusion that he had found all that Herakleopolis had to offer.

His friend Sir Flinders Petrie, on the other hand, “...in 1879 suspected that the region already cleared was only a part of the temple,” and thus Herakleopolis (or Ehnasya as he called it, a name harking back to the site's period of Roman occupation) had much left to be unearthed.

Petrie discovered a great deal that Naville had not believed existed. He completed the excavation of the temple of Heryshef, and attempted to find other remains in an area around the temple. In so doing, he succeeded in discovering such previously unknown features. such as a house's remains from the Roman period of occupation. He also identified another temple that he attributed to the 19th Dynasty, as well as the aforementioned additions to the Temple of Heryshef associated with Ramesses the Great. Other than archaeological features, the artefacts found by Petrie during his excavation are numerous, and span the entire chronological range of settlement. Relating specifically to artefacts found from the end of the First Intermediate Period and the beginning of the Middle Kingdom, Petrie uncovered numerous pot sherds he associated with the 11th Dynasty. From the later Roman periods, Petrie found numerous objects associated with many of the mortuary sites that he unearthed, including iron tools, pottery, and icons.

=== Recent excavations ===
While other excavations are not numerous and are naturally overshadowed by that of Flinders Petrie and his famous expedition, there have been several more recent excavations that have also increased knowledge of the site. During the 1980s, a Spanish team conducted excavations and uncovered such artefacts as a libation altar and a pair of decorated eyes, presumably from a statue, all attributed to a temple dated to the Third Intermediate Period.

A Spanish team also conducted excavations as recently as 2008, under the direction of María del Carmen Pérez-Die of the National Archaeological Museum in Madrid, Spain. Their efforts revealed a previously unknown tomb with several false doors dating to the First Intermediate Period, as well as funeral offerings, all of which had not been vandalized. Other finds include the funeral chapel of senior official Neferjau and his wife Sat-Bahetep, and the remains of tomb H.1 belonging to a late-11th Dynasty officier named Khety.

In May 2026, an Egyptian archaeological mission affiliated with the Supreme Council of Antiquities announced a series of significant discoveries at the ancient site. The discoveries, made during ongoing excavations led by archaeologist Mohamed Ibrahim, Director General of Beni Suef Antiquities, provide new evidence for the city's enduring importance across the Pharaonic, Ptolemaic, Greek, Roman, and early Byzantine periods. The finds include royal inscriptions associated with the pharaoh Senusret III, architectural remains of a Roman basilica and an earlier Doric temple, a rare marble head of Aphrodite, and artifacts connected to Roman-era coin production. These discoveries contribute substantially to scholars' understanding of the city's religious traditions, urban development, and economic activity through successive historical eras.

Among the most important discoveries is a reused limestone block bearing a raised-relief inscription of the royal cartouche of Senusret III, one of the most influential rulers of Egypt's Twelfth Dynasty during the Middle Kingdom (c. 1878–1839 BCE). The inscription preserves both the throne name and the birth name of the pharaoh, providing valuable evidence of his connection to the site. Archaeologists also identified a second cartouche bearing the name of Osiris-Naref (or Osir-Naref), a local manifestation of Osiris who enjoyed particular importance in the city during both the Pharaonic and Ptolemaic periods.

Excavations also revealed previously unknown extensions of a large Roman-period basilica, offering new insight into the architectural development of public and religious buildings in late antiquity. Basilicas originally functioned as civic structures used for administrative, commercial, and judicial activities during the Greek and Roman periods. In later centuries, many were adapted for Christian worship. One of the most remarkable aspects of the discovery is evidence that builders reused architectural components from an earlier Doric temple when constructing the basilica during the sixth century CE. Preliminary studies indicate that massive stone blocks from the temple were reorganized to create foundations capable of supporting enormous columns weighing as much as 45 metric tons. Three of these columns remain standing in their original positions, providing rare testimony to the engineering capabilities of the period and the adaptive reuse of earlier monumental architecture.

Among the most visually striking finds is a finely carved marble head representing Aphrodite, the Greek embodiment of love and beauty. Measuring approximately 24 by 25 centimeters, the sculpture exhibits exceptional artistic quality, with carefully modeled facial features and elaborately rendered curly hair characteristic of classical Greek and Roman artistic traditions.

The excavation team also uncovered fragments of wall statues and a collection of terracotta molds believed to have been used in the production of coins during the Roman era. These artifacts provide important evidence for local manufacturing and commercial activity and suggest that the city remained a thriving economic center long after the end of Pharaonic rule. The coin molds, in particular, offer insight into regional monetary production and trade networks operating within Roman Egypt. Together with the architectural remains and sculptural fragments, they paint a picture of a prosperous urban center integrated into the wider economic system of the Roman Empire.

Preceded by Memphis	Capital of Egypt; 2185 BC – 2060 BC	Succeeded by Thebes
