= Abydos King List (Ramesses II) =

Ancient Egyptian kings list

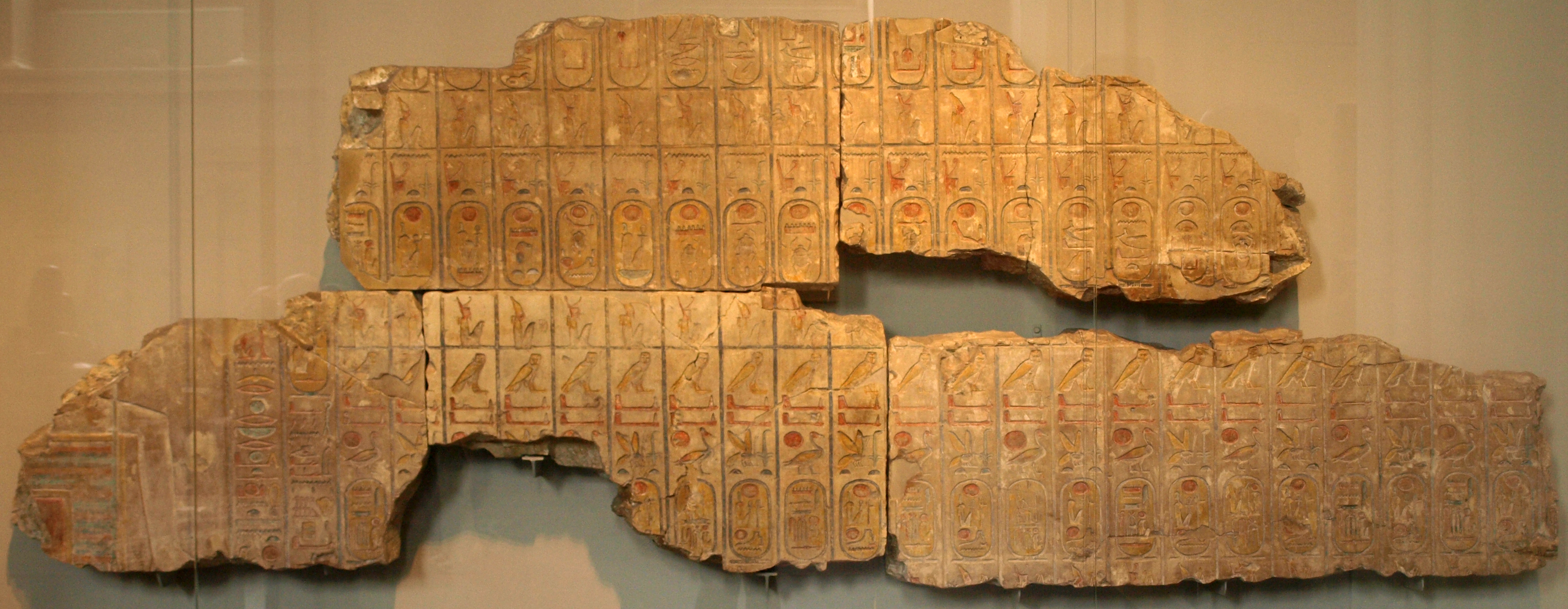
Fragmentary Abydos King's List from the temple of Ramesses II at Abydos, now at the British Museum.

The Abydos King List of Ramesses II, also known as the Fragmentary Abydos King List, the Fragmentary Abydos King Table or the Fragmentary Abydos Tablet, is a list of Ancient Egyptian kings down to Ramesses' own time. Originally located in the temple of Ramesses II at Abydos in Egypt, it was built in the 13th century BC. The list is similar to the one inscribed in the temple built at the site by Ramesses' father and predecessor, Seti I, but with the addition of Ramesses' own throne name and nomen. The list was found by William John Bankes in 1818 and the surviving fragments were removed in 1837 by the French consul in Egypt, dismantled and the blocks sold to the British. Severely damaged as a result, it is now on display at the British Museum.

Ramesses' list is in fragments, so that only some of the kings' names survive. Originally, the list was believed to have consisted of four rows of 26 cartouches (borders enclosing the name of a king) in each row. The upper three rows would have contained names of the kings (76 ancestors plus Ramesses prenomen and nomen for a total of 78), while the fourth would have row merely repeats Ramesses II's prenomen and nomen. The original top row was lost in antiquity, leaving the current 3 rows with 32 cartouches of different pharaohs surviving.

This list omits the names of many earlier pharaohs who were apparently considered illegitimate — those were Sobekneferu, pharaohs of the Ninth Dynasty, pharaohs of the Tenth Dynasty, the Hyksos, pharaohs of the Second Intermediate Period, Hatshepsut, Akhenaten, Smenkhkare, Neferneferuaten, Tutankhamen, and Ay.

== Contents of the king list ==
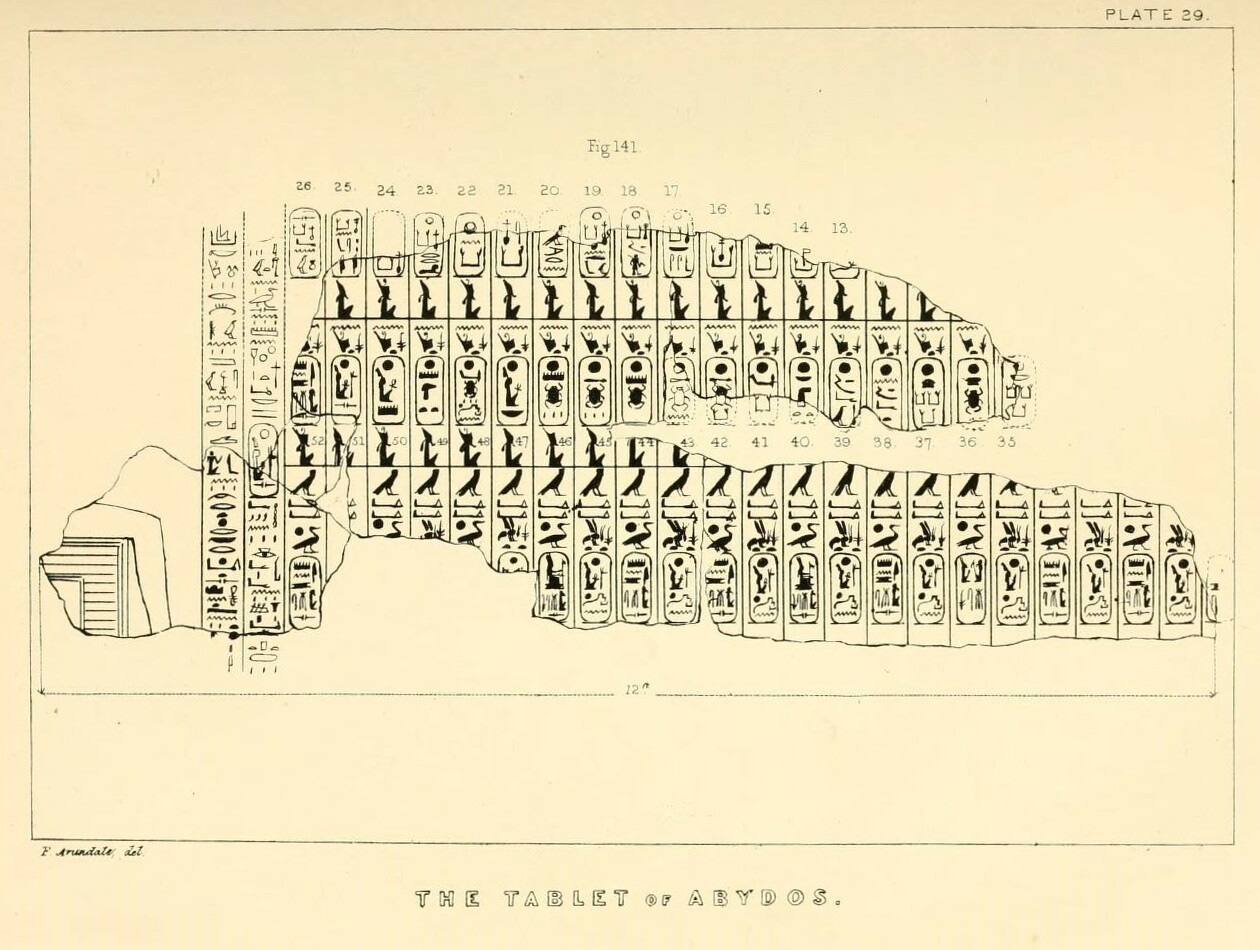
Drawing of the Fragmentary Abydos King List from 1842. Details like hieroglyphics and cartouches that were present in 1826, but had disappeared by 1842 are included here, along with reconstructions of some of the cartouches.

=== Row 1 ===
==== Sixth Dynasty ====
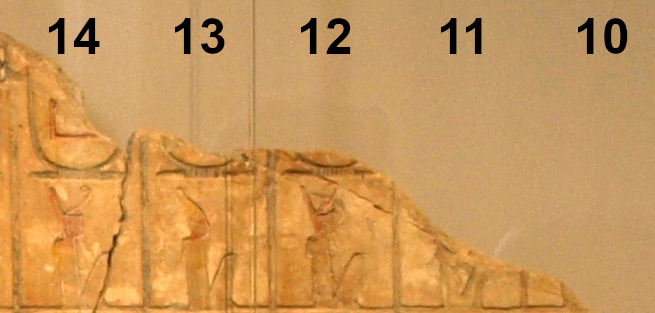
Cartouches 10 to 14 (Click to enlarge)

#	Pharaoh	Name written in the list	Hieroglyphs
1.	Names lost		
2.	Names lost		
3.	Names lost		
4.	Names lost		
5.	Names lost		
6.	Names lost		
7.	Names lost		
8.	Names lost		
9.	Names lost		
10.	Names lost		
11.	Names lost		
12.	Names lost		
13.	Merenre Nemtyemsaf II	(Merenre Saemsaf) (Note: Name is now destroyed, but was recorded before it was lost)	n sw N t < HASH f > A43
14.	Netjerkare Siptah	(Netjer)ka(re)	n sw N t < ra nTr kA > A45

==== Seventh/Eighth Dynasty ====
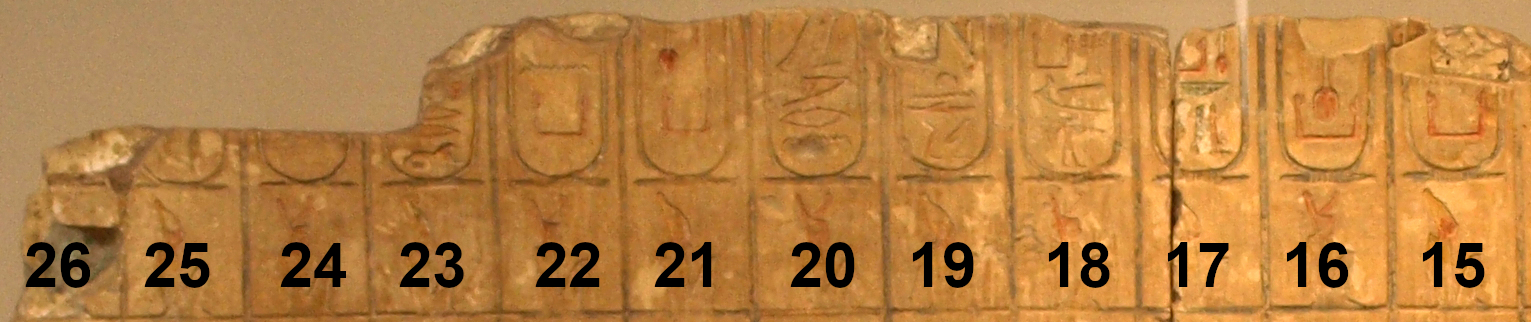
Cartouches 15 to 26 (Click to enlarge)

#	Pharaoh	Name written in the list	Hieroglyphs
15.	Menkare	Men(ka)re	n sw N t < ra mn n kA > A43
16.	Neferkare II	Neferka(re)	n sw N t < ra nfr kA > A45
17.	Neferkare Neby	Neferka(re) Nebseneb	n sw N t < ra nfr kA nb b i i > A43
18.	Djedkare Shemai	Djedka(re) Shemai	n sw N t < ra dd kA U4 mniw > A45 or n sw N t < ra dd kA U4 A24 > A45
19.	Neferkare Khendu	Neferka(re) Khendu	n sw N t < ra nfr kA ra n d w gH > A43
20.	Merenhor	Merenhor	n sw N t < G5 U7 r n > A45
21.	Neferkamin	Sneferka	n sw N t < s nfr kA > A43
22.	Nikare	Nika(re)	n sw N t < ra n kA > A45
23.	Neferkare Tereru	(Neferkare) Tereru	n sw N t < ra nfr kA D21 r rw > A43
24.	Neferkahor	(Neferkahor)	n sw N t < G5 nfr kA > A45
25.	Neferkare Pepiseneb	(Neferkare Pepiseneb)	n sw N t < nfr kA n p p s b i i > A43
26.	Neferkamin Anu	(Sneferka Anu)	n sw N t < s nfr kA a n nw w > A45

=== Row 2 ===
==== Twelfth Dynasty ====
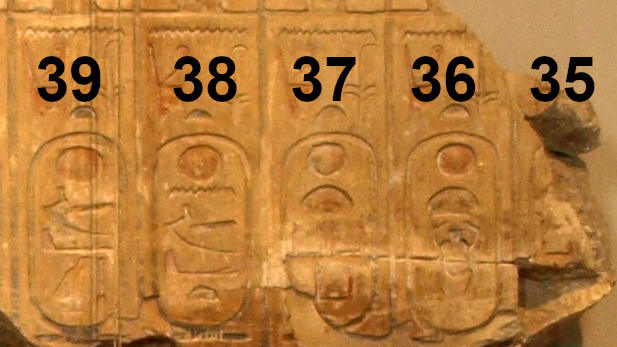
Cartouches 35 to 39 (Click to enlarge)

#	Pharaoh	Name written in the list	Hieroglyphs
27.	Names lost		
28.	Names lost		
29.	Names lost		
30.	Names lost		
31.	Names lost		
32.	Names lost		
33.	Names lost		
34.	Names lost		
35.	Amenemhat II	(Nebukaure)	n sw N t < ra k kA kA kA > A43
36.	Senusret II	Khakheperure	n sw N t < ra xa xpr > A45
37.	Senusret III	Khakaure	n sw N t < ra xa kA kA kA > A43
38.	Amenemhat III	Nimaatre	n sw N t < ra n U5 a t > A45
39.	Amenemhat IV	Maakherure	n sw N t < ra U5 a xrw w > A43

==== Eighteenth Dynasty ====
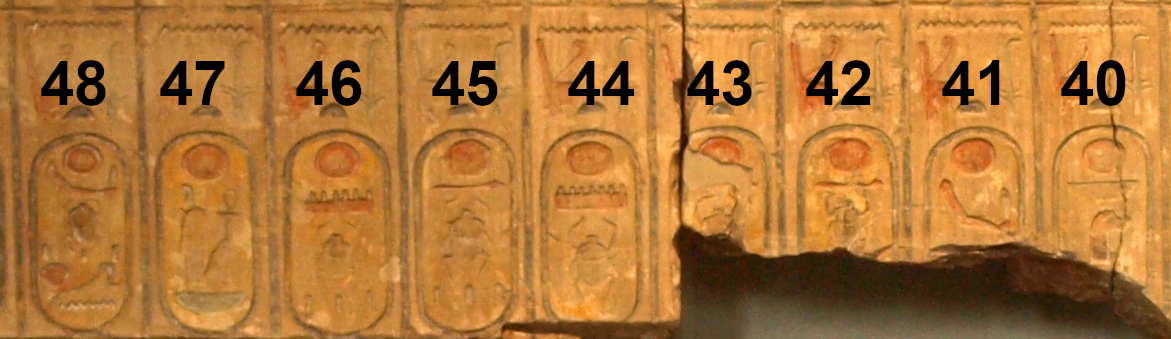
Cartouches 40 to 48 (Click to enlarge)

#	Pharaoh	Name written in the list	Hieroglyphs
40.	Ahmose I	Nebpehtyre	n sw N t < ra nb F9 t t > A45
41.	Amenhotep I	Djeser(ka)re	n sw N t < ra Dsr kA > A43
42.	Thutmose I	Aakheper(ka)re	n sw N t < ra aA xpr kA > A45
43.	Thutmose II	(Aa)kheper(en)re	n sw N t < ra aA xpr n > A45
44.	Thutmose III	Menkheperre	n sw N t < ra mn xpr > A45
45.	Amenhotep II	Aakheperure	n sw N t < ra aA xpr Z2 > A43
46.	Thutmose IV	Menkheperure	n sw N t < ra mn xpr Z2 > A43
47.	Amenhotep III	Nebmaatre	n sw N t < ra mAat nb > A43
48.	Horemheb	Djeserkheperure Setepenre	n sw N t < ra Dsr xpr Z2 stp ra n > A45

==== Nineteenth Dynasty ====
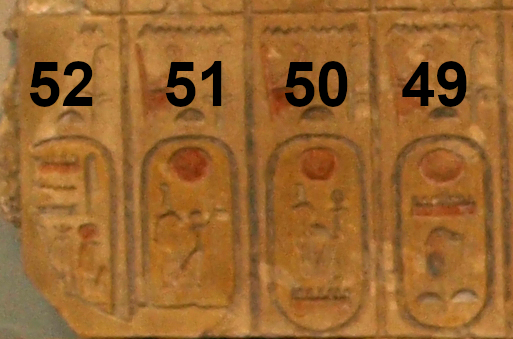
Cartouches 49 to 52 (Click to enlarge)

#	Pharaoh	Name written in the list	Hieroglyphs
49.	Ramesses I	Menpehtire	n sw N t < ra mn F9 t t > A43
50.	Seti I	Menmaatre	n sw N t < ra mAat mn > A45
51.	Ramesses II	Usermaatre	n sw N t < ra wsr mAat z > A43
52.	Ramesses II	Ramess(es) Meryamun	n sw N t < i mn n N36 C2 ms s z > A45

=== Row 3 ===
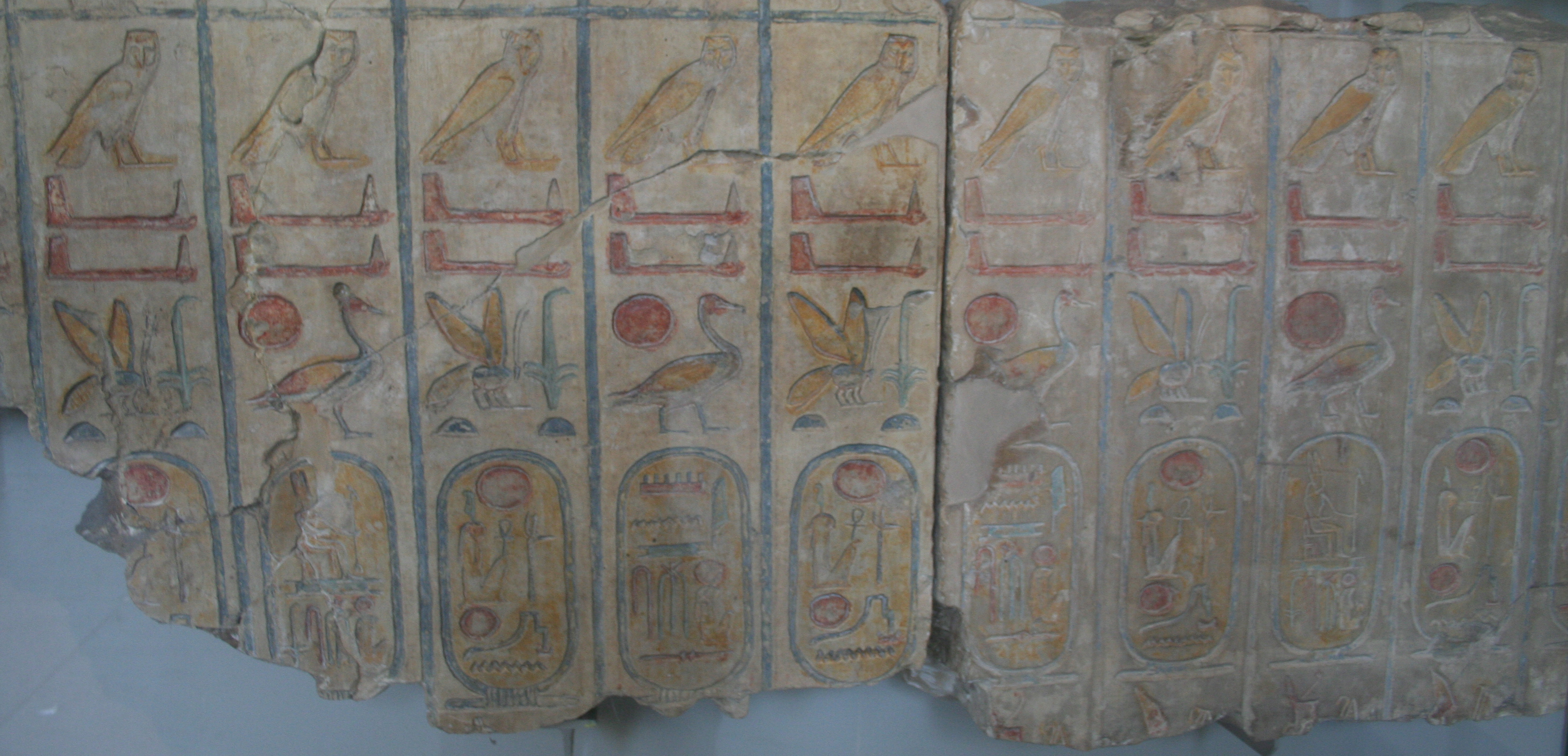
The third row merely contains the Prenomen of Ramesses II repeated 13 times and several different versions of the Nomen of Ramesses II repeated a combined total of 13 times.

Row 3
Name type	Name written in List	Hieroglyphs
Nomen of Ramesses II	Ramesses Meryamun	m D37 D37 zA ra < i mn n N36 C2 ms s z >
Prenomen of Ramesses II	Usermaatre Setepenre	m D37 D37 sw t bit t < ra wsr mAat stp ra n >
Nomen of Ramesses II	Ramesses Meryamun	m D37 D37 zA ra < C12 C2 ms s M22 z >
Nomen of Ramesses II	Ramesses Meryamun	m D37 D37 zA ra < C2 C12 ms s sw >

== See also ==
- Abydos King List (Seti I)
- Manetho King List
- Karnak King List
- Palermo Stone
- Ramesseum king list
- Saqqara Tablet
- Turin King List
- Medinet Habu king list
