= Neferkare =

Neferkare or Nefkara may refer to:

== Pharaohs ==
- Neferkare I, 2nd Dynasty
- Pepi II Neferkare, 6th Dynasty
- Neferkare II, 8th Dynasty
- Neferkare Neby, 8th Dynasty
- Neferkare Khendu, 8th Dynasty
- Neferkare Tereru, 8th Dynasty
- Neferkare Pepiseneb, 8th Dynasty
- Neferkare VII, 9th Dynasty
- Neferkare VIII, 10th Dynasty
- Neferkare Nebiryraw II, 16th Dynasty
- Neferkare Setepenre Ramesses IX, 20th Dynasty
- Neferkare Amenemnisu, 21st Dynasty
- Neferkare Peftjauawybast, king of Herakleopolis Magna during the 25th Dynasty
- Neferkare Shabaka, 25th Dynasty
- Neferkare (Tanis), king of Tanis during the 26th Dynasty

== Other people ==
- Neferkare Iymeru, vizier during the 13th Dynasty
