= Seventh Dynasty of Egypt =

Proposed ancient Egyptian dynasty

- c. 2181 BC
- Capital: Memphis
- Common languages: Egyptian language
- Religion: ancient Egyptian religion
- Government: Absolute monarchy
- Historical era: Bronze Age
  - Established: c. 2181 BC
Preceded by
Sixth Dynasty of Egypt
Succeeded by
Eighth Dynasty of Egypt
Ninth Dynasty of Egypt
Tenth Dynasty of Egypt

The Seventh Dynasty of Egypt would mark the beginning of the First Intermediate Period in the early 22nd century BC but its actual existence is debated. The only historical account on the Seventh Dynasty was in Manetho's Aegyptiaca, a history of Egypt written in the 3rd century BC, where the Seventh Dynasty appears essentially as a metaphor for chaos. Since next to nothing is known of this dynasty beyond Manetho's account, Egyptologists such as Jürgen von Beckerath and Toby Wilkinson have usually considered it to be fictitious. In a 2015 re-appraisal of the fall of the Old Kingdom, the Egyptologist Hratch Papazian has proposed that the Seventh Dynasty was real and that it consisted of kings usually attributed to the Eighth Dynasty.

== Metaphorical interpretation of Historical sources ==
Based on the now lost writings of Africanus (c. 160–240) and Eusebius (c. 260–340), themselves based on the now lost work of the Egyptian priest Manetho (3rd century BC), the Byzantine scholar George Syncellus (died after 810) variously assigns to the period after the Sixth dynasty – the Seventh Dynasty – 70 kings in 70 days (Africanus) or 5 kings in 75 days (Eusebius). According to Manetho, these kings would have ruled in Memphis. Rather than a historical reality, this rapid succession of kings has long been interpreted as a metaphor for chaos.

== Existence claim ==
Some Egyptologists, such as Papazian (2015), believe that this interpretation may give undue weight to Manetho's writings, and that it distorts the general scholarly understanding of the end of the Old Kingdom. According to Papazian (2015), "a re-examination ... of the Seventh Dynasty's existence, remains fully justified" and some of the kings usually attributed to the mid-Eighth Dynasty should instead be understood to belong to the Seventh Dynasty. Being attested by two additional ancient historical sources as well as archeological evidence, the Eighth Dynasty is not quite as obscure as the Seventh. As a consequence, some Egyptologists combine the Seventh and Eighth Dynasty into a single line of kings, reigning immediately after the Sixth Dynasty.

== List of rulers ==
The Seventh Dynasty is usually considered fictitious and is thus either ignored altogether by modern scholars or it is combined with the Eighth Dynasty. The Egyptologist Hratch Papazian has proposed in 2015 that a number of rulers usually seen as belonging to the mid-Eighth Dynasty identified by the Abydos King List should be attributed to a Seventh Dynasty:

Dynasty VII as per Papazian
Name	Evidence beyond the Abydos king list
Djedkare Shemai	—
Neferkare Khendu	—
Merenhor	—
Neferkamin	—
Nikare	Possibly attested by a cylinder seal.
Neferkare Tereru	—
Neferkahor	Attested by a cylinder seal.
Neferkare Pepiseneb	Turin Canon gives at least one year.
Neferkamin Anu	—

Preceded by Sixth Dynasty	Dynasty of Egypt c. 2181 BC	Succeeded by Eighth Dynasty
