= Neferkare VII =

Egyptian pharaoh

- Neferkare VII, Kaneferre(?)

Pharaoh
- Reign: c. 2140 BC
- Successor: Khety II
Royal titulary
Prenomen
Neferkare
nfr-k3-rˁ
Beautiful is the ka of Ra

M23 X1 L2 X1	N5 F35 D28 Z1 G7
- Dynasty: 9th Dynasty

Neferkare VII (fl. c. 2140 BC) was the third king of the Ninth Dynasty of ancient Egypt during the First Intermediate Period, according to the Turin King List where his name, Neferkare, is inscribed in the register 4.20.

Neferkare is not included on the Abydos King List or the Saqqara King List, nor can the existence of his reign be positively confirmed through archaeological finds.

The prenomen "Neferkare" suggests he considered himself a legitimate successor of Pepi II Neferkare of the Sixth Dynasty, much like the many namesake Memphite kings of the Eighth Dynasty. In some literature he is called "Neferkare VII" because he likely was the seventh king to bear this name, although many of his predecessors are now called by a combination of their prenomen and nomen (for example, Neferkare Neby, or Neferkare Pepiseneb).

This otherwise unattested ruler of Herakleopolis Magna has been controversially identified by various scholars with a king named Ka-nefer-re, who is mentioned in an obscure and isolated tomb inscription of Ankhtifi, the pro-Herakleopolite nomarch of Hieraconpolis and prince of El-Mo'alla, about 30 km (19 mi) south of Thebes.
If Neferkare and Kaneferre were the same king, his authority is sometimes presumed from Ankhtifi's inscription to have extended at least over Elephantine, Edfu and Hieraconpolis, the capitals of the first three nomoi of Upper Egypt. However, the inscription in question simply states "Horus brings/brought (or may Horus bring) a (good) inundation for his son Ka-nefer-Re." Uncertainty about the verb tense in the inscription has led to disagreement among various scholars as to whether this named king would have ruled in Ankhtifi's youth, or at the time of the events he describes, or indeed if it were not a king before Ankhtifi's time, who had ruled toward the end of the Old Kingdom from Memphis.

Neferkare’s name appears in the "Abydos King List," a chronological list of kings compiled during the New Kingdom.
