= Neferka =

Ancient Egyptian pharaoh; reigned around 2200 BC

Pharaoh
- Reign: c. 2200 BC
Royal titulary
Prenomen
Turin Canon
Neferka
Nfr-k3
My Ka is perfect
< F35 D28 Z1 > G7
- Father: Possibly Pepi II
- Dynasty: 6th Dynasty

Neferka (fl. c. 2200 BC) may have been an ancient Egyptian king of the Sixth Dynasty.

A king with the name Neferka, written in the papyrus as Neferka-khered appears in the Turin King List between king Netjerkare Siptah and a king Nefer. Neferka and Nefer are most likely writing errors in the papyrus. Several scholars regard Neferka as mistake for "Neferkare" and identify him with Neferkare Pepiseneb. Other identify him with Menkare.
