= Memphite dynasty =

Memphite dynasty may refer to:

- In the Old Kingdom of Egypt
  - Third Dynasty of Egypt (2686 – 2613 BC)
  - Fourth Dynasty of Egypt (2613 – 2498 BC)
  - Fifth Dynasty of Egypt (2498 – 2345 BC)
  - Sixth Dynasty of Egypt (2345 – 2181 BC)
- In the First Intermediate Period of Egypt
  - Seventh Dynasty of Egypt (2181 – 2160 BC)
  - Eighth Dynasty of Egypt (2181 – 2160 BC)
