= Abydos King List =

Ancient Egyptian king list from the 19th dynasty

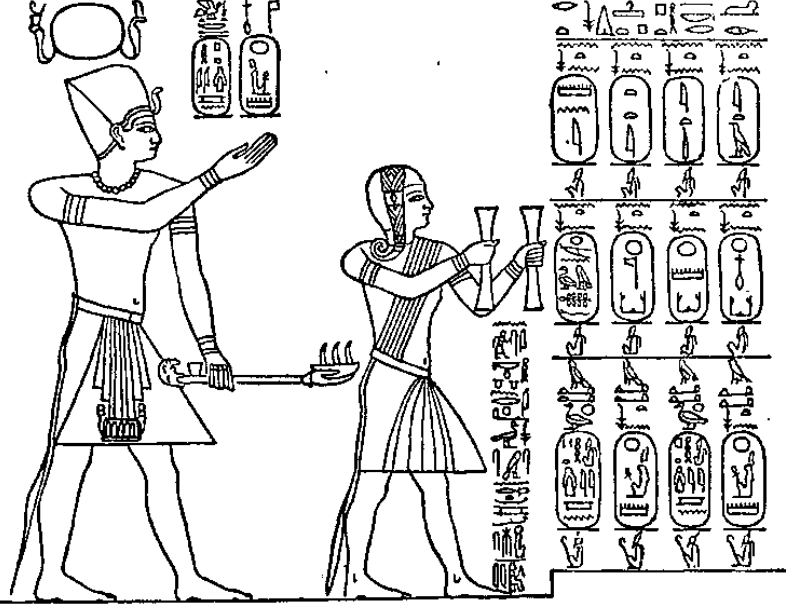
The start of the king list, showing Seti I and his son Ramesses II on the way to making an offering to Ptah-Seker-Osiris, on behalf of their 75 ancestors: the contents of the king list. Seti is wearing the Khepresh. Ramesses is depicted as a prince sporting the Sidelock of youth and holding censers.

The Abydos King List, also known as the Abydos Table or the Abydos Tablet, is a list of the names of 76 kings of ancient Egypt, found on a wall of the Temple of Seti I at Abydos, Egypt. It consists of three rows of 38 cartouches (borders enclosing the name of a king) in each row. The upper two rows contain names of the kings, while the third row merely repeats Seti I's throne name and nomen.

For unknown reasons, the first sign of Djoser's cartouche was deliberately removed later on.

Besides providing the order of the Old Kingdom kings, it is the sole source to date of the names of many of the kings of the Seventh and Eighth Dynasties, so the list is valued greatly for that reason.

This list omits the names of many earlier pharaohs. The bulk of these appear to have been left out because although they claimed royal titles and rule over all Egypt, their actual authority was limited to only part of the country. This category includes all the rulers of the Ninth and Tenth Dynasties, the early rulers of the Eleventh Dynasty (Mentuhotep I, Intef I, Intef II, and Intef III), all the rulers of the Thirteenth Dynasty, and all of the rulers of Second Intermediate Period (including the Hyksos Fifteenth Dynasty, who may also have been seen as illegitimate because they were not native Egyptian). The rulers of the chaotic Amarna Period (Akhenaten, Smenkhkare, Neferneferuaten, Tutankhamun, and Ay), seem to have been removed for reasons of political propaganda or as a form of damnatio memoriae; their reigns were within living memory in Seti's day, and the repudiation of the Amarna Period had been state policy since the reign of Horemheb (who had chosen Seti's father Ramesses I to succeed him). Two pharaohs known to have been women, Sobekneferu and Hatshepsut, are also excluded, most likely due to their gender. Finally, Mentuhotep IV may have been excluded for political reasons (having possibly been overthrown by his vizer and successor Amenemhat I) or simply because his short and poorly documented reign was unknown to Seti and his scribes.

== Contents of the king list ==
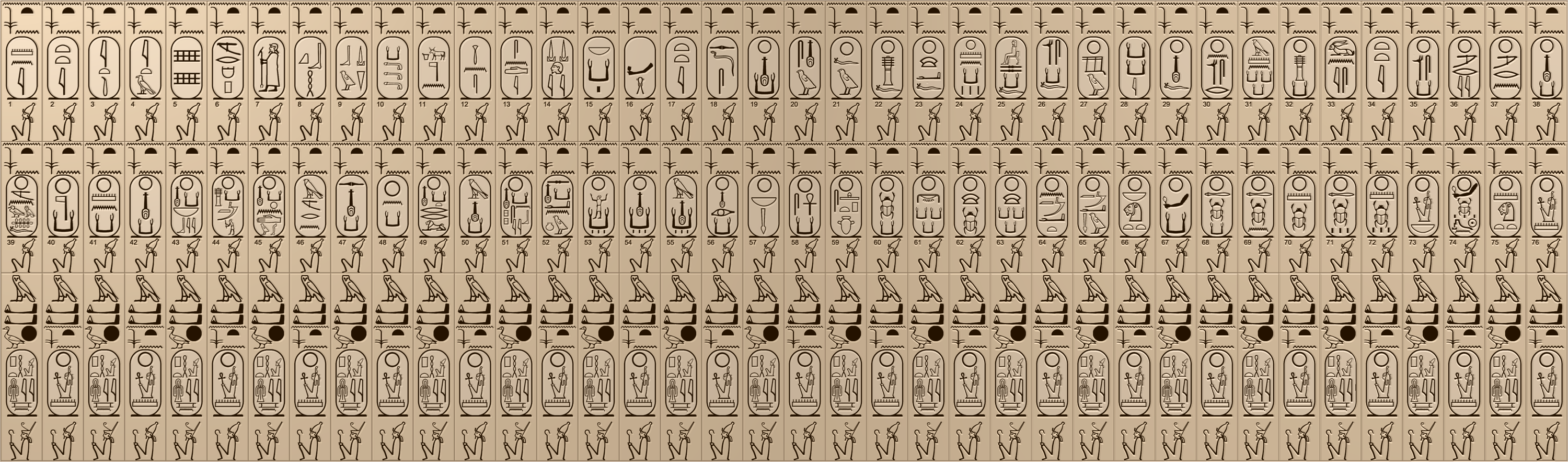
Drawing of the cartouches in the Abydos King List.

=== Row 1 ===
==== First Dynasty ====
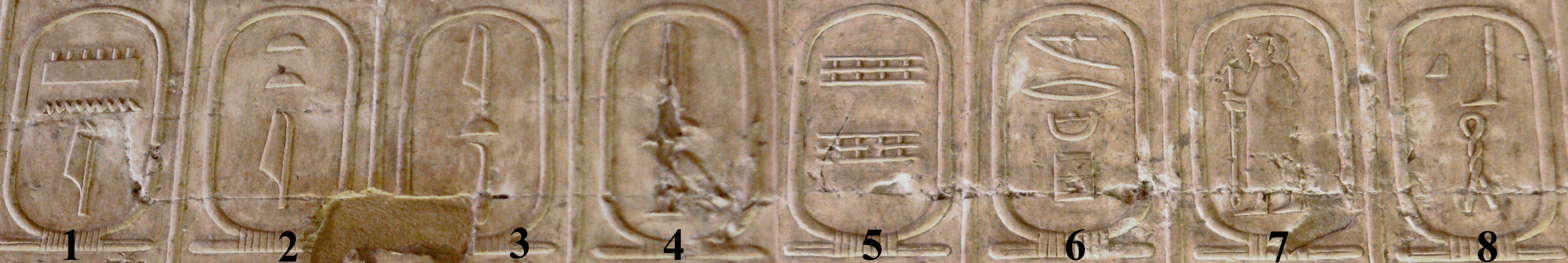
Cartouches 1 to 8 (Click to enlarge)

#	Pharaoh	Name written in List	Name In other Lists	Hieroglyphs
1.	Menes	Meni	Same name in Turin King List. Probably identical to Narmer.	n sw t n < mn n i > A43
2.	Hor-Aha	Teti	Same name in Turin King List.	n sw t n < t t i > A43
3.	Djer	Iti	Same name in Turin King List.	n sw t n < i t ti > A43
4.	Djet	Ita	Itui in Turin King List.	n sw t n < i t A > A43
5.	Den	Septi	Qenti in Turin King List.	n sw t n < spAt spAt > A43
6.	Anedjib	Meribiap	Merbiapen in the Turin King List and Saqqara King List.	n sw t n < U7 r N42 p > A43
7.	Semerkhet	Semsu	Semsem in Turin King List Name absent in Saqqara King List.	n sw t n < A21A > A43
8.	Qa'a	Qebeh	Same name in Turin King List. Qebehu in Saqqara King List.	n sw t n < q b H > A43

==== Second Dynasty ====
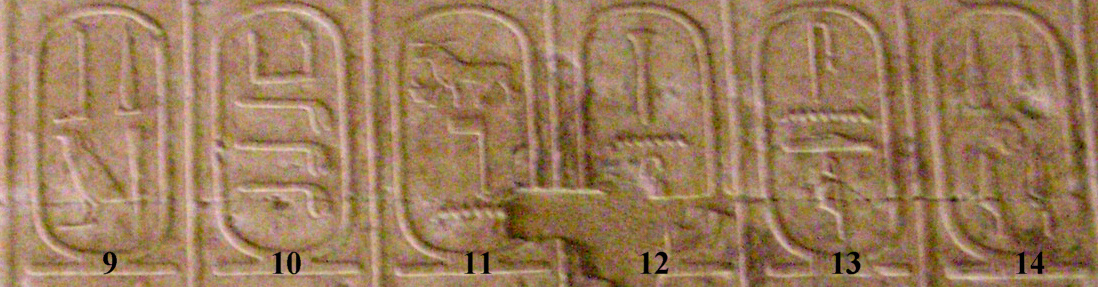
Cartouches 9 to 14 (Click to enlarge)

#	Pharaoh	Name written in List	Name In other Lists	Hieroglyphs
9.	Hotepsekhemwy	Bedjau	Baunetjer in Turin King List and Saqqara King List.	n sw t n < b DA w P11 > A43
10.	Nebra	Kakau	Same name in Turin King List and Saqqara King List.	n sw t n < kA mt mt mt > A43
11.	Nynetjer	Banetjer	Same name in Turin King List. Banetjeru in Saqqara King List.	n sw t n < W10A E1 nTr n > A43
12.	Weneg	Wadjnas	Wadjlas in Saqqara King List. Name damaged in Turin King List.	n sw t n < wAD n s > A43
13.	Senedj	Sendi	Senedj in Turin King List and Saqqara King List.	n sw t n < s n d i > A43
14.	Khasekhemwy	Djadjay	Bebti in Turin King List and Saqqara King List.	n sw t n < DA DA tp i i > A43

==== Third Dynasty ====
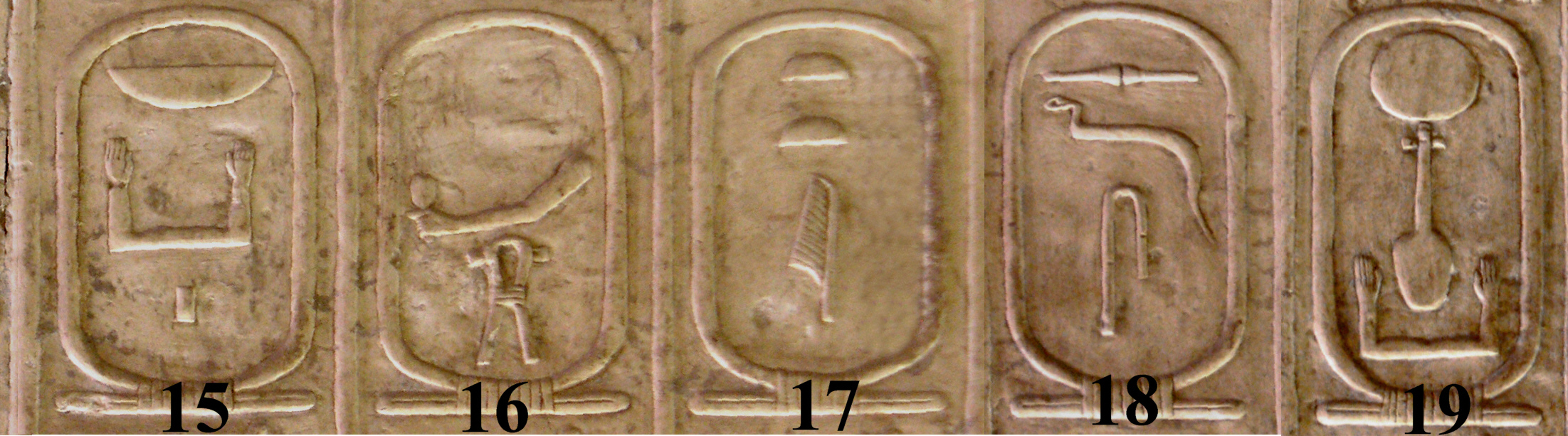
Cartouches 15 to 19 (Click to enlarge)

#	Pharaoh	Name written in List	Name In other Lists	Hieroglyphs
15.	Nebka	Nebka	Same name in Turin King List. Nebkara in Saqqara King List.	n sw t n < nb kA Z1 > A43
16.	Djoser	…Djeser-za	Djoser-it in Turin King List. Djoser in Saqqara King List.	n sw t n < HASH Dsr V17 > A43
17.	Sekhemkhet	Teti	Djoser-ti in Turin King List. Djoser-teti in Saqqara King List.	n sw t n < t t i > A43
18.	Khaba	Sedjes	Hudjefa in Turin King List and Saqqara King List.	n sw t n < z D s > A43
19.	Huni	Neferkare	Huni in Turin King List and Saqqara King List.	n sw t n < ra nfr kA > A43

==== Fourth Dynasty ====
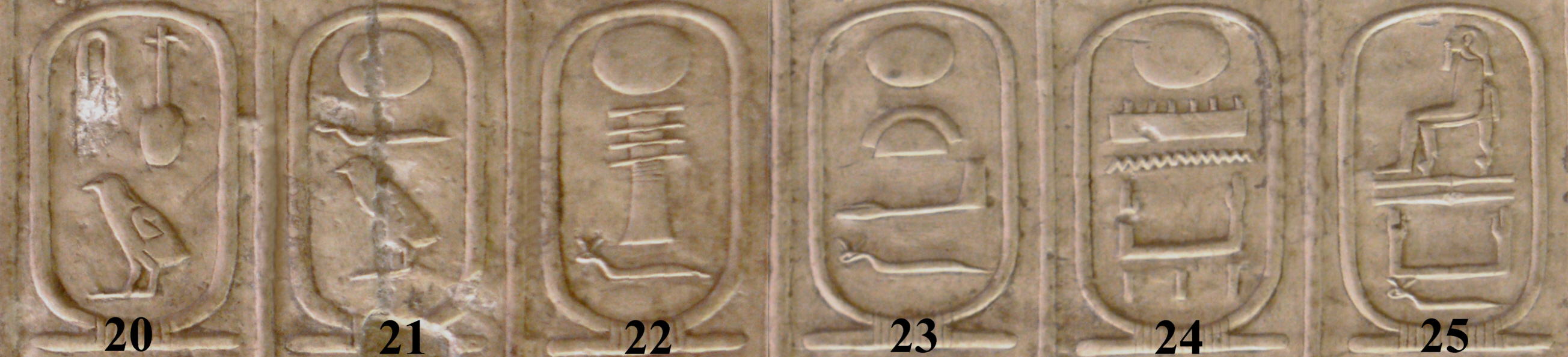
Cartouches 20 to 25 (Click to enlarge)

#	Pharaoh	Name written in List	Name In other Lists	Hieroglyphs
20.	Sneferu	Sneferu	Same name in Saqqara King List. Senefer in Turin King List.	n sw t n < s nfr w > A43
21.	Khufu	Khufu	Same name in Saqqara King List. Name missing in Turin King List.	n sw t n < x f w > A43
22.	Djedefre	Djedefre	Same name in Saqqara King List. Name missing in Turin King List.	n sw t n < ra dd f > A43
23.	Khafre	Khafre	Same name in Saqqara King List. Name damaged in Turin King List	n sw t n < ra xa a f > A43
24.	Menkaure	Menkaure	Name missing in Turin King List and Saqqara King List.	n sw t n < ra mn n kA Z2 > A43
25.	Shepseskaf	Shepseskaf	Name missing in Turin King List and Saqqara King List.	n sw t n < Sps z z kA f > A43

==== Fifth Dynasty ====
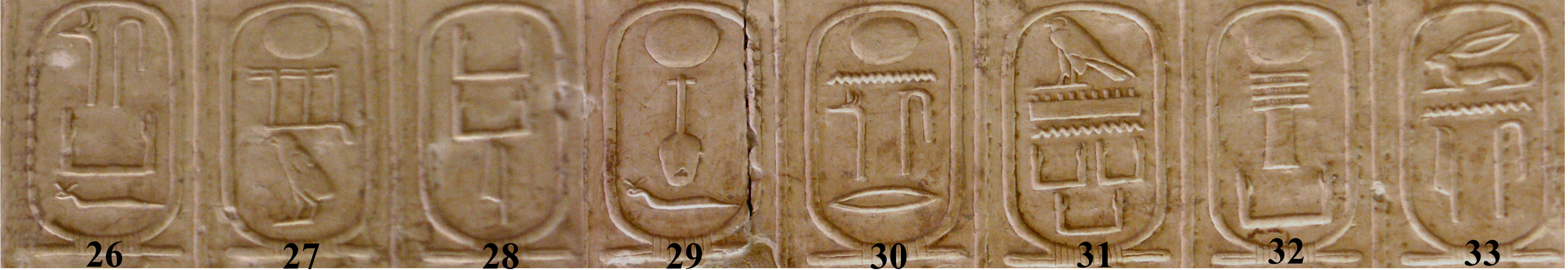
Cartouches 26 to 33 (Click to enlarge)

#	Pharaoh	Name written in List	Name In other Lists	Hieroglyphs
26.	Userkaf	Userkaf	Same name in Saqqara King List. Name damaged in Turin king list.	n sw t n < wsr s kA f > A43
27.	Sahure	Sahure	Same name in Saqqara King List. Name missing in Turin King List.	n sw t n < ra sAH w > A43
28.	Neferirkare Kakai	Kakai	Neferirkare in Saqqara King List. Name missing in Turin King List.	n sw t n < kA kA i > A43
29.	Neferefre	Neferefre	Same name in Saqqara King List. Name missing in Turin King List.	n sw t n < ra nfr f > A43
30.	Nyuserre Ini	Nyuserre	Name missing in Turin King List. Name absent in Saqqara King List.	n sw t n < ra n wsr s r > A43
31.	Menkauhor Kaiu	Menkauhor	Same name in Turin King List and Saqqara King List.	n sw t n < G5 mn n kA kA kA > A43
32.	Djedkare Isesi	Djedkare	Djed in Turin King List. Maatkare in Saqqara King List.	n sw t n < ra dd kA > A43
33.	Unas	Unis	Same name in Turin King List and Saqqara King List.	n sw t n < wn n i s > A43

==== Sixth Dynasty ====
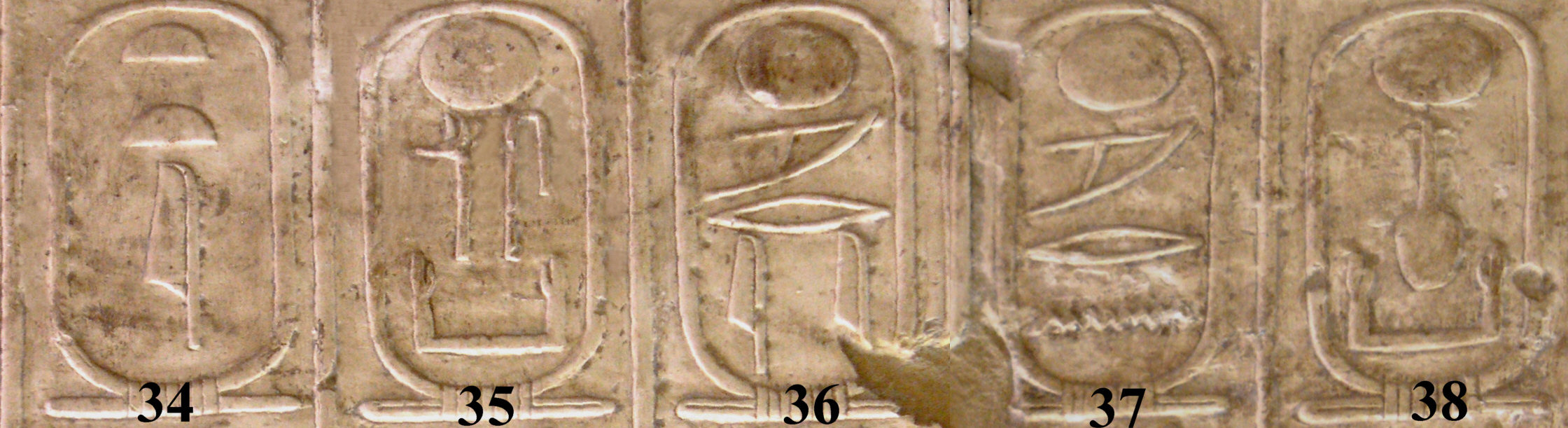
Cartouches 34 to 38 (Click to enlarge)

#	Pharaoh	Name written in List	Name In other Lists	Hieroglyphs
34.	Teti	Teti	Same name in Saqqara King List. Name missing in Turin King List.	n sw t n < t t i > A43
35.	Userkare	Userkare	Name missing in Turin King List. Name absent in Saqqara King List.	n sw t n < ra wsr s kA > A43
36.	Pepi I Meryre	Meryre	Pepi in Saqqara King List. Name missing in Turin King List.	n sw t n < ra U7 r i i > A43
37.	Merenre Nemtyemsaf I	Merenre	Same name in Saqqara King List. Name missing in Turin King List.	n sw t n < ra U7 r n > A43
38.	Pepi II Neferkare	Neferkare	Same name in Saqqara King List. Name missing in Turin King List.	n sw t n < ra nfr kA > A43

=== Row 2 ===
==== Sixth Dynasty (continued) ====
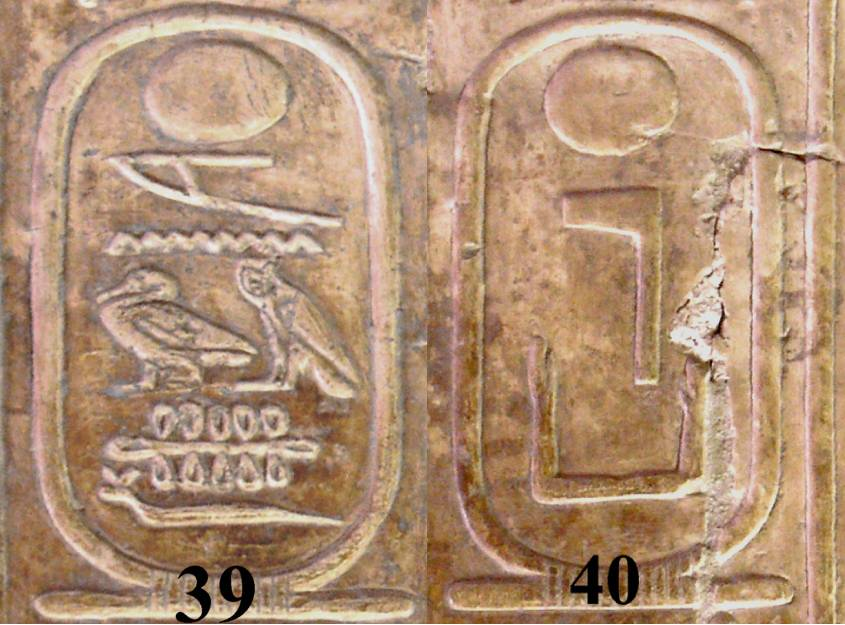
Cartouches 39 and 40 (Click to enlarge)

#	Pharaoh	Name written in List	Name In other Lists	Hieroglyphs
39.	Merenre Nemtyemsaf II	Merenre Saemsaf	Name missing in Turin King List.	n sw t n < ra U7 n wSA m V16 f > A43
40.	Netjerkare Siptah	Netjerikare	Neitiqerty in Turin King List.	n sw t n < ra nTr kA > A43

==== Seventh/Eighth Dynasty ====
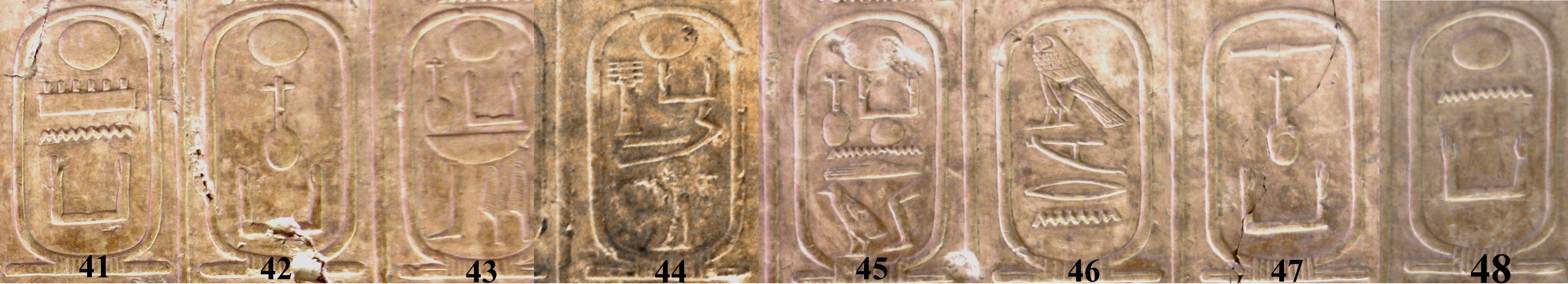
Cartouches 41 to 48 (Click to enlarge)

#	Pharaoh	Name written in List	Name In other Lists	Hieroglyphs
41.	Menkare	Menkare	Name missing in Turin King List.	n sw t n < ra mn n kA > A43
42.	Neferkare II	Neferkare	Name missing in Turin King List.	n sw t n < ra nfr kA > A43
43.	Neferkare Neby	Neferkare Neby	Name missing in Turin King List.	n sw t n < ra nfr kA nb b i i > A43
44.	Djedkare Shemai	Djedkare Shemai	Name missing in Turin King List.	n sw t n < ra dd kA U4 A33 > A43 or n sw t n < ra dd kA U4 A24 > A43
45.	Neferkare Khendu	Neferkare Khendu	Name missing in Turin King List.	n sw t n < ra nfr kA x n d w gH > A43
46.	Merenhor	Merenhor	Name missing in Turin King List.	n sw t n < G5 U7 r n > A43
47.	Neferkamin	Sneferka	Name missing in Turin King List.	n sw t n < z nfr kA > A43
48.	Nikare	Nikare	Name missing in Turin King List.	n sw t n < ra n kA > A43

==== Seventh/Eighth Dynasty (continued) ====
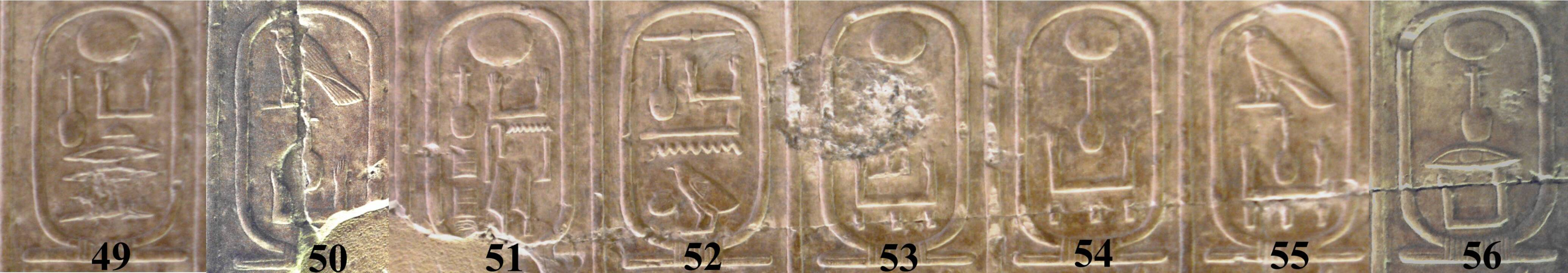
Cartouches 49 to 56 (Click to enlarge)

#	Pharaoh	Name written in List	Name In other Lists	Hieroglyphs
49.	Neferkare Tereru	Neferkare Tereru	Name missing in Turin King List.	n sw t n < ra nfr kA X1 r D21 rw > A43
50.	Neferkahor	Neferkahor	Name missing in Turin King List.	n sw t n < G5 nfr kA > A43
51.	Neferkare Pepiseneb	Neferkare Pepiseneb	Neferka-khered in Turin King List.	n sw t n < ra nfr kA p p s n D58s i i > A43
52.	Neferkamin Anu	Sneferka Anu	Nefer in Turin King List.	n sw t n < z nfr kA a n nw w > A43
53.	Qakare Ibi	Kaukare	Ibi in Turin King List.	n sw t n < ra A28 kA Z2 > A43
54.	Neferkaure	Neferkaure	Neferkare in Turin King List.	n sw t n < ra nfr kA Z2 > A43
55.	Neferkauhor	Neferkauhor	Name missing in Turin King List.	n sw t n < G5 nfr kA Z2 > A43
56.	Neferirkare	Neferirkare	Name missing in Turin King List.	n sw t n < ra nfr ir kA > A43

==== Eleventh Dynasty ====
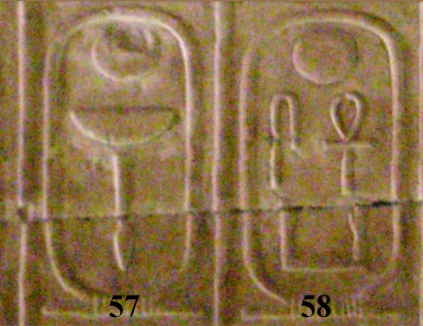
Cartouches 57 and 58 (Click to enlarge)

#	Pharaoh	Name written in List	Name In other Lists	Hieroglyphs
57.	Mentuhotep II	Nebhepetre	Same name in Turin King List and in Saqqara King List.	n sw t n < ra nb xrw > A43
58.	Mentuhotep III	Sankhkare	Seankhkare in Turin King List and in Saqqara King List.	n sw t n < ra s anx kA > A43

==== Twelfth Dynasty ====
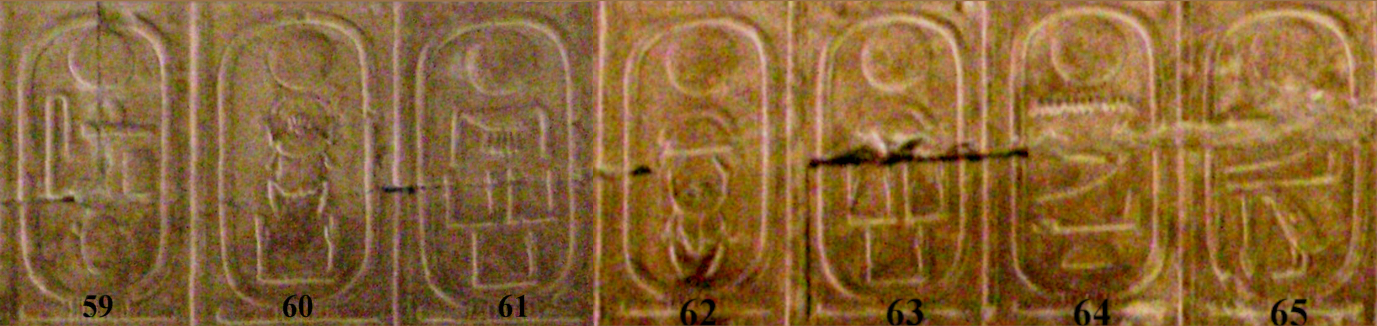
Cartouches 59 to 65 (Click to enlarge)

#	Pharaoh	Name written in List	Name In other Lists	Hieroglyphs
59.	Amenemhat I	Sehetepibre	Same name in Saqqara King List. Name damaged in Turin King List.	n sw t n < ra s Htp t p ib > A43
60.	Senusret I	Kheperkare	Same name in Saqqara King List. Name damaged in Turin King List.	n sw t n < ra xpr kA > A43
61.	Amenemhat II	Nubkaure	Same name in Saqqara King List. Name missing in Turin King List.	n sw t n < ra nbw kA kA kA > A43
62.	Senusret II	Khakheperre	Same name in Saqqara King List. Name missing in Turin King List.	n sw t n < ra xa xpr > A43
63.	Senusret III	Khakaure	Same name in Saqqara King List. Name missing in Turin King List.	n sw t n < ra xa kA kA kA > A43
64.	Amenemhat III	Nimaatre	Same name in Saqqara King List. Name missing in Turin King List.	n sw t n < ra n U4 a t > A43
65.	Amenemhat IV	Maakherure	Same name in Turin King List and in Saqqara King List.	n sw t n < ra U5 a xrw w > A43

==== Eighteenth Dynasty ====
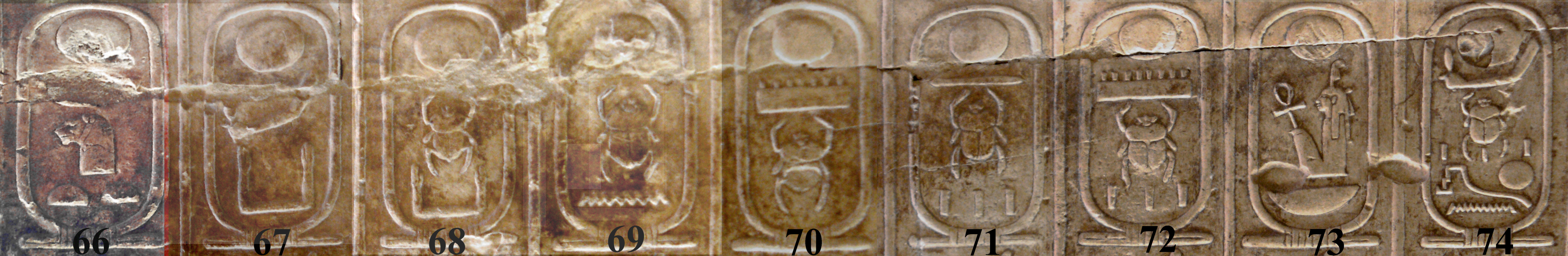
Cartouches 66 to 74 (Click to enlarge)

#	Pharaoh	Name written in List	Name In other Lists	Hieroglyphs
66.	Ahmose I	Nebpehtire	Same name in Saqqara King List.	n sw t n < ra nb F9 t t > A43
67.	Amenhotep I	Djeserkare	Same name in Saqqara King List.	n sw t n < ra Dsr kA > A43
68.	Thutmose I	Aakheperkare	Name missing in Saqqara King List.	n sw t n < ra aA xpr kA > A43
69.	Thutmose II	Aakheperenre	Name missing in Saqqara King List.	n sw t n < ra aA xpr n > A43
70.	Thutmose III	Menkheperre	Name missing in Saqqara King List.	n sw t n < ra mn xpr > A43
71.	Amenhotep II	Aakheperure	Name missing in Saqqara King List.	n sw t n < ra aA xpr Z2 > A43
72.	Thutmose IV	Menkheperure	Name missing in Saqqara King List.	n sw t n < ra mn xpr Z2 > A43
73.	Amenhotep III	Nebmaatre	Name missing in Saqqara King List.	n sw t n < ra mAat nb > A43
74.	Horemheb	Djeserkheperure Setepenre	Same name in Saqqara King List.	n sw t n < ra D45 xpr Z2 stp ra n > A43

==== Nineteenth Dynasty ====
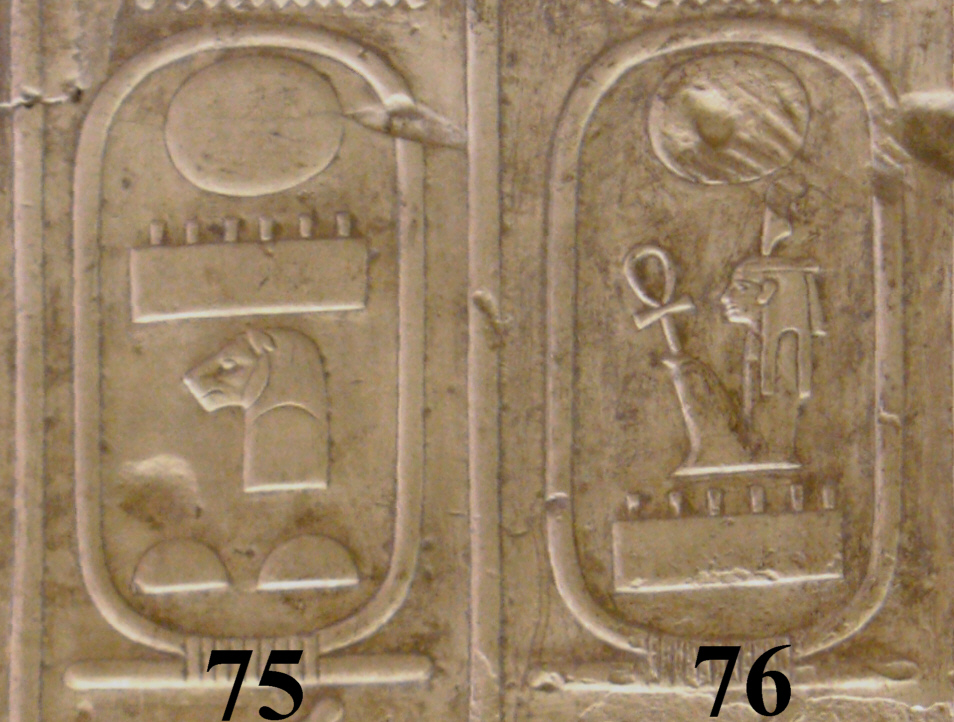
Cartouches 75 and 76 (Click to enlarge)

#	Pharaoh	Name written in List	Name In other Lists	Hieroglyphs
75.	Ramesses I	Menpehtire	Same name in Saqqara King List.	n sw t n < ra mn F9 t t > A43
76.	Seti I	Menmaatre	Same name in Saqqara King List.	n sw t n < ra mAat mn > A43

=== Row 3 ===
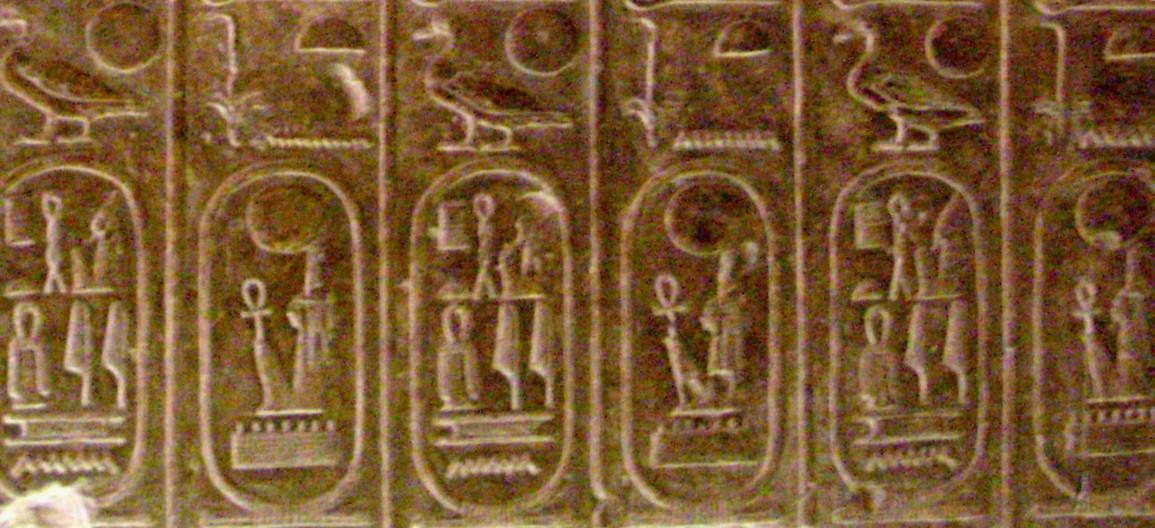
The third row merely contains the Nomen and Prenomen of Seti I repeated 19 times each.

Name type	Name written in List	Hieroglyphs
Nomen of Seti I	Seti Merenptah	m D37 D37 zA ra < p t H A43 V39 i i N36 n > A45
Prenomen of Seti I	Menmaatre	m D37 D37 n sw t n < ra mAat mn > A43

== See also ==
- Abydos King List (Ramesses II)
- Manetho King List
- Karnak King List
- Palermo Stone
- Ramesseum king list
- Saqqara Tablet
- Turin King List
- Medinet Habu king list
