= Pyramid of Neferkare Neby =

Egyptian pyramid

Neferkare Neby
Ancient name
< ra nfr kA > Dd anx O24 Ḏḏ-ˁnḫ Nfr-k3-Rˁ ("Enduring is the Life of Neferkare")
- Constructed: 8th dynasty

The pyramid of Neferkare Neby was the tomb of the Ancient Egyptian King Neferkare Neby, who reigned in the 8th Dynasty. It has never been located and is only known from an inscription.

On the sarcophagus and false door of Queen Ankhesenpepi IV, the name of a pyramid is mentioned. The name is "Enduring Life of Neferkare." How far construction of this pyramid progressed is unclear. It is possible that its remains are only a few metres from the pyramid of Pepi II, where Gustave Jéquier found the false door of Ankhenespepi IV's tomb.

== See also ==
- Egyptian pyramid construction techniques
- List of Egyptian pyramids

== Bibliography ==
- Gustave Jéquier: Les pyramides des reines Neit et Apouit. Imprimerie de l’Institut français d’archéologie orientale, Cairo 1933.
- Christoffer Theis: "Die Pyramiden der Ersten Zwischenzeit. Nach philologischen und archäologischen Quellen." Studien zur Altägyptischen Kultur. (SAK) Vol. 39, Hamburg 2010, pp. 321–339.
