= Imhotep (pharaoh) =

Ancient Egyptian ruler

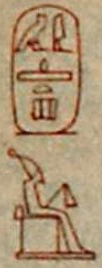
- Drawing of pharaoh Imhotep's cartouche, from a rock inscription in the Wadi Hammamat.

Pharaoh
- Reign: Unknown
- Predecessor: Unknown
- Successor: Unknown
Royal titulary
Prenomen
Imhotep
ı͗ı͗-m-ḥtp
"He who comes in peace"

| M23 X1 L2 X1 | M18 G17 R4 X1 Q3 |
- Children: Djaty
- Dynasty: 9th Dynasty

Imhotep (Ancient Egyptian: ı͗ı͗-m-ḥtp) was an ephemeral ruler that probably reigned in the 9th Dynasty. However, he also may have ruled during the 10th Dynasty of ancient Egypt. Imhotep is only known from two rock inscriptions in the Wadi Hammamat.

== Reign ==
The only event known from his reign in some detail is a quarrying expedition to the Wadi Hammamat, perhaps to procure a monument for the king, led by his son Djaty. The large number of workmen (2350) sent out on this expedition, shows that Imhotep may not have had control over the Wadi Hammamat.

Another inscription from the Wadi Hammamat, mentions some work done by the eldest son of Imhotep. This work was probably done as part of an expedition, since the inscription lists numbers of people in different types of occupations that took part.
