= Setut =

Ancient Egyptian pharaoh

- Senen...

Pharaoh
- Reign: between 2160 and 2130 BCE
- Predecessor: uncertain Nebkaure Khety or Wahkare Khety
- Successor: [name lost]
Royal titulary
Prenomen
Senen[...]
z-nn...

M23 X1 L2 X1	s M22 M22 n n A53 HASH
- Dynasty: 9th Dynasty

Setut or Senen... was a pharaoh of the 9th Dynasty of ancient Egypt (between 2160 and 2130 BCE, during the First Intermediate Period).

There is no contemporary archaeological find attesting the existence of this ruler since he is definitely known only by the Turin King List, where his incomplete name Senen[...] appears in position 4.22. He should have reigned from Herakleopolis after Nebkaure Khety or Wahkare Khety, being one of the ephemeral rulers of the late 9th Dynasty. He was succeeded by an unknown king of the same dynasty.
