= Qakare Ibi =

Egyptian pharaoh

- Aba, Iby, Kakare, Kakaure, Qaikare, Qakaure
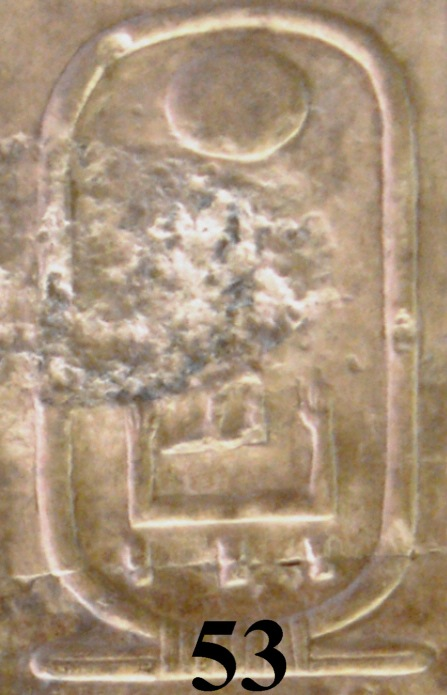
- Ibi's cartouche on the Abydos king list

Pharaoh
- Reign: Around 2 years, 1 month, and 1 day, c. 2170 – c. 2167 BC
- Predecessor: Possibly Neferkamin Anu
- Successor: Possibly Neferkaure
Royal titulary
Prenomen
Qakare
Q3j-k3-Rˁ
Mighty is the Ka of Ra
M23 t L2 t < N5 A28 Z1 D28 >
Abydos King List
Qakaure
Q3j-k3w-Rˁ
Mighty are the Kas of Ra
< N5 A28 D28 Z2 >
Nomen
Ibi
jbj
The kid
G39 N5 < i D58 i >
Turin King List
Ibi
jbj
The kid
< i D58 E8 > G7
- Died: c. 2167 BC
- Burial: Pyramid of Ibi 29°50′30″N 31°13′4″E
- Dynasty: 8th Dynasty

Qakare Ibi (died c. 2167 BC) was an ancient Egyptian king during the early First Intermediate Period (2181–2055 BC) and the 14th ruler of the Eighth Dynasty. As such, Ibi's seat of power was Memphis and he probably did not hold power over all of Egypt. Ibi is one of the best attested kings of the Eighth Dynasty due to the discovery of his small pyramid in South Saqqara.

== Attestations ==
Qakare Ibi is attested on the 53rd entry of the Abydos King List, a king list which was redacted some 900 years after the First Intermediate Period during the reign of Seti I. According to Kim Ryholt's latest reconstruction of the Turin canon, another king list compiled in the Ramesside era, Qakare Ibi is also attested there on column 5, line 10 (Gardiner 4.11, von Beckerath 4.10). The Turin canon further indicates that he reigned for "2 years, 1 month and 1 day". The only other attestion for Qakare Ibi is his pyramid in South Saqqara.

== Pyramid complex ==
At Saqqara-South, Qakare Ibi was buried in a small pyramid. It was discovered by Karl Richard Lepsius in the 19th century who listed it as the number XL in his pioneering list of pyramids. The pyramid was excavated from 1929 until 1931 by Gustave Jéquier. Its ancient name is lost and unknown.

Ibi's pyramid is the last built in Saqqara, located to the northeast of Shepseskaf's tomb and near the causeway of the Pyramid of Pepi II. It is very similar in plan, dimensions and decorations to the pyramids of the queens of Pepi II, the last great pharaoh of the Old Kingdom. Consequently, it was proposed that the pyramid was originally that of Ankhnespepi IV (ˁnḫ-n=s ppj, "Pepi lives for her") a wife of Pepi II, and was only later appropriated by Ibi. Adjacent to the pyramid is a small chapel where the funerary cult took place. No trace of a causeway nor of a valley temple has been found to this day, and it is likely that there never was any.

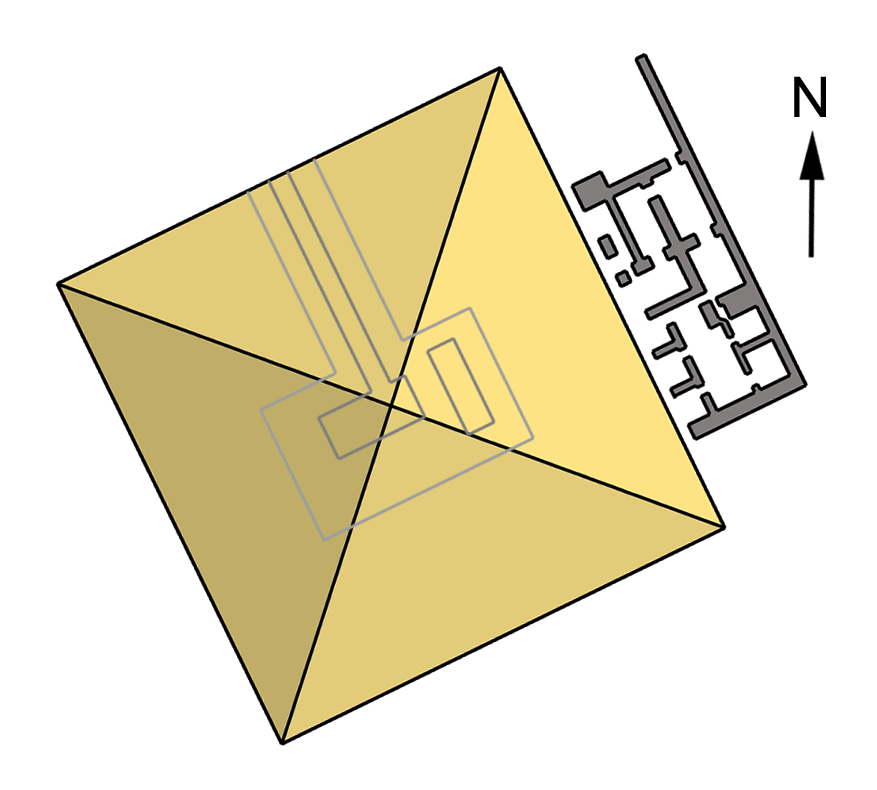
Pyramid complex of Qakare Ibi, Saqqara

=== The pyramid ===
Ibi's pyramid is not oriented to any cardinal point, being rather on a northwest–southeast axis. The edifice would have been around 31.5 m (103 ft) large and 21 m (69 ft) high with a slope of 53°7′ at the time of its construction. The core of the pyramid was built with limestone blocks of local origin, most of which are now gone, probably reused in later constructions. As a result, the monument appears today as a 3 m (9.8 ft) high heap of mud and limestone chips in the sands of Saqqara. On some of the remaining blocks, inscriptions in red ink were found mentioning a chief of the Libyans, the meaning of which is unclear. It seems that even though the foundations for the outer casing of the pyramid were laid, the casing itself was never mounted.

=== Internal structures ===
On the north side of the edifice, Jéquier found an 8 m (26 ft) long limestone-clad corridor leading down with an inclination of 25° to a large granite portcullis. Behind this portcullis lay the king's burial chamber. Both the corridor and the walls of the burial chamber were inscribed with the last known instance of the Pyramid Texts. The texts seem to have been directly inscribed for Ibi rather than appropriated by him, although the possibility of the texts being rescribed can not be ruled out. Jéquier judged the quality of the inscriptions as "very average". Furthermore, the placement of the spells appears relatively indiscriminate. The burial chamber's ceiling was flat and decorated with stars. It was probably made of a single 5 m (16 ft) long block of Tura limestone now missing.

Below is an example of the Pyramid Text from the pyramid of Qakare Ibi.

Spell 268:

This Ibi will wash himself as Re appears and the Great Ennead shines.
If the Ombite [ Seth ] becomes elevated to the fore [of the shrine],
Ibi will take over the elite as a limb in Ibi.
Qakare will seize the wirt-crown [from the Two] Enneads
Isis will nurture Qakare and Nephthys will suckle Ibi
Horus will take Ibi at his two fingers, he will purify Qakare in the Jackal Lake
and release the ka of Qakare from the Lake of the Duat.
He will purge the flesh of the ka of Ibi and of the body of Qakare
with what is on the shoulders of Re in the Akhet, which he receives
when the Two Lands shine so that he opens the faces of the gods.

On the west side of the burial chamber is a false door and a huge granite block on which once stood the sarcophagus of the king. On the east side there is a serdab for the statue of the Ka of the deceased. Today a large block of concrete protects the burial chamber.

=== Chapel ===
Adjacent to the east side of the pyramid is a small mudbrick chapel which served as temple for the cult of the dead king. The entrance of the chapel is located on its north side. Inside the temple, immediately against the pyramid wall is an offering hall where Jequier found a stone washbasin as well as stele or a false door of which only the foundations remain. An alabaster tray and obsidian mortar tools were also discovered there.

The south part of the chapel is occupied by magazine rooms.

== See also ==
- List of Egyptian pyramids
- List of megalithic sites

== Bibliography ==
- Mark Lehner. The secret of the pyramids of Egypt, Orbis, Munich 1999, ISBN 3-572-01039-X, p. 164
- Christopher Theis: The Pyramids of the First Intermediate Period. After philological and archaeological sources (= studies of ancient Egyptian culture. Vol 39, 2010). pp. 321–339.
- Miroslav Verner. The Pyramids Universe Books, New 1998, ISBN 3-499-60890-1, pp. 415–416.

Preceded by Possibly Neferkamin Anu	King of Egypt c. 2170 – c. 2167 BC	Succeeded by Possibly Neferkaure
