= Khuiqer =

Egyptian pharaoh

- Chuiqer
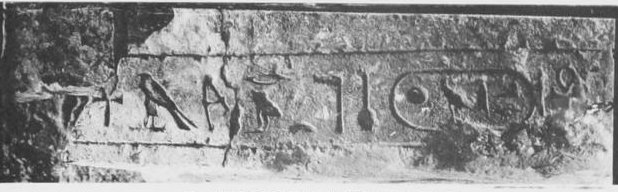
- Lintel with the cartouche of Khuiqer, from Abydos.

Pharaoh
- Reign: uncertain datation
- Predecessor: n.d.
- Successor: n.d.
Royal titulary
Horus name
Merut
Mrwt
G5	U6 r w t
Nomen
Khuiqer
ḫwj-qr

G39 N5	Aa1 G43 i q r
- Dynasty: n.d.

Khuiqer was an ancient Egyptian pharaoh known only for a limestone lintel bearing part of his royal titulary, found in Abydos by British Egyptologist Flinders Petrie at the beginning of the 20th century; the lintel is now located at the University of Pennsylvania Museum of Archaeology and Anthropology (E 17316 A-B). His datation is extremely uncertain since he was tentatively placed in both the First and the Second Intermediate Period.

== Dynastic collocation ==
After the finding of the lintel, Petrie believed the royal name to be Uaqerre but was doubtful about his datation, and simply placed him between the Seventh and the Fourteenth Dynasties. Shortly after, Gaston Maspero attributed the mysterious king to the Sixth to the Eleventh Dynasty of Egypt range. Max Pieper more correctly read the name Khuiqer, claiming that this king should have reigned between the Thirteenth and the 18th Dynasties. Ludwig Borchardt came to the same conclusion, while in 1907 Henri Gauthier, following instead Maspero, placed him again in the First Intermediate Period. When, more recently, the German Egyptologist Detlef Franke proposed the existence of the Abydos Dynasty (a dynasty of local pharaohs who might have shortly ruled upon the Abydene territory during the Second Intermediate Period), he placed Khuiqer inside of it. Jürgen von Beckerath attributed him to the Second Intermediate Period too, following the claim that the block came from a building of Senusret I, although he admitted that Khuiqer's Horus name, Merut, seemed peculiar for this period. This Horus name was also the main topic for Kim Ryholt's attribution: he argued that Merut is too simple when compared to the Horus names of the Second Intermediate Period, which usually are composed or two or even three different words. Ryholt then suggested an earlier placement for Khuiqer, at an imprecise time during the First Intermediate Period.
