= Nebkaure Khety =

Egyptian pharaoh

- Kheti, Akhtoy, Achtoi
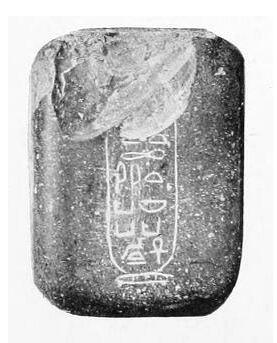
- Jasper weight with the cartouche of Nebkaure Khety

Pharaoh
- Reign: between 2160 and 2130 BCE
- Predecessor: Neferkare
- Successor: Possibly Setut
Royal titulary
Prenomen
Nebkaure
Nb-kꜣw-rˁ
Lord of the ka is Ra

M23 X1 L2 X1	N5 nb D28 Z1 Z2
Nomen
Khety
ẖtj(j)

G39 N5	X t i i

Nebkaure Khety was an ancient Egyptian king of the 9th or 10th Dynasty, during the First Intermediate Period.

== Reign ==
Practically nothing is known about the events of Nebkaure's reign; due to the contrasting opinions of scholars, even its dating is still difficult. Many Egyptologists assign Nebkaure to the 9th Dynasty, possibly the fourth king (and the second king bearing the name Khety), just after Neferkare. On the other hand, other scholars such as Jürgen von Beckerath believe instead that Nebkaure reigned during the subsequent 10th Dynasty, possibly before Meryibre Khety.

== Attestations ==
Like many of the kings who preceded or succeeded him, attestations of Nebkaure Khety are scant.

=== Red Jasper Weight ===
The only contemporary object bearing his cartouche is a weight made from red jasper which was unearthed by Flinders Petrie at Tell el-Retabah, a location along the Wadi Tumilat in the eastern Delta; this weight is now exhibited at the Petrie Museum (UC11782). Weight was slightly damaged, Petrie gives its weight as 1,850 of his grain unit. Divided by 9 units on the stone, it gives a value that must have been about 205 grains, i.e. around 15 grams, which represents gold deben.

=== The Story about the Eloquent Peasant ===
The name of a king Nebkaure also appears on a late Middle Kingdom papyrus (Berlin 3023) containing part of the well known and popular story The Eloquent Peasant; it is likely that Nebkaure Khety is the king featured in that story.

=== Non-contemporary attestations ===
On the Turin King List he was tentatively placed in the register 4.21.
