= Djedkare Shemai =

Egyptian pharaoh

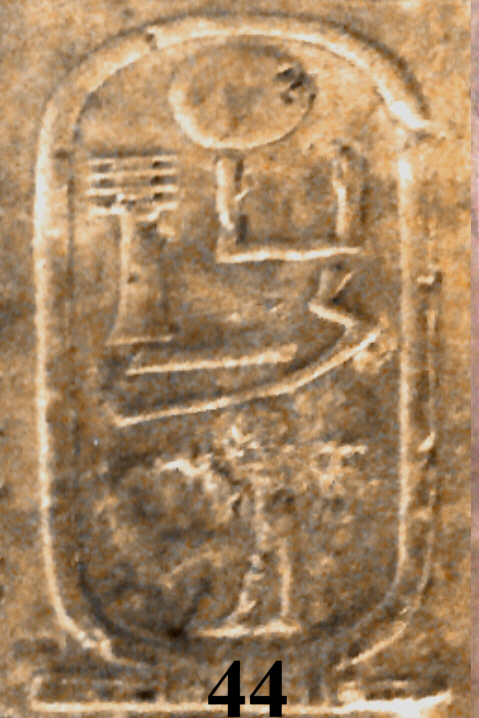
- The cartouche of Djedkare Shemai on the Abydos King List

Pharaoh
- Predecessor: Possibly Neby
- Successor: Possibly Neferkare Khendu
Royal titulary
Prenomen
Djedkare Shemai
Ḏd k3 rˁ šm3j
The Ka of Ra endures, the nomad/wanderer

M23 X1 L2 X1	N5 R11 D28 U4 A33

Djedkare Shemai (sometimes referred to as Djedkare II because of Djedkare Isesi) may have been an ancient Egyptian king during the Eighth Dynasty of the First Intermediate Period. His name is only attested on the Abydos King List, the primary source for identifying seventh/eighth dynasties (combined). Djedkare Shemai is absent from the Turin canon as a large lacuna in this document affects most kings of the 7th/8th Dynasty. No contemporary document or building with his name has been found.
