= Neferkare Pepiseneb =

Egyptian pharaoh

- Neferkare Khered Seneb, Neferkare VI
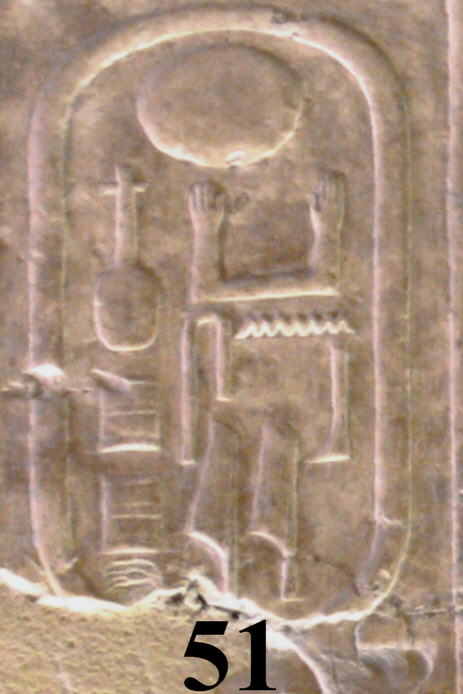
- The cartouche of Neferkare Pepiseneb on the Abydos King List

Pharaoh
- Reign: c. 2181 – c. 2171 BC
- Predecessor: Possibly Neferkahor
- Successor: Possibly Neferkamin Anu
Royal titulary
Prenomen
Neferkare Pepi Kheredseneb
Nfr-k3-Rˁ pjpj ẖrd-snb
Perfect is the Ka of Ra, Pepi the younger is healthy
G39 N5 < N5 nfr D28 Q3 Q3 i i A17 G7 S29 n D58 >
Abydos King List:
Neferkare Pepiseneb
Nfr-k3-Rˁ pjpj snb
Perfect is the Ka of Ra, Pepi is healthy
G39 N5 < N5 nfr D28 Q3 Q3 i i S29 n D58 >
Turin canon:
Neferkare
Nfr-k3-Rˁ
Neferkare
< nfr D28 G7 > G7
Nomen
Turin canon:
Kheredseneb
ẖrd-snb
The younger is healthy
A17 G7 S29 n D58 A1
- Father: Possibly Neferkare II
- Mother: Ankhesenpepi V
- Died: c. 2171 BC
- Dynasty: 8th Dynasty

Neferkare VI Pepiseneb (died c. 2171 BC) was an ancient Egyptian king of the Eighth Dynasty during the early First Intermediate Period (2181–2055 BC). According to the Egyptologists Kim Ryholt, Jürgen Beckerath, and Darrell Baker, he was the twelfth king of the Eighth Dynasty.

== Attestations ==
The name Neferkare VI Pepiseneb is attested on the Abydos King List (number 51), but not elsewhere. However, Jürgen Beckerath has proposed that Neferkare Pepiseneb is to be identified with a "Neferkare Khered Seneb" appearing on the Turin canon. As such, Neferkare Pepiseneb would be the first king of the Eighth Dynasty, following Ntyiqrt (who might be Neitiqerty Siptah) whose name appears on the Turin canon, a large lacuna in the document affecting the intervening kings of the dynasty. Both of these sources are dated to long after the eighth dynasty, to the 19th dynasty and later and there are no contemporary attestations of this period.

== Epithet ==
The epithet Khered given to Neferkare Pepiseneb in the Turin canon means "child" or "young". Consequently, "Neferkare Khered Seneb" is translated as Neferkare The Child is Healthy.

Several hypotheses have been put forth by Egyptologists concerning this epithet. Hratch Papazian proposes that the fact that the king was called Khered on the Turin canon hints at his youthful age upon ascending to the throne. In reality, however, the epithet Khered always indicates that he had the same name as his father, making him most likely the son of a previous king named Neferkare. It is unknown which one, however, and as the 7th and 8th dynasty kings had very short reigns, it could even have been Pepi II Neferkare.

== Reign ==
According to Ryholt's latest reading of the Turin canon, Neferkare VI Pepiseneb reigned at least one year. As all kings from Menkare until Neferkahor all had very short reigns (all within the year 2181 BC) and Neferkare VI Pepiseneb died around 2171 BC, he must have reigned 10 years (2181-2171 BC).

Preceded by Possibly Neferkahor	King of Egypt c. 2181 – c. 2171 BC	Succeeded by Possibly Neferkamin Anu
