= Eighth Dynasty of Egypt =

Ancient Egyptian dynasty

- ca. 2181 BC–ca. 2160 BC
- Capital: Memphis
- Common languages: Egyptian language
- Religion: ancient Egyptian religion
- Government: Absolute monarchy
- Historical era: Bronze Age
  - Established: ca. 2181 BC
  - Disestablished: ca. 2160 BC
Preceded by
Sixth Dynasty of Egypt
Seventh Dynasty of Egypt
Succeeded by
Ninth Dynasty of Egypt
Tenth Dynasty of Egypt
Eleventh Dynasty of Egypt

The Eighth Dynasty of ancient Egypt (Dynasty VIII) was a little-known and short-lived dynasty of pharaohs who ruled in quick succession during the early 22nd century BC, likely based in Memphis. The Eighth Dynasty held sway at a time referred to as the very end of the Old Kingdom or the beginning of the First Intermediate Period. The power of the pharaohs was waning while that of the provincial governors, known as nomarchs, was increasingly important, the Egyptian state having by then effectively turned into a feudal system. In spite of close relations between the Memphite kings and powerful nomarchs, notably in Coptos, the Eighth Dynasty was eventually overthrown by the nomarchs of Heracleopolis Magna, who founded the Ninth Dynasty. The Eighth Dynasty is occasionally grouped with the preceding Seventh Dynasty due to the absence of archaeological evidence for the latter, which is considered by some scholars to be possibly fictitious.

Egyptologists estimate that the Eighth Dynasty ruled Egypt for approximately 20–45 years and various dates have been proposed: 2190–2165 BC, 2181–2160 BC, 2191–2145 BC, 2150–2118 BC.

== Sources ==
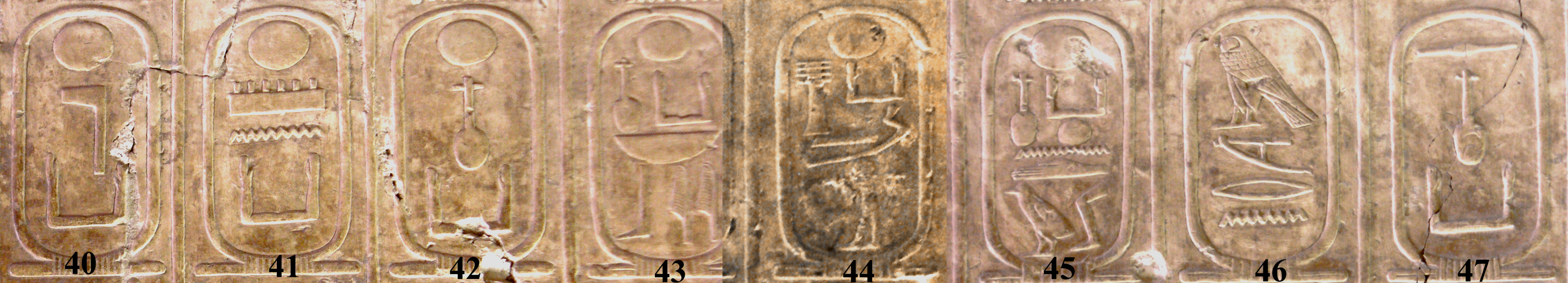
Kings of the 8th Dynasty on the Abydos king list, from Netjerkare Siptah to Neferkamin.

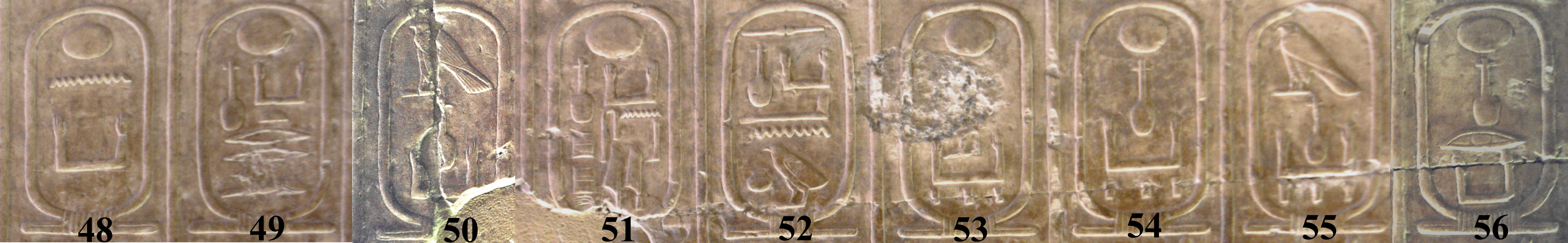
Kings of the 8th Dynasty on the Abydos king list, from Nikare until Neferirkare.

=== Historical ===
==== New Kingdom sources ====
Two historical sources dating to the New Kingdom list kings belonging to the Eighth Dynasty. The earliest of the two and main historical source on the Eighth Dynasty is the Abydos king list, written during the reign of Seti I. The kings listed on the entries 40 to 56 of the Abydos king list are placed between the end of the Sixth Dynasty of the Old Kingdom period and the beginning of the Eleventh Dynasty of the Middle Kingdom. Furthermore, the names of these kings are different from those known from the Ninth and Tenth Dynasties, none of which are on the Abydos list. As a consequence, entries 40 to 56 of the list are assigned to the Seventh and Eighth Dynasties.

The other New Kingdom source on the Eighth Dynasty is the Turin canon, written during the reign of Ramses II. The Turin papyrus was copied from an earlier source which, as the Egyptologist Kim Ryholt has shown, was itself riddled with lacunae and must have been in a poor state. In addition, the Turin papyrus is itself heavily damaged and cannot be read without much difficulty. In total three names are present on papyrus fragments which might be allocated to Eighth Dynasty kings. These are Netjerkare Siptah, another hard to read name and finally, that of Qakare Ibi, the fifty-third king on the Abydos king list. There seems to be room for two or three more kings before the end of the dynasty as recorded on the list. This would indicate that the missing parts of the Turin canon probably contained the kings in the fifty-first to fifty-fifth registers of the Abydos King List. Because the Turin papyrus omits the first nine kings on the Abydos list, W.C. Hayes thinks it reasonable that the Egyptians may have divided Dynasties VII and VIII at this point.

==== Ptolemaic source ====
The Egyptian priest Manetho wrote a history of Egypt during the 3rd century BC known as the Aegyptiaca. Manetho's work has not survived to this day and is only known to us via three later writers who quoted from it. Unfortunately, these three sources are exceedingly difficult to work with. For example, they often contradict each other, as is the case for the two ancient historians – Sextus Julius Africanus and Eusebius of Caesarea – who quote from the section of the Aegyptiaca regarding the Seventh and Eighth Dynasties. Africanus claims that the 7th Dynasty consisted of 70 kings that ruled during a period of seventy days in Memphis, and the 8th Dynasty consisted of 27 kings who reigned for 146 years. However, Eusebius records that during the 7th Dynasty five kings ruled over seventy five days, and the 8th Dynasty includes five kings who ruled for 100 years. Seventy kings in seventy days is usually considered the correct version of Manetho concerning the Seventh Dynasty, but likely not a factual account of history. Rather, this is interpreted to mean that the pharaohs of this period were extremely ephemeral, and the use of seventy may be a pun on the fact that this was Manetho's Seventh Dynasty. Because Manetho does not provide actual historical data on this period and no archeological evidence for the Seventh Dynasty has emerged, many Egyptologists have argued that this dynasty is fictitious. Concerning the Eighth Dynasty, it is now widely agreed that Manetho's estimate for its duration is a very substantial overestimation of the reality.

=== Contemporary evidence ===
The main archaeological evidence for kings of the Eighth Dynasty are royal decrees discovered in Coptos, which name some of the last pharaohs of the dynasty. Further tentative evidence for the early kings of the dynasty comes from tombs in Saqqara, in particular the pyramid of Qakare Ibi in Saqqara. Beyond that, there are royal inscriptions found in the Wadi Hammamat and in Upper Egypt, as well as non-royal ones from Upper Egypt as well.

== End of the Old Kingdom and decline into chaos ==
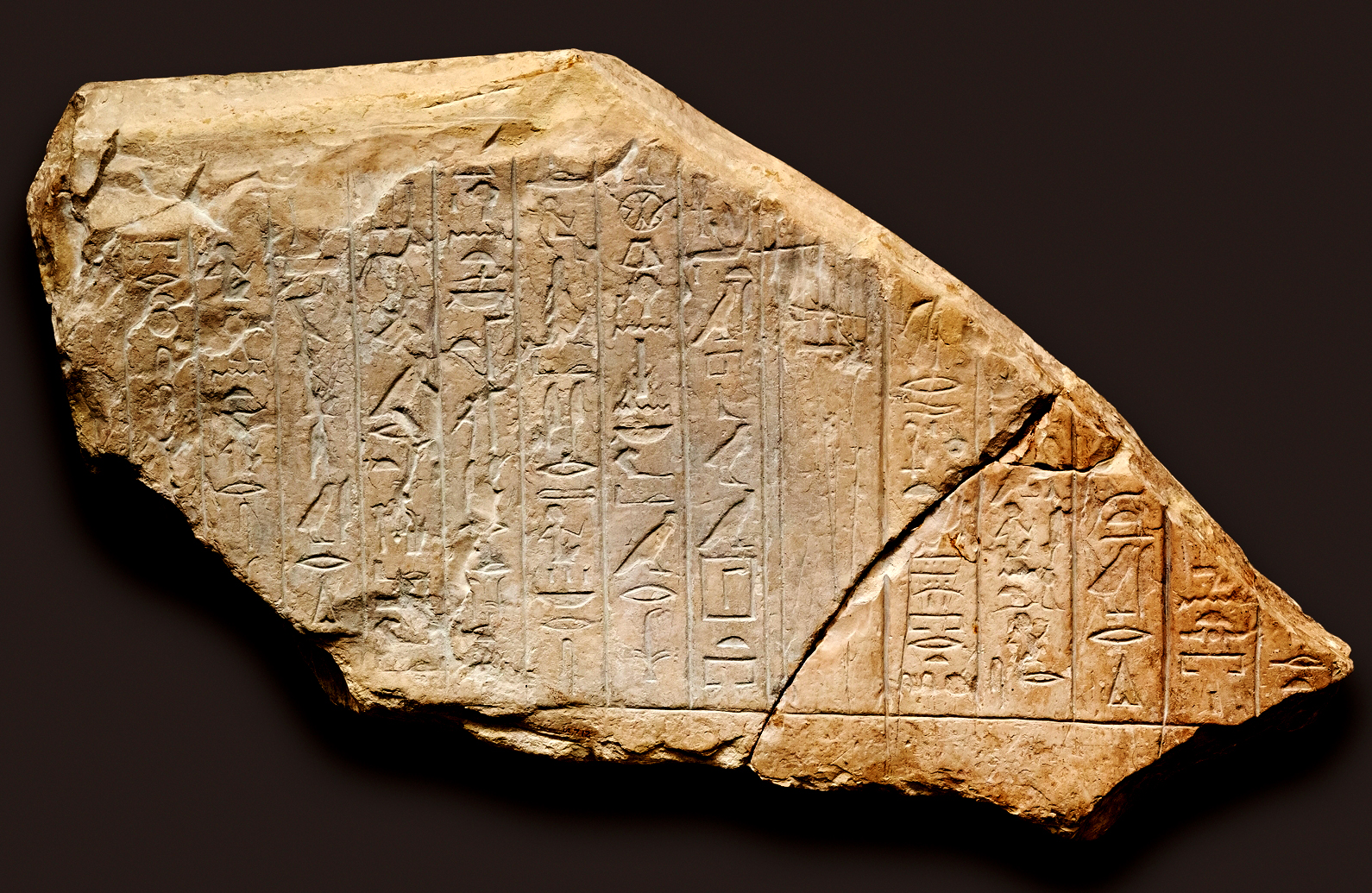
Fragments of two Coptos Decrees dating to the reign of Neferkauhor, end of the Eighth Dynasty.

The Eighth Dynasty has traditionally been classified as the first dynasty of the First Intermediate Period owing to the ephemeral nature of its kings' reigns as well as the sparsity of contemporary evidence, hinting at a decline of the state into chaos. Recent re-appraisal of the archaeological evidence has shown a strong continuity between the Sixth and Eighth Dynasties, so that Egyptologist Hratch Papazian has proposed that the Eighth Dynasty rather than the Sixth should be seen as the last of the Old Kingdom period.

Given that five Eighth Dynasty kings bore Pepi II's throne name Neferkare as part of their own names, they may have been descendants of 6th Dynasty, who were trying to hold on to some sort of power. Some of the acts of the final four Dynasty VIII kings are recorded in their decrees to Shemay, a vizier during this period, although only Qakare Ibi can be connected to any monumental construction. His pyramid has been found at Saqqara near that of Pepi II and, like its predecessors, had the Pyramid Texts written on the walls.

However many kings there actually were, it is clear that during this time period a breakdown of the central authority of Egypt was underway. The rulers of these dynasties were based in Memphis and seem to have relied on the power of the nomarchs of Coptos, on whom they bestowed titles and honours. This must have been to no avail as the Eighth Dynasty was eventually overthrown by a rival group based in Herakleopolis Magna.

== Rulers ==
Given the lack of evidence for the Seventh Dynasty, all kings mentioned on the Abydos king list in the entries after that of Merenre Nemtyemsaf II and before that of Montuhotep II are usually attributed to the Eighth Dynasty. Following Jürgen von Beckerath, they are :

Dynasty VIII as per von Beckerath
Name	Comments
Netjerkare Siptah	Sometimes classified as the last king of the 6th Dynasty. Possibly identical with Nitocris.
Menkare	Possibly attested by a relief from the tomb of queen Neit.
Neferkare II	
Neferkare Neby	Planned or started a pyramid "Neferkare Neby is Enduring of Life", possibly at Saqqara.
Djedkare Shemai	
Neferkare Khendu	
Merenhor	
Neferkamin	
Nikare	Possibly attested by a cylinder seal.
Neferkare Tereru	
Neferkahor	Attested by a cylinder seal.
Neferkare Pepiseneb	Turin Canon gives at least one year.
Neferkamin Anu	
Qakare Ibi	Turin Canon gives rule of two years, one month, one day. Attested by his pyramid at Saqqara.
Neferkaure	Turin Canon gives rule of 4 years and 2 months, attested by a decree concerning the temple of Min.
Khwiwihepu Neferkauhor	Turin Canon gives rule of 2 years, 1 month and 1 day, attested by eight decrees concerning the temple of Min, and an inscription in the tomb of vizier Shemay.
Neferirkare	Turin Canon gives a reign of 1 1/2 years. Maybe identical to Horus Demedjibtawy. If so, he is attested by a decree concerning the temple of Min.

The Egyptologist Hratch Papazian believes that such a reconstruction gives too much weight to Manetho's account, according to which the Seventh Dynasty is essentially fictitious and a metaphor of chaos. Instead Papazian proposes that the earliest of the above kings are immediate successors of Pepi II and should be attributed to the Sixth Dynasty, while those just after them belong to a short-lived Seventh Dynasty. Then the Eighth Dynasty would only start with the well-attested Qakare-Ibi:

Dynasty VIII as per Papazian
Name
Qakare Ibi
Neferkaure
Khwiwihepu Neferkauhor
Neferirkare

In addition, the identity and chronological position and extent of rule of the following rulers is highly uncertain: Wadjkare, Khuiqer, Khui and Iytjenu.

== Comparison of regnal lists ==
The kings of the seventh and eighth dynasties are rarely recorded on king lists. However, the Abydos King List provides the most complete list with 17 names from Netjerkare Siptah to Neferirkare. The Turin King List includes 7 names for this period and omits the kings who reigned between Netjerkare Siptah and Neferkare Pepiseneb. The Turin list is in a fragmentary state, and some names and reign lengths are lost.

Pharaoh	Abydos King List	Turin King List	Turin King List Reign Length
Netjerkare Siptah	Netjerikare	Netiqerty Siptah	Lost
Menkare	Menkare	–	–
Neferkare II	Neferkare	–	–
Neferkare Neby	Neferkare Neby	–	–
Djedkare Shemai	Djedkare Shemai	–	–
Neferkare Khendu	Neferkare Khendu	–	–
Merenhor	Merenhor	–	–
Neferkamin	Sneferka	–	–
Nikare	Nikare	–	–
Neferkare Tereru	Neferkare Tereru	–	–
Neferkahor	Neferkahor	–	–
Neferkare Pepiseneb	Neferkare Pepiseneb	Neferka Khered Seneb	Lost
Neferkamin Anu	Sneferka Anu	Nefer ...	Lost
Qakare Ibi	Kaukare	Ibi ...	2 years, 1 month and 1 day
Neferkaure	Neferkaure	Lost	4 years, 2 months and 0 days
Khwiwihepu Neferkauhor	Neferkauhor	Lost	2 years, 1 month and 1 day
Neferirkare	Neferirkare	Lost	1 year and half month

Preceded by Sixth Dynasty (Seventh)	Dynasty of Egypt c. 2181 – 2160 BC	Succeeded by Ninth Dynasty
