= Neferkahor =

Egyptian pharaoh

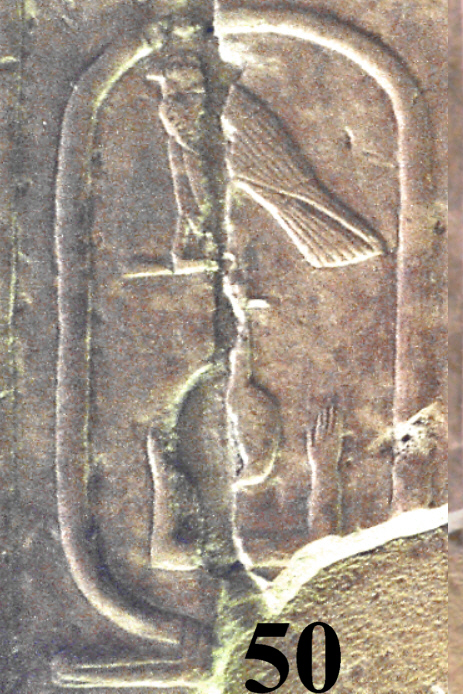
- The cartouche of Neferkahor on the Abydos King List

Pharaoh
- Reign: c. 2184 – c. 2181 BC
- Predecessor: Possibly Tereru
- Successor: Possibly Pepiseneb
Royal titulary
Prenomen
Neferkahor
Nfr-k3-Ḥr
Perfect is the Ka of Horus
M23 t L2 t < G5 nfr D28 >
- Died: c. 2181 BC

Neferkahor (died c. 2181 BC) may have been ancient Egyptian king of the Eighth Dynasty during the First Intermediate Period. According to Egyptologists Jürgen Beckerath and Darrell Baker, he was the eleventh king of this dynasty. His name is attested on the Abydos King List (number 50) and on a black steatite cylinder seal of unknown provenance. Neferkahor is absent from the Turin canon as a large lacuna in this document affects most kings of the 7th/8th Dynasty. No contemporary document or building with his name has been found.
