= Merenhor =

Egyptian pharaoh

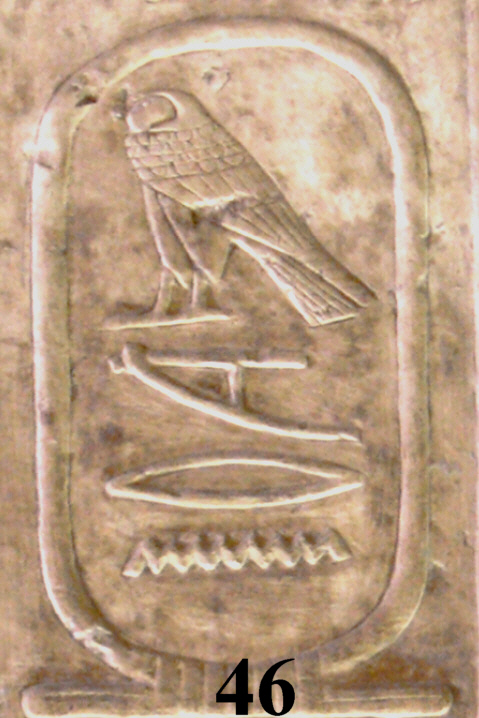
- The cartouche of Merenhor on the Abydos King List

Pharaoh
- Predecessor: Possibly Neferkare Khendu
- Successor: Possibly Neferkamin
Royal titulary
Prenomen
Merenhor
Mr n Ḥr
Beloved by Horus

M23 X1 L2 X1	G5 U7 D21 n

Merenhor may have been an Eighth Dynasty king of ancient Egypt during the First Intermediate Period. His name is only attested on the Abydos King List (n. 46). Merenhor is absent from the Turin canon as a large lacuna in this document affects most kings of the 7th/8th Dynasty. No contemporary document or building with his name has been found.
