= Netjerkare Siptah =

Egyptian pharaoh

- Neitiqerty Siptah, Nitocris, Siptah I, Netjerkare
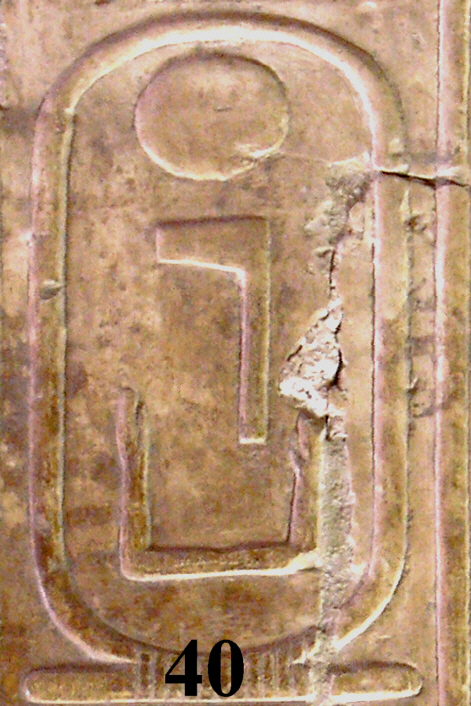
- The cartouche of Netjerkare on the Abydos King List.

Pharaoh
- Reign: c. 3 years 2184–2181 BC
- Predecessor: Merenre Nemtyemsaf II
- Successor: Menkare (Eighth Dynasty)
Royal titulary
Prenomen
Abydos king list
Netjerkare
Nṯr-k3-Rˁ
Divine is the Ka of Ra
M23 t n < N5 R8 D28 >Turin canon
Neitiqerty
Nt-iḳrti
Neith is excellent
sw bit < n t Z5 i q r t Z4 G7 > G7
Nomen
Turin canon
Siptah
s3-ptḥ
Son of Ptah
G39 Z1 G7 t p V28 G7
- Dynasty: Sixth Dynasty or Eighth Dynasty

Netjerkare Siptah (also Neitiqerty Siptah and possibly the origin of the legendary figure Nitocris) was an ancient Egyptian pharaoh, the seventh and last ruler of the Sixth Dynasty. Alternatively some scholars classify him as the first king of the Seventh or Eighth Dynasty. As the last king of the 6th Dynasty, Netjerkare Siptah is considered by some Egyptologists to be the last king of the Old Kingdom period.

Netjerkare Siptah enjoyed a short reign in the early 22nd century BC, at a time when the power of the pharaoh was crumbling and that of the local nomarchs was on the rise. Although he was male, Netjerkare Siptah is most likely the same person as the female ruler Nitocris mentioned by Herodotus and Manetho.

== Attestation ==
The prenomen Netjerkare is inscribed on the 40th entry of the Abydos King List, a king list redacted during the reign of Seti I. Netjerkare immediately follows Merenre Nemtyemsaf II on the list. The prenomen Netjerkare is also attested on a single copper tool of unknown provenance and now in the British Museum. The nomen Neitiqerty Siptah is inscribed on the Turin canon, on the 5th column, 7th row (4th column, 7th row in Gardiner's reconstruction of the canon).

== Identification with Nitocris ==
In his Histories, the Greek historian Herodotus records a legend according to which an Egyptian queen Nitocris took revenge on the murder of her brother and husband by a rioting mob. She diverted the Nile to drown all of the murderers during a banquet where she had gathered them. This story is also reported by the Egyptian priest Manetho, who wrote a history of Egypt called Aegyptiaca in the 3rd century BC. Manetho writes of Nitocris that she was "... braver than all the men of her time, the most beautiful of all women, fair-skinned with red cheeks". Manetho goes further and credits her with the construction of the Pyramid of Menkaure "By her, it is said, the third pyramid was reared, with the aspect of a mountain". Although the murdered king is not named by Herodotus, Nitocris follows immediately Merenre Nemtyemsaf II in Manetho's Aegyptiaca and so he is often identified as this king. Since the king following Merenre Nemtyemsaf II in the Abydos king list is "Netjerkare", the German egyptologist Ludwig Stern proposed in 1883 that Netjerkare and Nitocris are the same person.

The Danish Egyptologist Kim Ryholt supports Stern's hypothesis. Ryholt argues that the name "Nitocris" is a result of conflation and distortion from the name "Netjerkare". Confirming this analysis, the Turin canon, another king list redacted during the early Ramesside period lists a Neitiqerti Siptah at an uncertain position. Ryholt's microscopic analyses of the fibers of the papyrus suggest that the fragment where this name appears belongs to the end of the 6th Dynasty, immediately after Merenre Nemtyemsaf II. Since on the Abydos king list, Netjerkare is placed in the equivalent spot that Neitiqerti Siptah holds on the Turin canon, the two are to be identified. Additionally, the nomen "Siptah" is masculine indicating that Nitocris was in fact a male pharaoh. The name "Nitocris" probably originates from the prenomen "Neitiqerti", which itself either comes from a corruption of "Netjerkare", or else "Neitiqerti Siptah" was the nomen of the king and "Netjerkare" his prenomen.
