= Neferkamin Anu =

Egyptian pharaoh

- Sneferka Anu, Seneferka Any, Nefer, Nufe
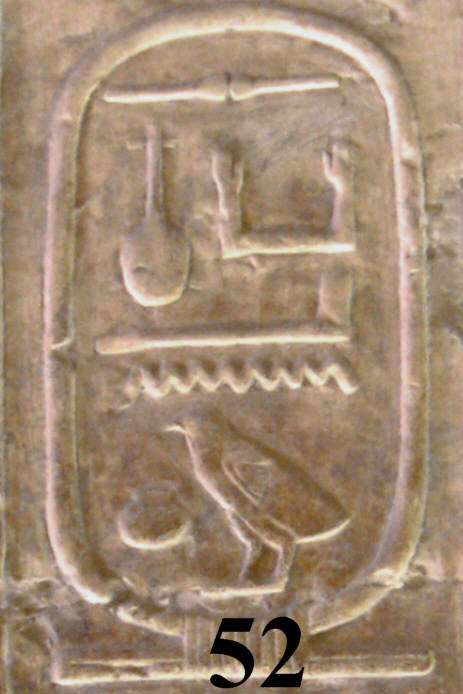
- The cartouche of Neferkamin Anu on the Abydos King List reading Sneferka Anu

Pharaoh
- Reign: c. 2171 – c. 2170 BC
- Predecessor: Possibly Pepiseneb
- Successor: Possibly Ibi
Royal titulary
Prenomen
Neferkamin Anu
Nfr-k3-Mn ˁnw
Perfect is the Ka of Min, Anu
< R22 D28 F35 D36 n W24 G43 >
Turin canon:
Nefer
Nfr
The perfect one/The beautiful one
< F35 I9 r G7 > G7
Abydos King List:
Sneferka Anu
Snfr-k3 ˁnw
Anu has perfected his Ka
< O34 D28 F35 D36 n W24 G43 >
- Died: c. 2170 BC
- Dynasty: 8th Dynasty

Neferkamin Anu (died c. 2170 BC) was a king of ancient Egypt during the First Intermediate Period (2181–2055 BC). According to the Abydos King List and the latest reconstruction of the Turin canon by Kim Ryholt, he was the 13th king of the Eighth Dynasty. This opinion is shared by the Egyptologists Jürgen Beckerath, Thomas Schneider, and Darrell Baker. As a king of the Eighth Dynasty, Neferkamin Anu would have reigned over the Memphite region.

== Attestations ==
Neferkamin Anu is mentioned on the entry 52 of the Abydos King list, which was compiled in the early Ramesside period. The list names his predecessor as Neferkare Pepiseneb and his successor as Qakare Ibi. The Turin canon identifies Nerferkamin Anu with a Nefer mentioned on column 4, line 10 of the document, which is in agreement with the Abydos king list. Any detail about Neferkamin Anu's reign is lost in a lacuna of the Turin canon.

== Name ==
The name of Neferkamin Anu is transliterated as Neferkamin Anu even though it is reported as Sneferka Anu on the Abydos King list. The reason for this transliteration is that the hieroglyph sign O34, reading s, could replace the sign R22 for the god Min and reading Mn.

Preceded by Possibly Pepiseneb	King of Egypt c. 2171 – c. 2170 BC	Succeeded by Possibly Ibi
