= Neferkamin =

Egyptian pharaoh

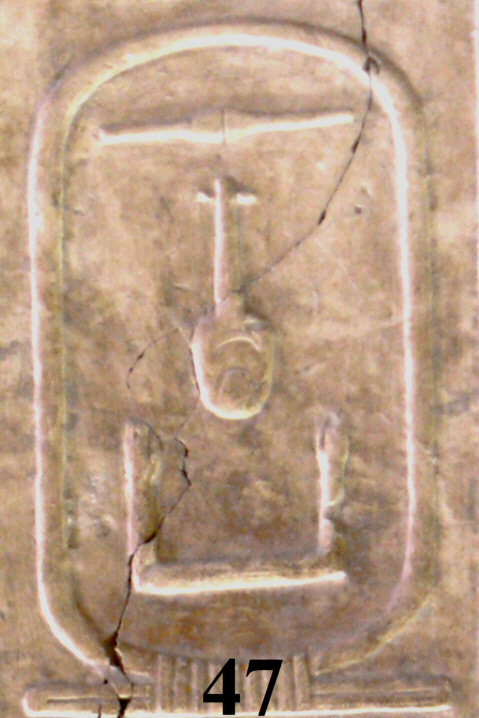
- The cartouche of Neferkamin on the Abydos King List reading Sneferka

Pharaoh
- Reign: c. 2190 – c. 2188 BC
- Predecessor: Possibly Merenhor
- Successor: Possibly Nikare
Royal titulary
Prenomen
Neferkamin
nfr k3 mnw
Perfect is the Ka of Min
M23 t L2 t < R22 nfr D28 >
Abydos King List
Sneferka
S.nfr k3
My Ka is perfect/He has perfected my Ka
M23 t L2 t < O34 nfr D28 >
- Died: c. 2188 BC

Neferkamin (died c. 2188 BC) may have been an Eighth Dynasty king of ancient Egypt during the First Intermediate Period.

His throne name "Sneferka" is only attested on the Abydos King List (n. 47) although it is possible that here the name is mistyped, and the O34 hieroglyph ("s") in fact is a R22 ("min"), hence "Neferkamin". The correct reading of this king's name is provided, along with the name of Nikare, on a gold plaque now in the British Museum; however, it has been suggested that this object could be a forgery.

Neferkamin is absent from the Turin canon as a large lacuna in this document affects most kings of the 7th/8th Dynasty. No contemporary document or building with his name has been found.
