= Ninth Dynasty of Egypt =

Ancient Egyptian dynasty

- c. 2160 BC–c. 2130 BC
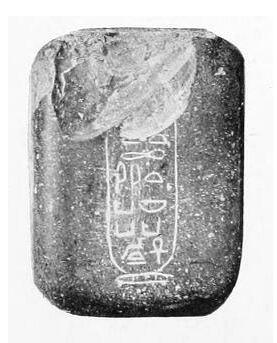
- Jasper weight with the cartouche of Nebkaure Khety
- Capital: Herakleopolis Magna
- Common languages: Egyptian language
- Religion: ancient Egyptian religion
- Government: Absolute monarchy
- Historical era: Bronze Age
  - Established: c. 2160 BC
  - Disestablished: c. 2130 BC
Preceded by	Succeeded by
Seventh Dynasty of Egypt; Eighth Dynasty of Egypt	Tenth Dynasty of Egypt

The Ninth Dynasty of ancient Egypt (Dynasty IX) is often combined with the 7th, 8th, 10th and early 11th Dynasties under the group title First Intermediate Period. The dynasty that seems to have supplanted the Eighth Dynasty is extremely obscure. The takeover by the rulers of Herakleopolis Magna was violent and is reflected in Manetho's description of Achthoes, the founder of the dynasty, as 'more terrible than his predecessors', who 'wrought evil things for those in all Egypt".

== Rulers ==
The Ninth Dynasty was founded at Herakleopolis Magna, and the Tenth Dynasty continued there. At this time Egypt was not unified, and there is some overlap between these and other local dynasties. The Turin Canon lists eighteen kings for this royal line, but their names are damaged, unidentifiable, or lost.

The following is a possible list of rulers of the Ninth Dynasty based on the Turin Canon, as egyptologists have differing opinions about the order of succession within the two dynasties. Among them, only Meryibre Khety and Nebkaure Khety are undoubtedly attested by archaeological finds:

Dynasty IX (according to Hayes) (c. 2160 - c. 2130 BC)
Name	Image	Comments
Meryibre Khety I		Manetho's Achthoes, a nomarch who proclaimed himself king
Name lost		
Neferkare VII		Might be the Kaneferre mentioned in the tomb of the nomarch Ankhtifi
Nebkaure Khety II		Also mentioned in The Eloquent Peasant tale
Setut		
Name lost		
Mery[...]		
Shed[...]		
H[...]		
Name lost		
Name lost		
Name lost		
User(?)[...]		
Imhotep		Ephemeral ruler of the Ninth Dynasty. Only known from two rock inscriptions in the Wadi Hammamat. Correct chronological position unknown.

Preceded by Eighth Dynasty	Dynasty of Egypt c. 2160 – c. 2130 BC	Succeeded by Tenth Dynasty
