= Nikare =

Egyptian pharaoh

Nikare I
- Nykare
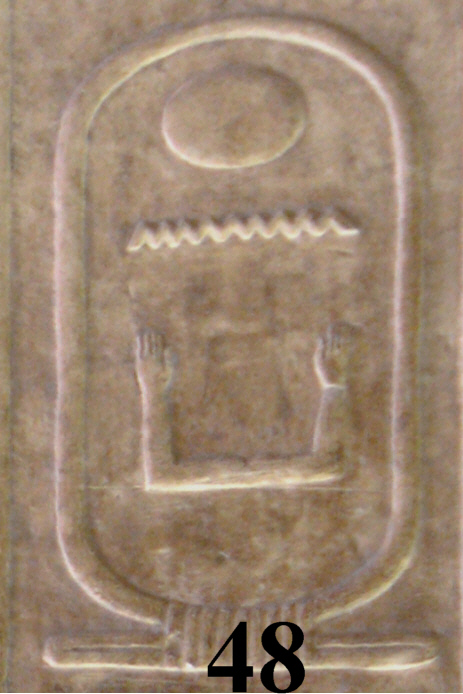
- The cartouche of Nikare on the Abydos King List.

Pharaoh
- Reign: Unknown
- Predecessor: Neferkamin
- Successor: Neferkare Tereru
Royal titulary
Prenomen
Nikare
N-k3-rˁ
He belongs to the Ka of Ra
M23 t n < N5 n D28 >
- Dynasty: Eighth Dynasty

Nikare (also Nikare I) may have been an ancient Egyptian pharaoh of the Eighth Dynasty during the early First Intermediate Period (2181–2055 BC), at a time when Egypt was possibly divided between several polities. According to the Egyptologists Kim Ryholt, Jürgen von Beckerath and Darrell Baker he was the ninth king of the Eighth Dynasty. As such, Nikare's seat of power would have been Memphis.

== Attestations ==
Nikare is only known for certain thanks to the Abydos King List, a king list redacted during the reign of Seti I, where his name appears on the 48th entry. Nikare may also have been mentioned on the Turin canon but his name and duration of reign are lost to a large lacuna affecting kings 2 through 11 of the Eighth Dynasty.

== Artefacts ==
According to the Egyptologist Peter Kaplony, a single faience cylinder-seal may possibly bear Nikare's name, and could thus be the only contemporary attestation of this king.

A gold plaque, now in the British Museum, is inscribed with his name along with that of Neferkamin; however, it has been suggested that this object could be a modern forgery.

Preceded by Neferkamin	Pharaoh of Egypt; Eighth Dynasty	Succeeded by Neferkare Tereru
