= Neferkare Neby =

Egyptian pharaoh

- Neferkare III
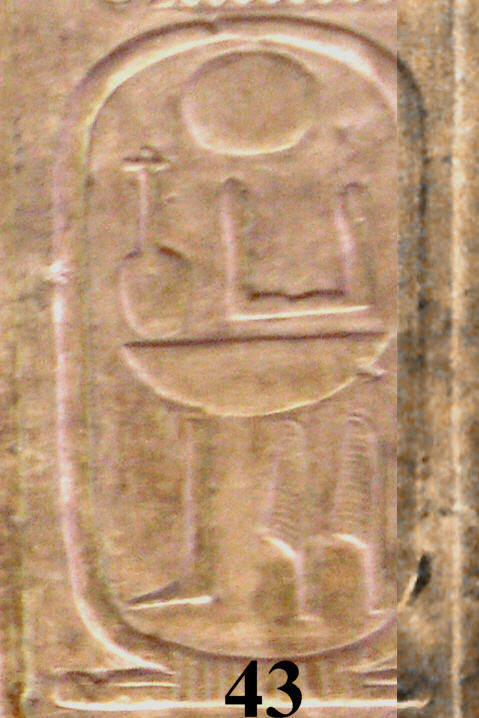
- The cartouche of Neferkare Neby on the Abydos King List

Pharaoh
- Reign: c. 2198 – c. 2196 BC
- Predecessor: Possibly Neferkare II
- Successor: Possibly Djedkare Shemai
Royal titulary
Prenomen
Neferkare Neby
Nfr-k3-rˁ nbjj
Perfect is the Ka of Ra, the protector< N5 nfr D28 V30 D58 i i >
Nomen
Neferkare
Nfr-k3-rˁ
Perfect is the Ka of Ra< N5 nfr D28 >
- Father: Possibly Pepi II or Merenre Nemtyemsaf I
- Mother: Possibly Ankhesenpepi II
- Died: c. 2196 BC
- Burial: Pyramid "Neferkare Neby is Enduring of Life", presumably at Saqqara
- Dynasty: 7th or 8th Dynasty

Neferkare Neby (also Neferkare III; died c. 2196 BC) was an ancient Egyptian king of the Seventh or Eighth Dynasty during the early First Intermediate Period (2181–2055 BC). According to Egyptologists Jürgen Beckerath and Darrell Baker, he was the fourth king of the Seventh dynasty, as he appears as the fourth king in the Abydos King List within the list of kings assigned to this dynasty.

Neferkare Neby's name is clearly readable on the Abydos King List (number 43), and unlike most kings of this period, is attested by a further two contemporary sources. Indeed, Neferkare Neby's name appears on the false door at Ankhesenpepi II's tomb, and is also inscribed on her sarcophagus. These attestations show that Neferkare Neby's mother was possibly Queen Ankhesenpepi II, which would presumably make his father Merenre Nemtyemsaf I. The stele of Ankhesenpepi II records that Neferkare Neby begun the construction of a pyramid, possibly at Saqqara and named him as Ḏd-ˁnḫ Nfr-k3-rˁ nbjj, that is Djedankh Neferkare Neby and which means "Neferkare Neby is Enduring of Life". The location of the pyramid is unknown and it most probably never significantly entered the building stage.

Like many kings of the Eighth Dynasty, Neferkare Neby is absent from the Turin canon as a large lacuna affects the location where his name would have been listed.

== See also ==
- List of pharaohs
