= Neferkare Tereru =

Egyptian pharaoh

- Neferkare V
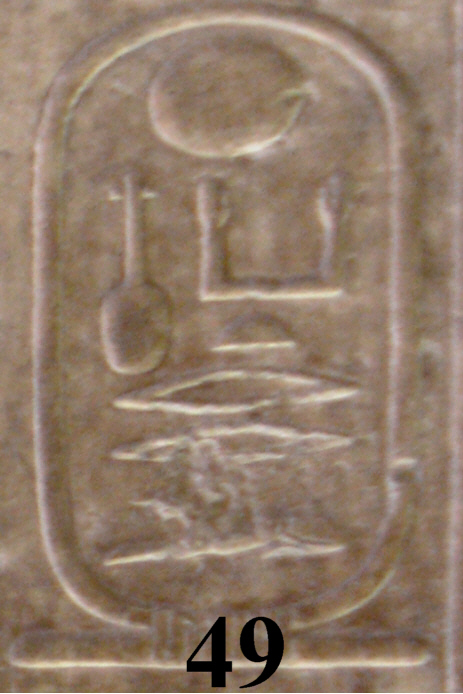
- The cartouche of Neferkare Tereru on the Abydos King List

Pharaoh
- Reign: c. 2186 – c. 2184 BC
- Predecessor: Possibly Nikare
- Successor: Possibly Neferkahor
Royal titulary
Prenomen
Neferkare Tereru
nfr k3 rˁ tr(r)rw
Perfect is the Ka of Ra, the respected one

M23 X1 L2 X1	N5 nfr D28 X1 r r E23
- Died: c. 2184 BC

Neferkare Tereru (also Neferkare V; died c. 2184 BC) may have been an Eighth Dynasty king of ancient Egypt during the First Intermediate Period. His name is only attested on the Abydos King List (no. 49). Neferkare Tereru is absent from the Turin canon as a large lacuna in this document affects most kings of the 7th/8th Dynasty. No contemporary document or building with his name has been found.
