= Neferkare II =

Egyptian pharaoh

- Neferkara
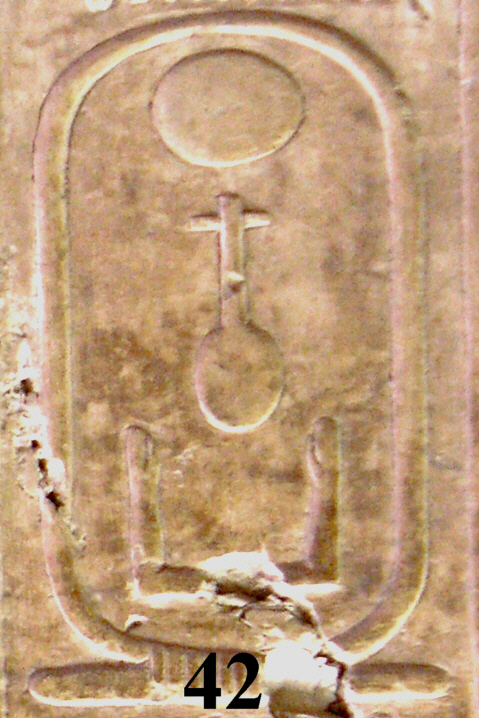
- The cartouche of Neferkare II on the Abydos King List.

Pharaoh
- Reign: unknown duration
- Predecessor: Menkare
- Successor: Neferkare Neby
Royal titulary
Prenomen
Neferkare
Nfr-k3 rˁ
Perfect is the Ka of Ra< N5 nfr D28 >
- Dynasty: Eighth Dynasty

Neferkare II was an ancient Egyptian pharaoh of the Eighth Dynasty during the early First Intermediate Period (2181–2055 BC). According to the Egyptologists Kim Ryholt, Jürgen von Beckerath and Darell Baker he was the third king of the Eighth Dynasty. As a pharaoh of the Eighth Dynasty, Neferkare II's capital would have been Memphis.

== Attestation ==
Neferkare II is only attested through his name, which given on the 42nd entry of the Abydos King List. The Abydos king list was redacted some 900 years after the First intermediate period during the reign of Seti I. Another king list of the Ramesside era, the Turin canon has a large lacuna affecting many kings of the Eighth Dynasty and the duration of Neferkare II's reign, which would have been reported on the document, is lost.

== Identity ==
Jürgen von Beckerath tentatively identified Neferkare II with the prenomen Wadjkare ("Flourishing is the Ka of Ra"), which is attested on a graffito from the Wadi Hammamat contemporary with First Intermediate Period. This identification is seemingly rejected by Baker who makes no mention of any attestion for Neferkare II beyond the Abydos king list, while Thomas Schneider relates Wadjkare to either Neferkare II or Neferirkare II.

Preceded by Menkare?	Pharaoh of Egypt; Eighth Dynasty?	Succeeded by Neferkare Neby?
