= Menkare =

Egyptian pharaoh

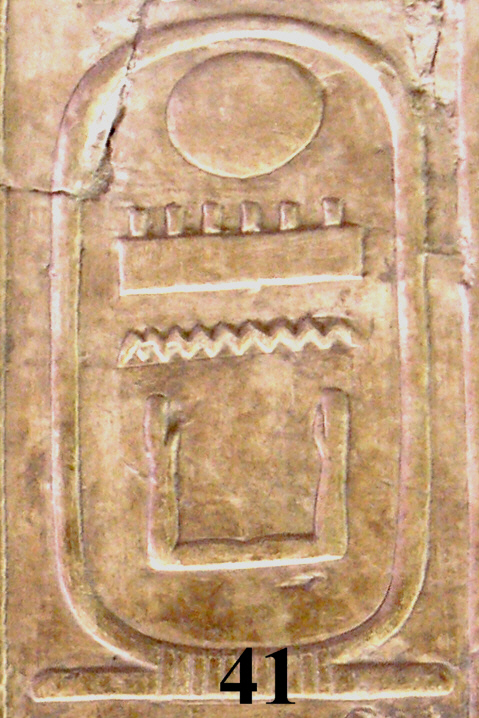
- The cartouche of Menkare on the Abydos King List.

Pharaoh
- Reign: Probably short, c. 2181 BC
- Predecessor: Netjerkare Siptah
- Successor: Neferkare II
Royal titulary
Prenomen
Menkare
Mn k3 Rˁ
Stable is the Ka of Ra
M23 t n < N5 Y5 N35 D28 >
- Dynasty: Eighth Dynasty

Menkare was an ancient Egyptian pharaoh, the first or second ruler of the Eighth Dynasty. Menkare probably reigned a short time at the transition between the Old Kingdom period and the First Intermediate Period, in the early 22nd century BC. The rapid succession of brief reigns at the time suggests times of hardship, possibly related to a widespread aridification of the Middle East, known as the 4.2 kiloyear event. As a pharaoh of the Eighth Dynasty, according to Manetho, Menkare's seat of power would have been Memphis.

== Attestations ==
Historical source

Menkare's only secure historical source is the Abydos king list, a list of kings redacted during the reign of Seti I for religious purposes and which today serves as the primary historical source for kings of the early First Intermediate Period. The praenomen Menkare appears on the 41st entry of the list. Another king list redacted during the early Ramesside period, the Turin canon, may have listed Menkare as well. Unfortunately, a large lacuna affects the papyrus of the canon where Menkare's name would have been listed.

Contemporaneous source

The tomb of queen Neit in South Saqqara houses a relief showing the queen in front of a damaged royal cartouche. The Egyptologist Percy Newberry proposed that the cartouche reads Menkare, which would thus be the sole contemporaneous attestation for this king having survived to this day. This opinion is shared by Gae Callender, who reexamined Jéquier's plates of the inscription.

A source from a later period

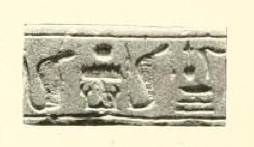
Cylinder seal referring either to Menkare or to Menkaure of the 4th Dynasty.

Another possible, though not contemporaneous, attestation of Menkare is a cylinder seal made of glazed steatite, now in the British Museum under the catalog number 30557, and inscribed with the text "The Good God, Lord of the Two Lands, Menkare". The seal dates to the 26th Dynasty, some 1700 years after Menkare's lifetime. The attribution of the seal to Menkare is unlikely: given that Menkare is a rather obscure king, some scholars have suggested instead that the seal bears a mistake and actually refers to the better known pharaoh Menkaure, builder of the third pyramid of Giza.

== Refuted identification with Nitocris ==
In an old hypothesis, the Egyptologist Flinders Petrie suggested that Menkare should be equated with queen Nitocris, a legendary figure appearing in Herodotus' Histories and Manetho's Aegyptiaca and who is believed to have lived close to Menkare's lifetime. Petrie based his hypothesis on the fact that Nitocris is credited with the construction of the third pyramid of Giza by Manetho. Since this pyramid was in fact built by Menkaure, Petrie surmised that Manetho fell victim to a tradition which had confused Menkare and Menkaure. Similarly, the seal would seem to be another manifestation of this confusion. Petrie's hypothesis has been thoroughly disproven by modern analyses of the Turin canon however, and Nitocris is now known to originate from the names of the real ruler Netjerkare Siptah. The attribution of the seal remains uncertain.

Preceded by Netjerkare Siptah	Pharaoh of Egypt; Eighth Dynasty	Succeeded by Neferkare II
