= Neferkare Khendu =

Egyptian pharaoh

- Neferkare IV
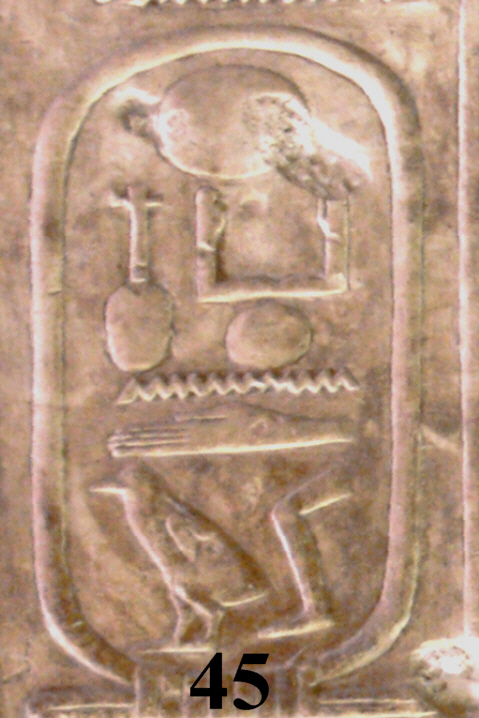
- The cartouche of Neferkare Khendu on the Abydos King List

Pharaoh
- Reign: c. 2194 – c. 2192 BC
- Predecessor: Possibly Djedkare Shemai
- Successor: Possibly Merenhor
Royal titulary
Prenomen
Neferkare Khendu
nfr k3 rˁ ḫndw
Perfect is the Ka of Ra, he who treads

M23 X1 L2 X1	ra nfr kA x n d w gH
- Died: c. 2192 BC

Neferkare Khendu (also Neferkare IV; died c. 2192 BC) was an ancient Egyptian king of the Eighth Dynasty during the early First Intermediate Period (2181–2055 BC). According to the Egyptologists Kim Ryholt, Jürgen Beckerath, and Darrell Baker, he was the sixth king of the Eighth Dynasty.

Neferkare Khendu's name is attested on the Abydos King List (number 45), a king list dating to the Ramesside-era, and is absent from the Turin canon as a large lacuna in this document affects most kings of the 7th/8th Dynasty.

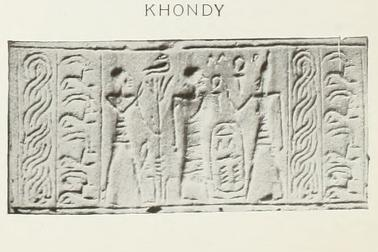
Cylinder seal with the cartouche "Khamudi", tentatively attributed to Neferkare Khendu by Henri Frankfort

No attestation is firmly attributable to Neferkare Khendu beyond the Abydos king list, although a cylinder seal inscribed with the cartouche Ḫndy, "Khendy", has been tentatively attributed to him by the egyptologist Henri Frankfort in 1926. Modern scholarship has shown however that the cartouche on the seal is most likely to read "Khamudi", name of the last king of the Hyksos, and furthermore that this cartouche was inserted on the seal as a space filler rather than as an explicit reference to this king. The seal is now in the Petrie Museum, catalog number UC 11616.
