= Neheri I =

Ancient Egyptian Nomarch

- Nomarch of the 15th nome of Upper Egypt
- Dynasty: 11th Dynasty to 12th Dynasty
- Burial: No. 4, Deir el-Bersha
- Father: Djehtynakht
- Mother: Kemi

Neheri I (the ordinal is modern) was a local governor of the fifteenth nome of Upper Egypt ("the Hare nome") during the Eleventh dynasty or/and early Twelfth Dynasty, c. 2000 BC. His exact date is disputed. His titles are preserved in several inscriptions at Hatnub. According to that he was great overlord of the Hare nome, but also bears the title of a vizier. The vizier's titles appear only once while the governor's titles are common in all his inscriptions.

Neheri is known from his decorated rock cut tomb at Deir el-Bersha (no. 4). His tomb was found heavily destroyed. Its rock cut chapel consist of two rooms. Only fragmments of the wall decoration were preserved when the tomb was recorded at the end of the 19th century. No titles of Neheri are preserved. The mother of Neheri, Kemi is mentioned, as well as two sonsː Kay and Djehutynakht. The latter might be identical to Djehutynakht (10A), while Kay became a vizier.

Neheri I is also known from a high number of inscriptions found in the quarries at Hatnub. Several of them are dated to the reign of the governor and not to the reign of the ruling king (although this point is under discussion). Some of the inscriptions refer to wars indicating civil wars in the early Middle Kingdom.
