= Meru, Bebi =

Ancient Egyptian Nomarch

- Nomarch of the 15th nome of Upper Egypt
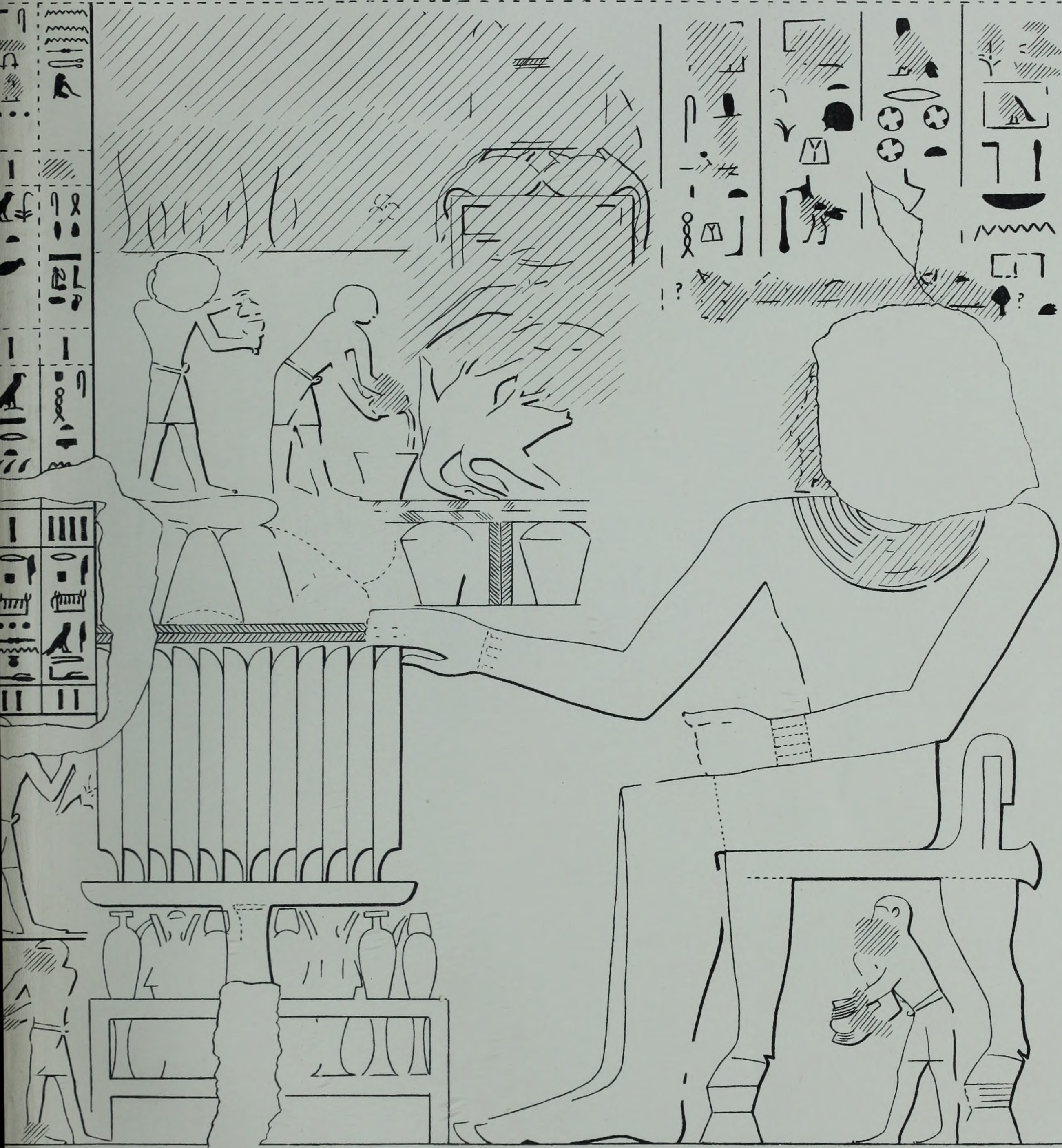
- Meru, Bebi shown in his tomb
- Dynasty: 6th Dynasty
- Burial: 20, El Sheikh Sa'id

Meru, with the second name ̪(beautiful name) Bebi was a local governor of the fifteenth nome of Upper Egypt ("the Hare nome") in the Sixth dynasty, c. 2300 BC. He was the successor of Wiu, Iyu as local governor in the Hare nome. He might date under king Pepi II.

Meru is mainly known from his decorated rock cut tomb at El Sheikh Sa'id, that was found heavily damaged. The inscriptions in the tomb chapel preserve his titles, according to that he was royal sealer, sole friend, ruler of the estate, overseer of the new towns, overseer of Upper Egypt, but also ruler of the estate of Teti and ruler of the estate of Pepy. Meru was married to a woman called Henhenet, who had a huge own tomb at El Sheikh Sa'id.
