= Coffin Texts =

Collection of ancient Egyptian funerary spells

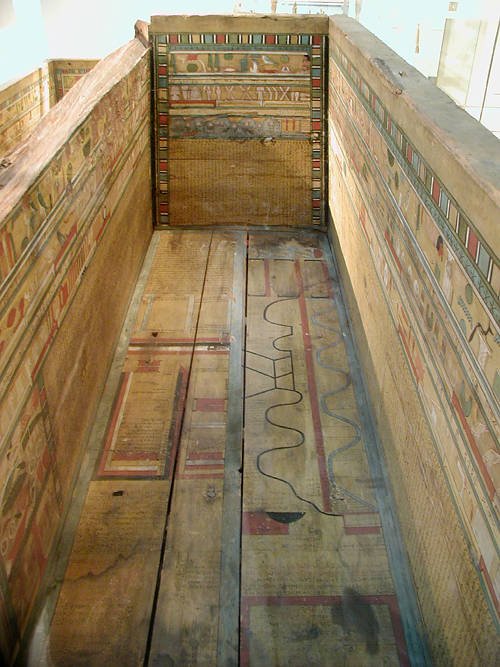
Middle Kingdom coffin with the Coffin Texts painted on its panels

The Coffin Texts are a collection of ancient Egyptian funerary spells written on Ancient Egyptian coffins beginning in the First Intermediate Period. They are partially derived from the earlier Pyramid Texts, reserved for royal use only, but contain substantial new material related to everyday desires, indicating a new target audience of common people. Coffin texts are dated back to 2100 BCE. Ordinary Egyptians who could afford a coffin had access to these funerary spells and the pharaoh no longer had exclusive rights to an afterlife.

As the modern name of this collection of some 1,185 spells implies, they were mostly inscribed on Middle Kingdom coffins. They were also sometimes written on tomb walls, stelae, canopic chests, papyri and mummy masks. Due to the limited writing surfaces of some of these objects, the spells were often abbreviated, giving rise to long and short versions, some of which were later copied in the Book of the Dead.

== Content ==
In contrast to the Pyramid Texts which focus on the celestial realm, the coffin texts emphasize the subterranean elements of the afterlife ruled by the deity Osiris, in a place called the Duat. An Osirian afterlife is offered to everyone, and the deceased is even referred to as "the Osiris-[name]." This subterranean realm is described as being filled with threatening beings, traps, and snares with which the deceased must contend. The spells in the Coffin Texts allow the deceased to protect themselves against these dangers and "dying a second death".

A new theme recorded in the coffin texts is the notion that all people will be judged by Osiris and his council according to their deeds in life. The texts allude to the use of a balance, which became the pivotal moment of judgment in the later Book of the Dead. The texts address common fears of the living, such as having to do manual labor, with spells to allow the deceased to avoid these unpleasant tasks.

They combine ritual actions intended as protection, expressions of aspiration for a blessed existence after death and of the transformations and transmigrations of the ba and akh and so on. In addition there are descriptions of the land of the dead, its landscape and inhabitants. These include the Sekhet Hotep (Field of offerings or peace), the paths of Rostau and the abode of Osiris.

=== Examples ===
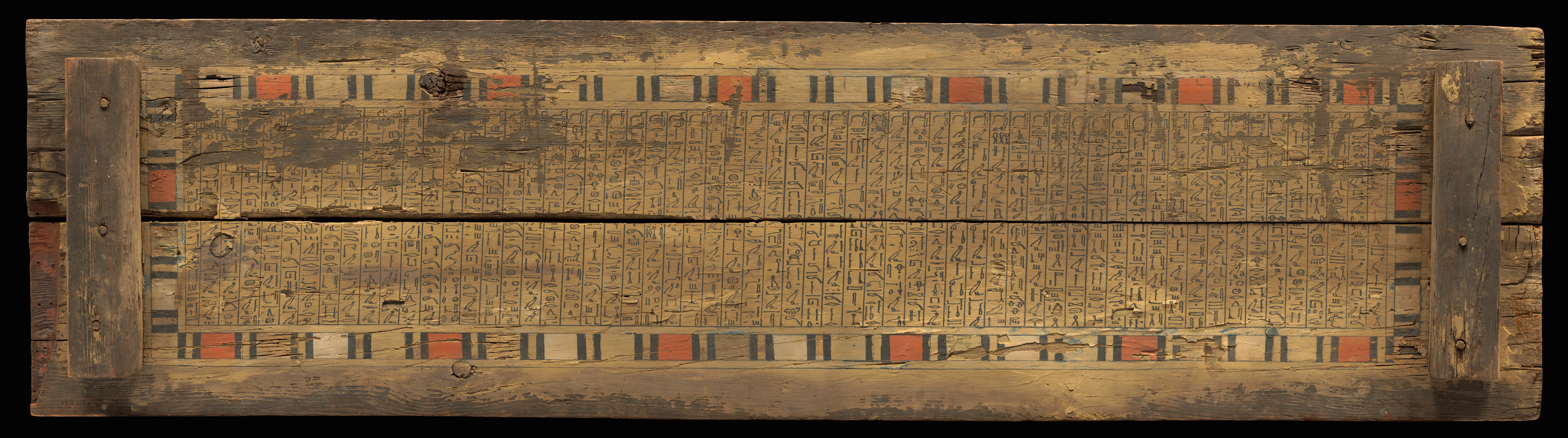
Dismantled coffin of Khety c. 1919–1800 BCE with Coffin Text spells painted on the inside panels

Coffin text 1130 is a speech by the sun god Ra, who says:

Hail in peace! I repeat to you the good deeds which my own heart did for me from within the serpent-coil, in order to silence strife ...
I made the four winds, that every man might breathe in his time ...
I made the great inundation, that the humble might benefit by it like the great ...
I made every man like his fellow; and I did not command that they do wrong. It is their hearts which disobey what I have said ...
I have created the gods from my sweat, and the people from the tears of my eye.

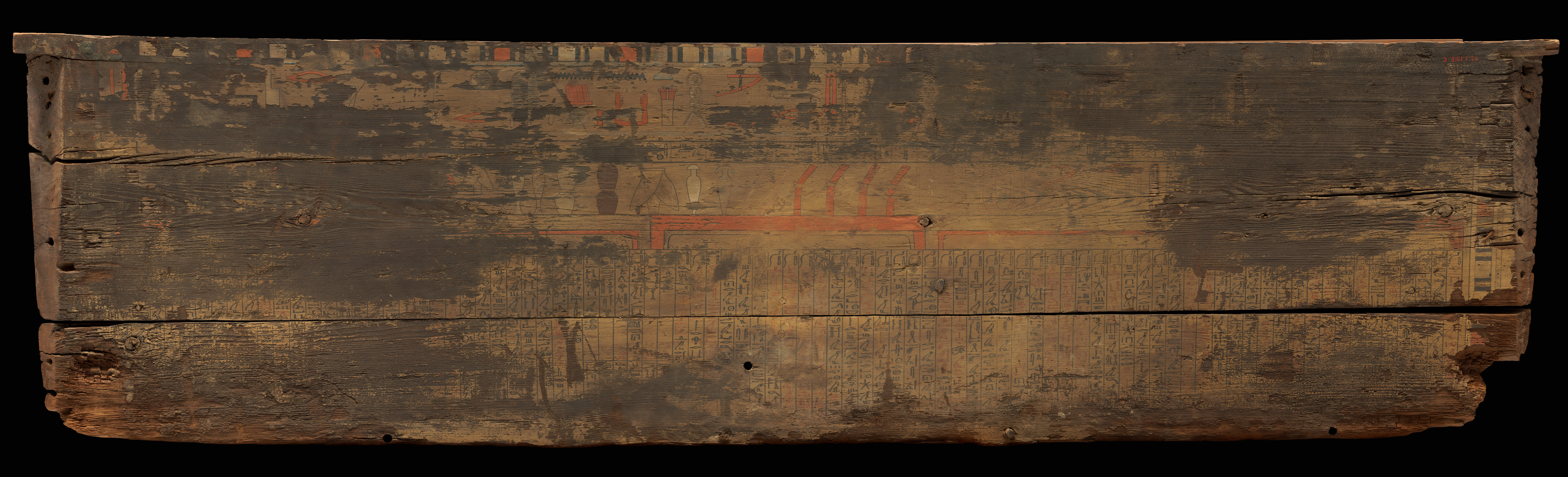
Dismantled coffin of Khety c. 1919–1800 BCE with Coffin Text spells painted on the inside panels

Coffin text 1031 is spoken by the deceased, who replies:

I shall sail rightly in my bark, I am lord of eternity in the crossing of the sky.
I am not afraid in my limbs, for Hu and Hike overthrow for me that evil being.
I shall see light-land, I shall dwell in it ...
Make way for me, that I may see Nun and Amun! For I am that Akh who passes by the guards ...
I am equipped and effective in opening his portal!
As for any person who knows this spell, he will be like Re in the eastern sky, like Osiris in the netherworld. He will go down to the circle of fire, without the flame touching him ever!

== The Book of Two Ways ==
A few coffins from the Middle Egyptian necropolis of el-Bersheh (Deir El Bersha) contain unique graphical representations of the realm of the afterlife, along with spells related to the journey of the deceased through the Duat. This collection, called the Book of Two Ways, was the first example of an Ancient Egyptian map of the underworld. The Book of Two Ways is a precursor to the New Kingdom books of the underworld as well as the Book of the Dead, in which descriptions of the routes through the afterlife are a persistent theme. The two ways depicted are the land and water routes, separated by a lake of fire, that lead to Rostau and the abode of Osiris. The oldest copy currently known belonged to a woman named Ankh who lived during the reign of the nomarch Ahanakht I.

== See also ==
- Ancient Egyptian afterlife beliefs
- Ancient Egyptian funerary texts

== Bibliography ==
- Raymond O. Faulkner, "The Ancient Egyptian Coffin Texts", ISBN 0-85668-754-5, 3 vols., 1972–78.
- The Ancient Egyptian Books of the Afterlife, Erik Hornung, ISBN 0-8014-8515-0
- The Egyptian Coffin Texts, edited by Adriaan de Buck and Alan Gardiner and published by the University of Chicago Oriental Institute
  - Volume 1, Texts of Spells 1-75
  - Volume 2, Texts of Spells 76-163
  - Volume 3, Texts of Spells 164-267
  - Volume 4, Texts of Spells 268-354
  - Volume 5, Texts of Spells 355-471
  - Volume 6, Texts of Spells 472-787
  - Volume 7, Texts of Spells 787-1185
  - Volume 8, Middle Kingdom Copies of Pyramid Texts
