= Djehutynakht =

Djehutynakht can refer to multiple nomarchs of the Hare or Hermopolite nome of Ancient Egypt.

- Djehutynakht I
- Djehutynakht II
- Djehutynakht III
- Djehutynakht (10A) (Djehutynakht IV or V)
- Djehutynakht VI
