= Serefka =

Ancient Egyptian Nomarch

Serefka (my Ka is careful)
- Nomarch of the 15th nome of Upper Egypt
- Dynasty: 5th Dynasty
- Burial: 24, El Sheikh Sa'id

Serefka was a local governor of the fifteenth nome of Upper Egypt ("the Hare nome") in the Fifth dynasty, c. 2400 BC. His son and successor was Werirni (tomb no. 25 at El Sheikh Sa'id). Werirni is depicted in the tomb chapel of Serefka.

Serefka is mainly known from his decorated rock cut tomb at El Sheikh Sa'id, that was found heavily damaged. The inscriptions in the tomb chapel preserve his titles, according to that he was overseer of the duties, overseer of the estates, overseer of the new towns, overseer of the middle provinces of Upper Egypt, Priest of Khufu, priest of Userkaf, and leader of the Hare nome (the latter was the title of a local governor before the end of the Old Kingdom).
