= Neheri II =

Ancient Egyptian Nomarch

- Nomarch of the 15th nome of Upper Egypt
- Dynasty: 12th Dynasty
- Burial: 17K77, Deir el-Bersha
- Father: Kay (?)

Neheri II (the counting is modern) was a local governor of the fifteenth nome of Upper Egypt ("the Hare nome") during the Twelfth dynasty, c. 1950 BC under the kings Amenemhat I or/and Senusret I.

Neheri is known from his decorated rock cut tomb at Deir el-Bersha (17K77, old no. 7). His tomb was found heavily destroyed. Its rock cut chapel consist of a single room. Only fragmments with texts from the ceiiing are preserved. A short biographical note says, that Neheri overthrow a rebellion. He bears the titles governor (Haty-a), leader of the two thrones and overseer of priests.

His son was perhaps Djehutynakht VI buried in tomb 1 at Berheh. His wife was a women called Zathedjethetep, who was the mother of Djehutynakht. His father was a person called Kay. The latter is not mentioned in Neheri's tomb but is the grandfather of Djehutynakht.
