= Ahanakht I =

Ancient Egyptian Nomarch

- Nomarch of the 15th nome of Upper Egypt
- Dynasty: 11th Dynasty
- Burial: 17K85/1, Deir el-Bersha
- Father: Djehutynakht

Ahanakht I (Aha is strong, the counting is modern) was a local governor of the fifteenth nome of Upper Egypt ("the Hare nome") during the Eleventh dynasty, c. 2000 BC. He was most likely the first Middle Kingdom governor of this province.

Ahanakht is known from his decorated rock cut tomb at Deir el-Bersha (old no. 5; now 17K85/1). and from inscriptions in the quarries of Hatnub. The latter belong to lower officials who refer in the texts to their governor.

The tomb of Ahanakht is much destroyed, but several important inscriptions are preserved. They preserve many of Ahanakht's title. According to that he was great overlord of the Hare nome, but also bears the title of a vizier. The vizier's titles appear only once in his tomb chapel while the governor's titles are common in all his inscriptions. According to the inscriptions there, he was the son of a certain Djehutynakht. The latter was perhaps governor too, but is this not confirmed by any title. One of the inscriptions at Hatnub belonging to Ahanakht I is dated to a year 30. It is unclear whether this means that Ahanakht I was 30 years in office or whether he dated the inscriptions to the reign of a king, most likely Mentuhotep II.
