= Werirni =

Ancient Egyptian Nomarch

- Nomarch of the 15th nome of Upper Egypt
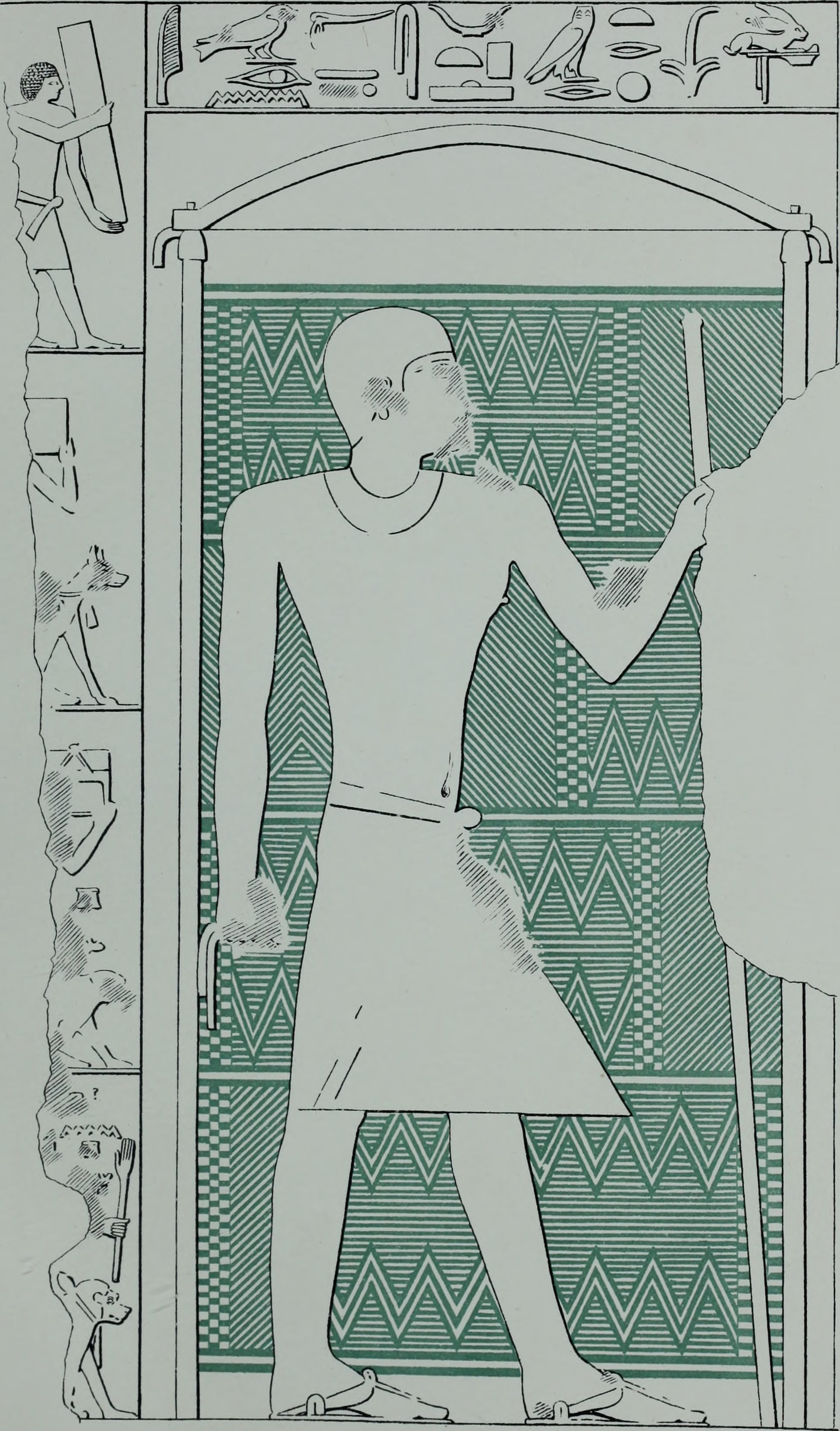
- Figure of Werirni in his tomb
- Dynasty: 5th Dynasty
- Burial: 25, El Sheikh Sa'id
- Father: Serefka

Werirni was a local governor of the fifteenth nome of Upper Egypt ("the Hare nome") at the end of the Fifth dynasty, c. 2500 BC.

Werirni is mainly known from his decorated rock cut tomb at El Sheikh Sa'id. The inscriptions in the tomb chapel preserve his titles, according to that he was ruler of the great domain, overseer of the commissions, overseer of the new towns and priest of Niuserre. The first titles are typical for local governors of the 5th Dynasty. The priestly title provides evidence that he lived not before king Niuserre.

In the tomb of Serefka at El Sheikh Sa'id (tomb no. 24) appears the eldest son of the tomb owner with the name Werirni. It is likely that this is the same person as the owner of tomb 25.
