= Hare nome =

Administrative division in ancient Egypt

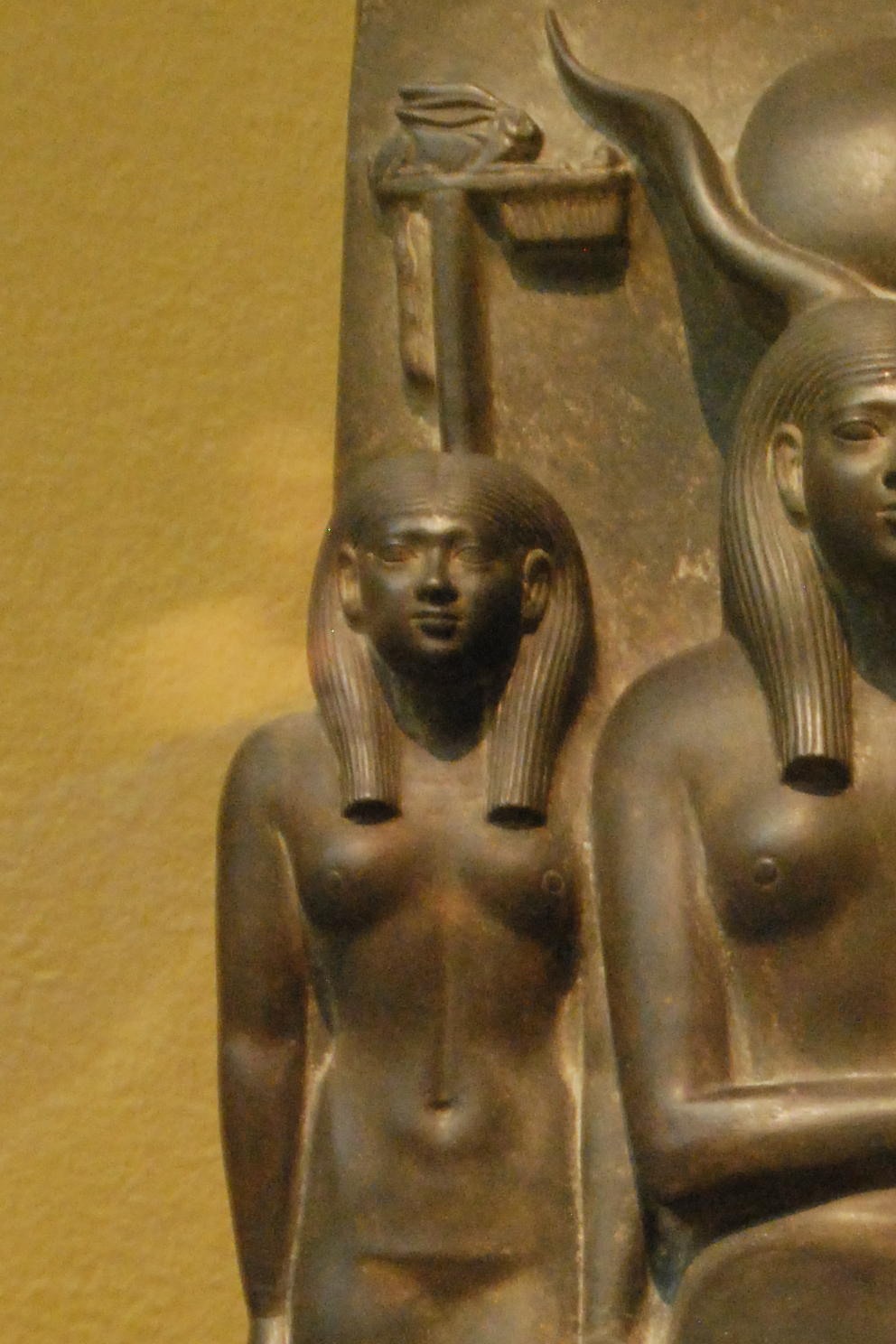
The deified Hare nome; closeup of a statue group of pharaoh Menkaure, Fourth Dynasty of Egypt

The Hare nome, also called the Hermopolite nome (Ancient Egyptian: wnt "Cape hare") was one of the 42 nomoi (administrative divisions) in ancient Egypt; more precisely, it was the 15th nome of Upper Egypt.

The Hare nome's main city was Khemenu (later Hermopolis Magna, and the modern el-Ashmunein) in Middle Egypt. The local main deity was Thoth, though the inscriptions on the White Chapel of Senusret I link this nome with the cult of Bes and Unut.

== History ==
The Hare nome was already recognized during the 4th Dynasty of the Old Kingdom as shown by the triad statue of pharaoh Menkaure, Hathor, and an anthropomorphized-deified depiction of the nome. It is known that during the 6th Dynasty its nomarchs were buried in the necropolis of El-Sheikh Sa'id.
The nome kept its importance during the First Intermediate Period and the subsequent Middle Kingdom; its governors were also responsible of the alabaster quarrying at Hatnub in the Eastern Desert, they owned exclusive offices such as "director of the double throne" and great one of the five", and also were high priests of Thot. Since the First Intermediate Period, they moved slightly northward their official necropolis to Deir el-Bersha, where their remarkable though poorly preserved rock-cut tombs were excavated. During the Middle Kingdom, the Hare nome was ruled by a rather branched dynasty of nomarchs usually named Ahanakht, Djehutynakht, or Neheri. The last known among them, Djehutihotep, was also the owner of the most elaborate and preserved tomb of the Deir el-Bersha necropolis; he ruled until the early reign of Senusret III, who is known to have put into action serious steps to minimize the power held by all nomarchs.
During the Second Intermediate Period the Hare nome assimilated the neighboring Oryx nome (16th of Upper Egypt).

== Nomarchs of the Hare nome ==
=== Old Kingdom ===
This is a list of the known nomarchs, dating to the Old Kingdom. They were buried at El-Sheikh Sa'id.

- Serefka (5th Dynasty)
- Werirni (5th Dynasty, son of Serefka)
- Teti-ankh/Iymhotep (6th Dynasty, perhaps Pepy I)
- Meru, Bebi (6th Dynasty, perhaps Pepy I)
- Khuu (tomb not known, attested in an inscription from Hatnub.
- Wiu, Iyu (6th Dynasty, perhaps Pepy I; son of Meru/Bebi)
- Meru (6th Dynasty, perhaps Pepy II, son of Wiu/Iyu)

=== Middle Kingdom ===
The following is a genealogy of the nomarchs of the Hare nome during the late 11th and 12th Dynasty (the limit between the two dynasties passes approximately along the third generation). The nomarchs are underlined. They were buried at Dayr al-Barsha.

Djehutynakht
Ahanakht I
Ahanakht II	Djehutynakht IV
Hathorhotep♀	Djehutynakht VI

Kay
Djehutynakht III	Kema♀
Djehutynakht♀	Neheri I	Djehutyhotep♀
Kay	Djehutynakht V	Djehutynakht♀
Sathedjhotep♀	Neheri II
Amenemhat	Neheri	Kay	Satkheperka♀
Hathorhotep♀	Djehutyhotep
(many children, but no nomarchs)
