= Wiu, Iyu =

Ancient Egyptian Nomarch

- Nomarch of the 15th nome of Upper Egypt
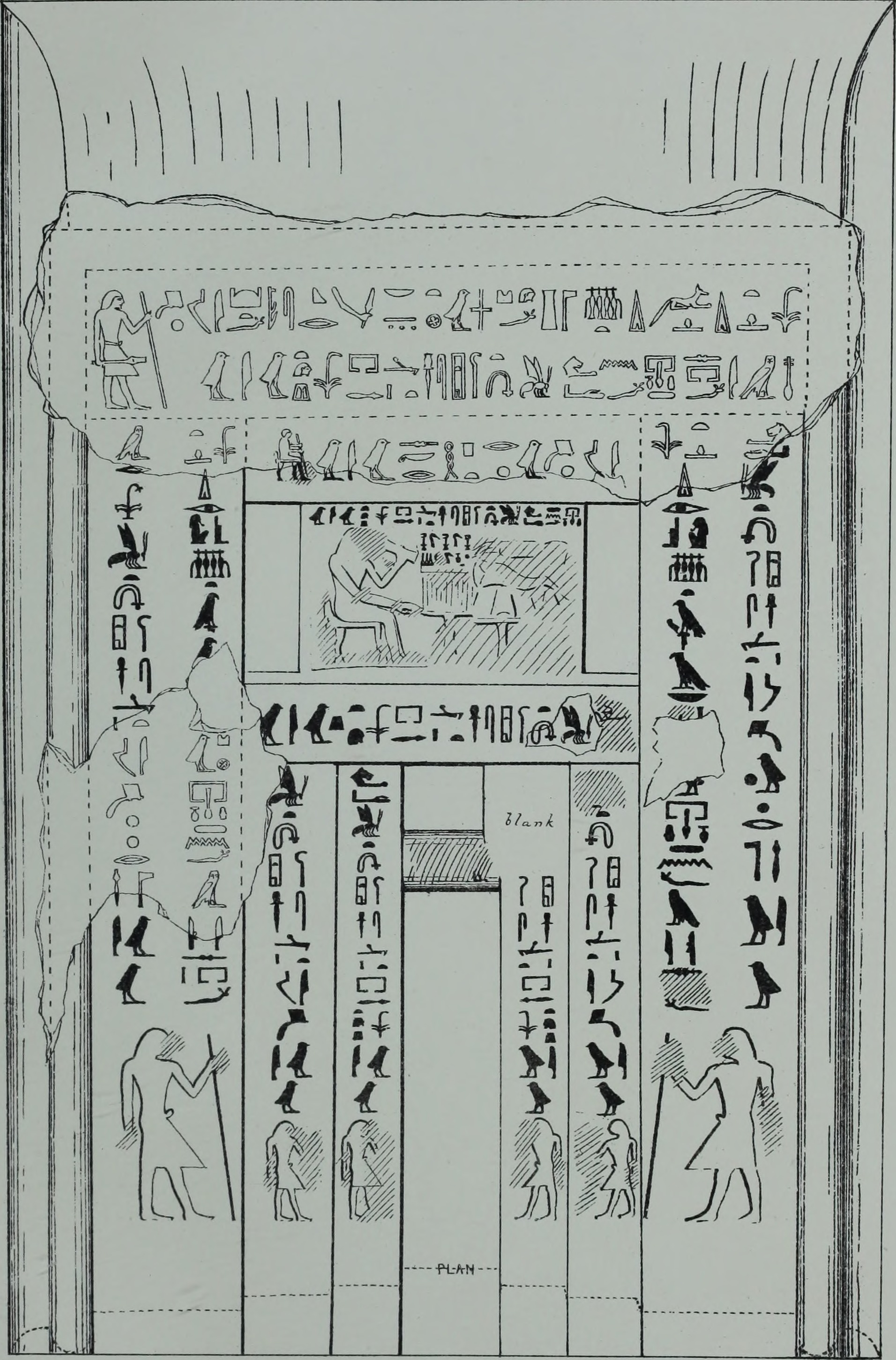
- False door of Wiu, Iyu in his tomb chapel
- Dynasty: 6th Dynasty
- Burial: 19, El Sheikh Sa'id
- Father: Meru?

Wiu with the second name Iyu was a local governor of the fifteenth nome of Upper Egypt ("the Hare nome") in the Sixth dynasty, c. 2300 BC. He was perhaps the son of his predecessor Meru/Bebi (tomb no. 20 at El Sheikh Sa'id), although this connection is not confirmed by any inscription. His son and successor was Meru (tomb no. 15 at El Sheikh Sa'id). Meru is also depicted in the tomb chapel of Wiu/Iyu.

Wiu is mainly known from his decorated rock cut tomb at El Sheikh Sa'id, that was found heavily damaged. The inscriptions in the tomb chapel preserve his titles, according to that he was royal sealer, sole friend, overseer of Upper Egypt and most importantly Grear overlord of the Hare-nome (the main title of a normarch).
