= Djehutynakht VI =

Ancient Egyptian Nomarch

- Nomarch of the 15th nome of Upper Egypt
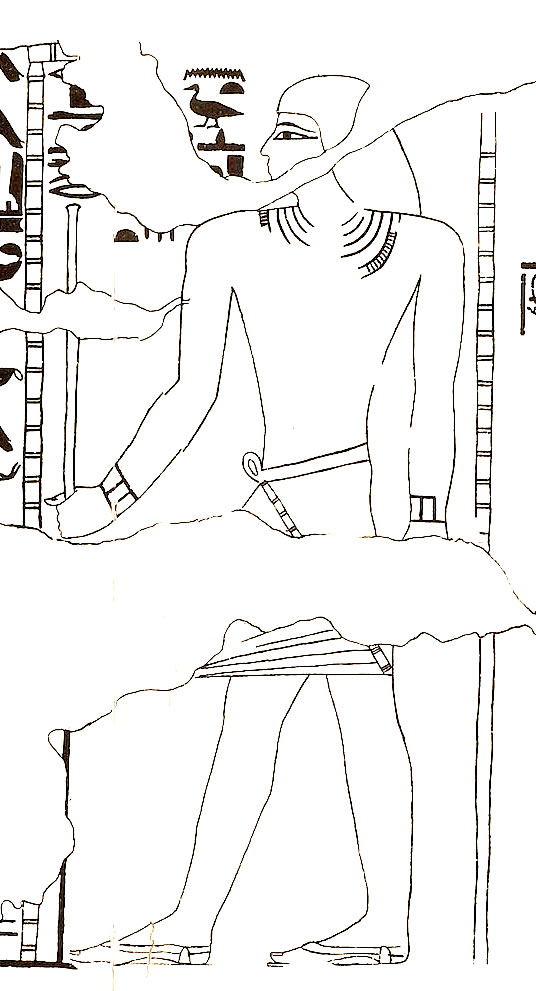
- Djehutynakht VI in his tomb
- Dynasty: 12th Dynasty
- Burial: (17L30/1), Deir el-Bersha
- Father: Neheri II
- Mother: Zathedjethetep

Djehutynakht VI (the ordinal is modern) was a local governor of the fifteenth nome of Upper Egypt ("the Hare nome") during the Twelfth dynasty, c. 1950 BC under the kings Senusret I or/and Amenemhat II. He was the son of Neheri II and his wife Zathedjethetep. His brother Amenemhat became governor too. His wife was called Hathorhotep.

Ahanakht is known from his decorated rock cut tomb at Deir el-Bersha (17L30/1, old no. 1). His tomb was found heavily destroyed. Its rock cut chapel consist of a single room with an inner chapel that was adorned with a statue. He bears the titles governor (Haty-a), great overlord of the Harr nome and leader of the two thrones and overseer of priests. He is also known from an inscription in the quarries at Hatnub, that is dated to a year 2.
