= Djehutihotep =

Ancient Egyptian nomarch

- Nomarch of the 15th nome of Upper Egypt
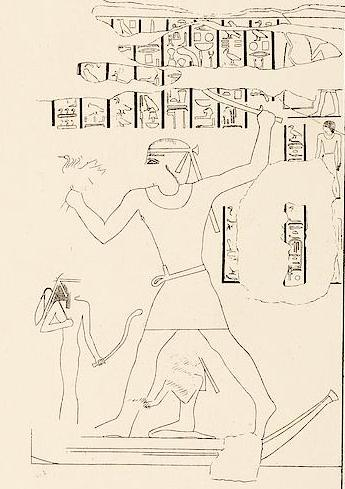
Egyptian name
G26 Htp p t
- Dynasty: Twelfth Dynasty
- Pharaoh: Amenemhat II, Senusret II, Senusret III
- Burial: Deir el-Bersha
- Spouse: Hathorhotep
- Father: Kay
- Mother: Satkheperka

Djehutihotep ("Thoth is satisfied") was an ancient Egyptian nomarch of the fifteenth nome of Upper Egypt ("the Hare") during the twelfth dynasty, c. 1900 BC.

== Biography ==
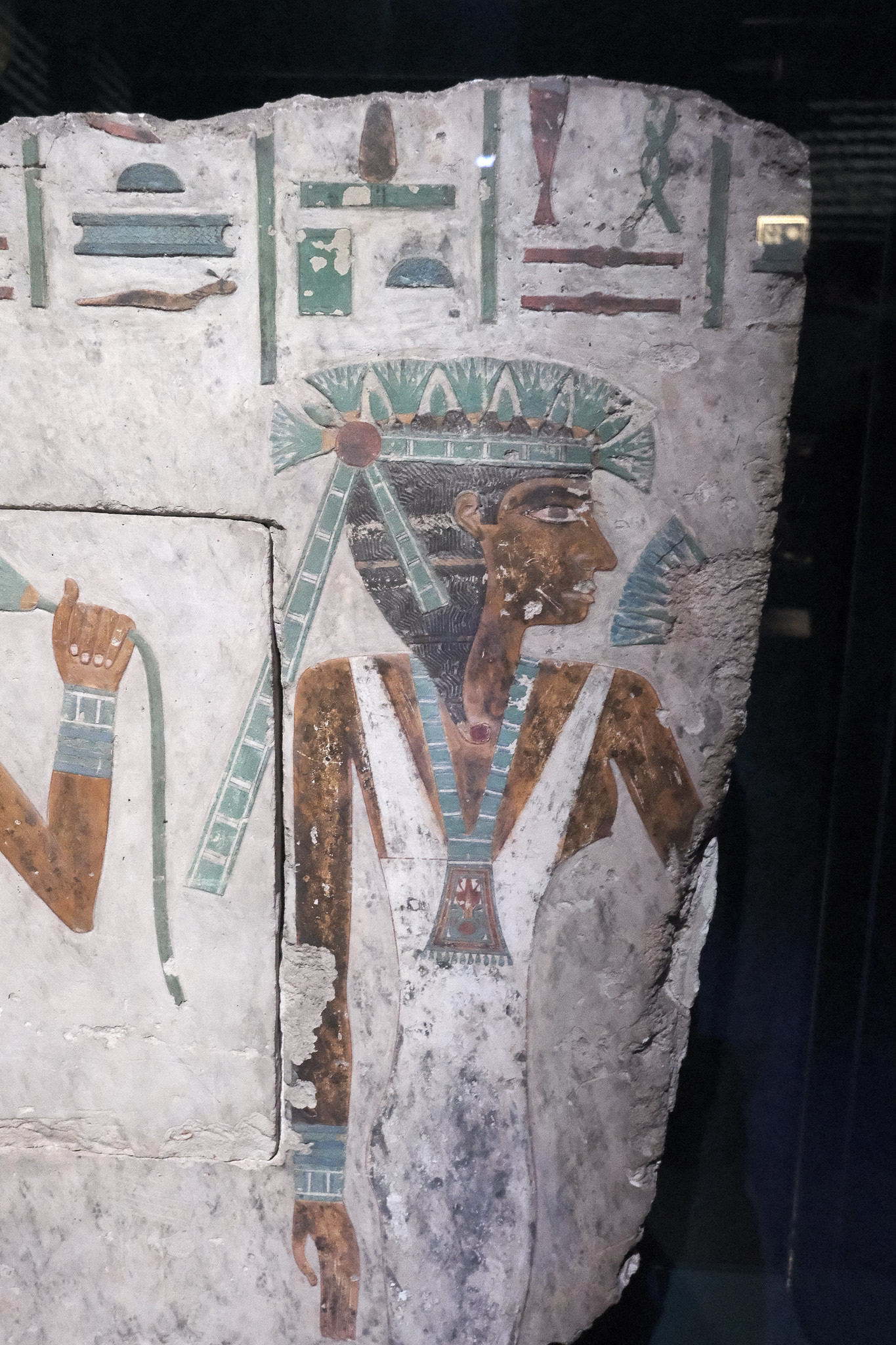
Daughter of Djehutihotep, relief in his tomb

Djehutihotep lived under the reigns of Amenemhat II, Senusret II, and Senusret III and was one of the most powerful nomarchs of the Middle Kingdom. His tomb—the only one among the necropolis of Deir el-Bersha that wasn't damaged by the explosives used in recent quarrying methods—is well known for the great quality of its decorations, a work carried out by an artist named Amenaankhu. For this reason, it is believed that Djehutihotep died prior to the strict measures reducing the power of the nomarchs that were established by Senusret III. Indeed, as their charge became hereditary at the end of the Old Kingdom, the nomarchs became local rulers effectively, although not nominally, independent of the pharaohs. This situation led to excesses in the exercise of power that worsened steadily during the First Intermediate Period. It was not until Senusret's measures were imposed that such abuse of power later exercised by nomarchs, stopped posing a threat to the integrity of the Egyptian state.

Being part of the hereditary nomarch system, Djehutihotep's family held the office of local governor for several generations. Djehutihotep was the son of a woman named Satkheperka and an official named Kay. The latter was the brother of Djehutynakht VI and Amenemhat, both of whom became governors of the Hare nome, although Kay did not. Djehutihotep was married to a woman named Hathorhotep. Her parents are not recorded in known sources. Several children of Djehutihotep are known. See "Nomarchs of the Hare nome" for further notes about his genealogy.

Two limestone jambs from Djehutihotep's tomb entrance are now on display in the National Archeological Museum of Florence (inv. nos. 7596 and 7597), having been purchased by Ernesto Schiaparelli in 1891–92. The jambs list his several civil and religious titles, which include Treasurer of the King, Unique friend (of the King), Overseer of the priests, and Great overlord of the Hare nome (i.e. nomarch). Djehutihotep was represented at the bottom of the jambs.

=== The "colossus on a sledge" ===
By far, Djehutihotep is known best for the famous decoration inside his tomb that represents the transport of a colossal statue of him that was nearly 6.8 metres (22.3 ft) high, being transported by 172 workers using ropes and a slide, in an effort that is facilitated by pouring water in front of the slide. With an estimated weight of 58 tonnes (57.1 long tons; 63.9 short tons), it was carved by a scribe, Sipa son of Hennakhtankh. Unfortunately, no traces of this colossus have ever been found. The colossus' depiction itself was irremediably vandalized and destroyed in 1890, and all the existing drawings are based on a single photo taken the previous year by a certain Major Brown.

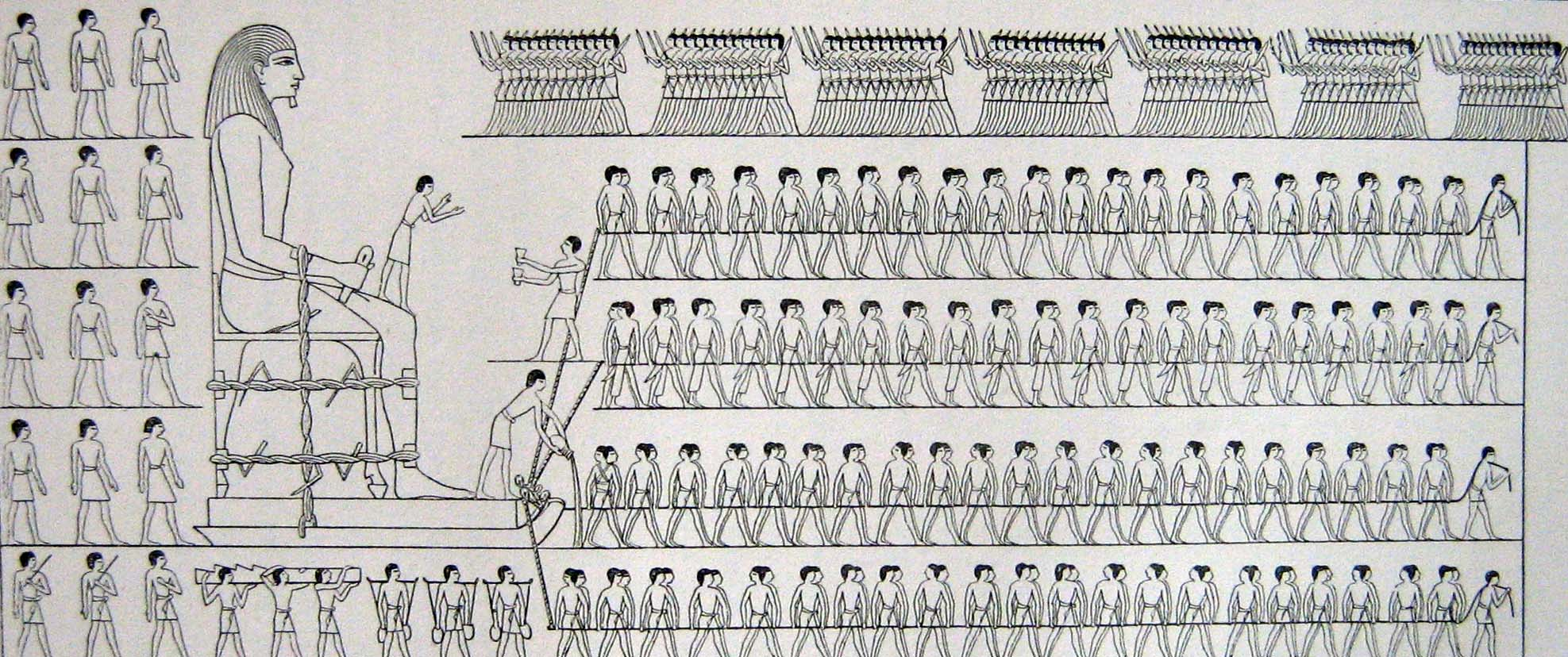
Schematic drawing of the transportation scene of the colossus showing water being poured in the path of the sledge, long dismissed by Egyptologists as ritual, but now confirmed as feasible, served to increase the stiffness of the sand and likely, reduced the force needed to move the statue by as much as 50%
