= Djehutynakht (10A) =

Ancient Egyptian nomarch

- Nomarch of the 15th nome of Upper Egypt
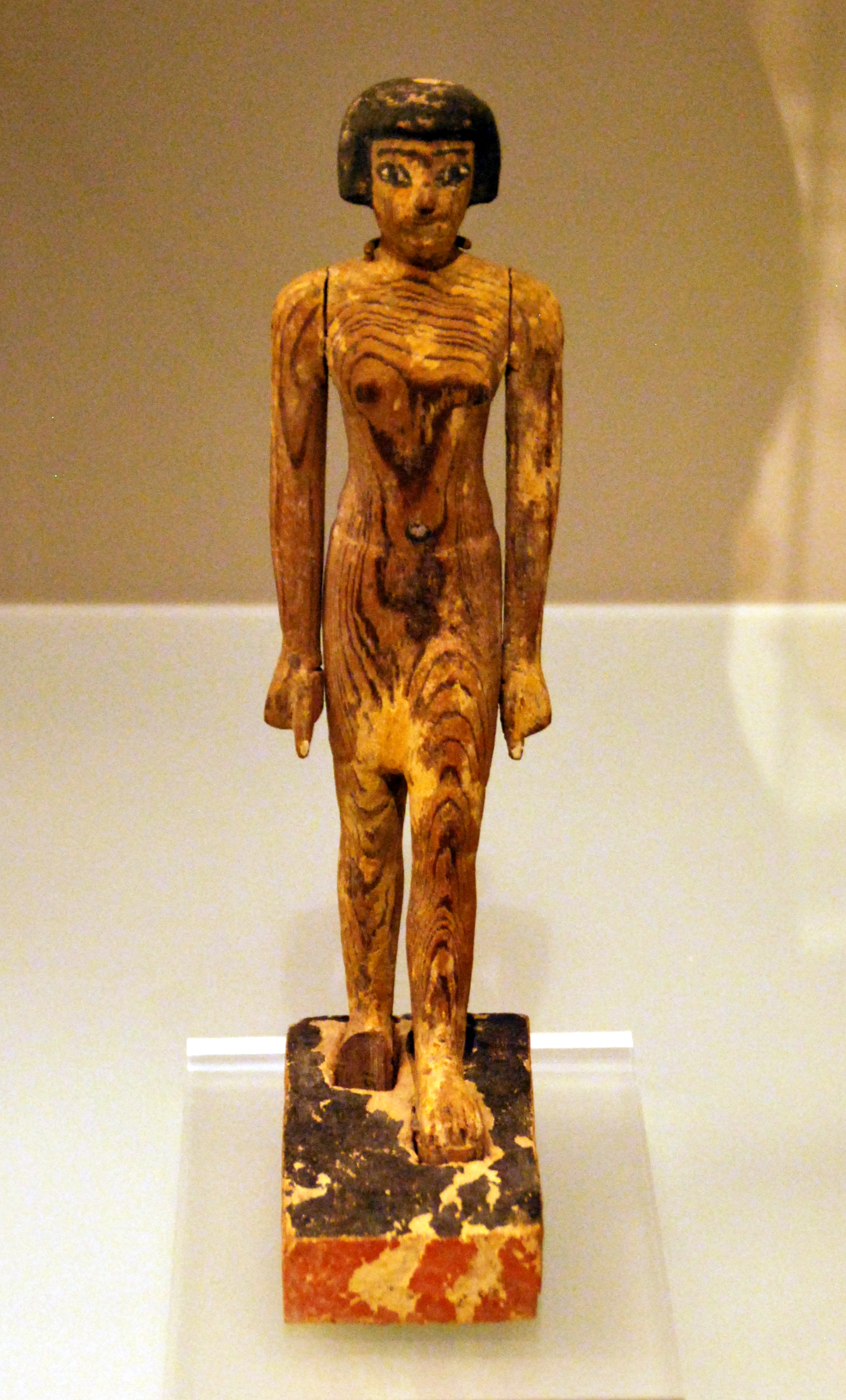
- Statuette of Djehutynakht
Egyptian name
G26 N35 M3 X1 Aa1ḏḥwty-nḫt
- Dynasty: 11th or 12th Dynasty
- Burial: Deir el-Bersha tomb 10A
- Spouse: Djehutynakht

Djehutynakht, tentatively identified with Djehutynakht IV or Djehutynakht V, was an ancient Egyptian "nomarch of the Wenet nome" (the 15th nome of Upper Egypt) during the very end of the 11th Dynasty or the early 12th Dynasty (21st-20th century BCE). He is well known for his painted outer coffin (commonly called the “Bersha coffin”) now exhibited in the Museum of Fine Arts, Boston along with his other grave goods.

== Biography ==
Once believed to have lived during the reign of king Senusret III of the 12th Dynasty, from the analysis of his furniture it has been deducted that he actually lived in an earlier period, although a degree of uncertainty still remains: it is very difficult to trace Djehutynakht's family and life events, and the only certain relationship is that with his wife, also named Djehutynakht. The name was very common in this period and six nomarchs bearing it are known, two of whom – the fourth and the fifth respectively – were married to a wife with the same name.

=== Djehutynakht IV, son of Ahanakht I ===
If this nomarch was the same as Djehutynakht IV, then he lived at the very end of the 11th Dynasty and was the son of the nomarch Ahanakht I, successor of his brother Ahanakht II, and predecessor of the nomarch Neheri I.

=== Djehutynakht V, son of Neheri I ===
If he was the same of Djehutynakht V, then he lived during the late reign of pharaoh Amenemhat I of the 12th Dynasty and was Neheri I's son and successor by his wife Djehutyhotep, and the uncle of his successor Neheri II. In either case, no children are known for Djehutynakht and his wife. See "Nomarchs of the Hare nome" for a complete genealogy.

== Burial ==
=== Tomb 10A ===
Djehutynakht's tomb – designated 10A – was rediscovered in the Deir el-Bersha necropolis in Middle Egypt in 1915 by the American Egyptologist George Reisner who was the leader of the Harvard University – Boston Museum of Fine Arts expedition. Almost nothing was left of the outer chapel, but the burial chamber, although already raided of the jewelry, still contained four finely painted cedar wood coffins belonged to Djehutynakht and his wife. His outer coffin, commonly called the “Bersha coffin”, is renowned as “the finest painted coffin Egypt produced and a masterpiece of panel painting”. In addition to the coffins, the tomb contained the nomarch's mummified head as well as lady Djehutynakht's canopic chest and a great quantity of funerary furniture such as pottery, canopic jars, several model boats, many models of men and women in different daily life activities, and the famous group composed of a priest and many offering girls, known as the “Bersha procession”. In its entirety, these objects form the largest Middle Kingdom funerary assemblage ever found.

The Egyptian government gave the whole content of Tomb 10A to the Museum of Fine Arts. During the naval trip to Boston in 1920, the collection was threatened by a fire on board, but fortunately the damage was very limited. For decades only the “Bersha coffin” and the “Bersha procession” were exhibited at the MFA; in 2009-2010 the whole collection was shown in a dedicated exhibition.

== Mummy ==
=== Mitochondrial DNA analysis ===
In 2018, the mummified head of Djehutynakht was analyzed for mitochondrial DNA (the DNA from his mother's side) in 2018. Two laboratories independently determined that he belonged to the Eurasian mtDNA haplogroup U5b2b5. Similar sequences have been observed in ancient DNA from Phoenicia and Europe but without an exact match, the nearest match is a living person from Lebanon. The observed U5 lineage could potentially reflect interactions between Egypt and the Near East that date as far back as the Predynastic and Early Dynastic periods. The sequence is similar to U5a lineage from sample JK2903, a more recent 2,000-year-old mummy from Abusir el-Meleq in Egypt. Haplogroup U5 is found in modern Egyptians at moderate frequencies but is higher in the Berbers of the Siwa Oasis in North West Egypt (16.7% in Siwa according to a 2009 study by C. Coudray). The related haplogroup U6 is much more common in most Berber populations.

== Gallery ==
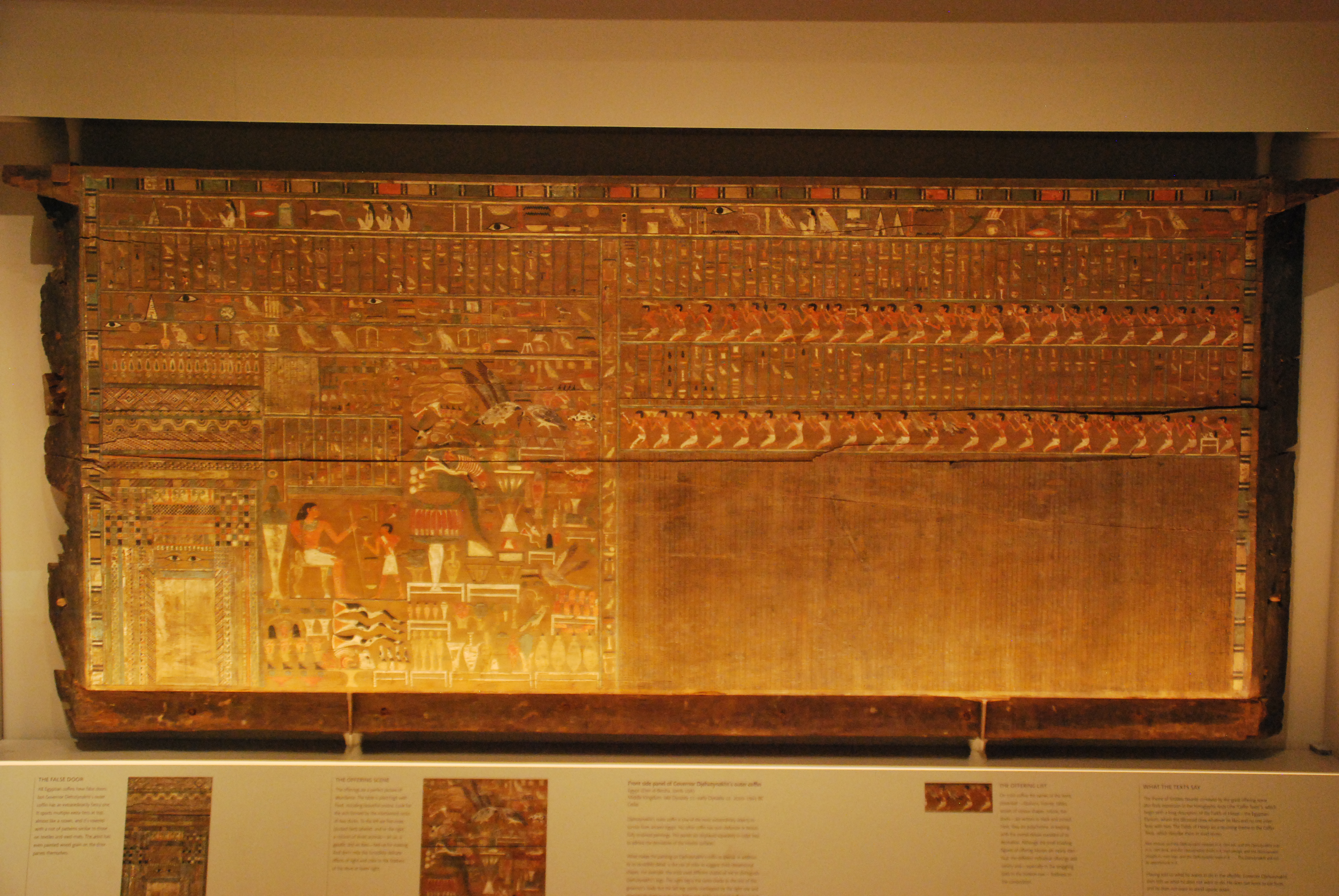
“Bersha coffin”.

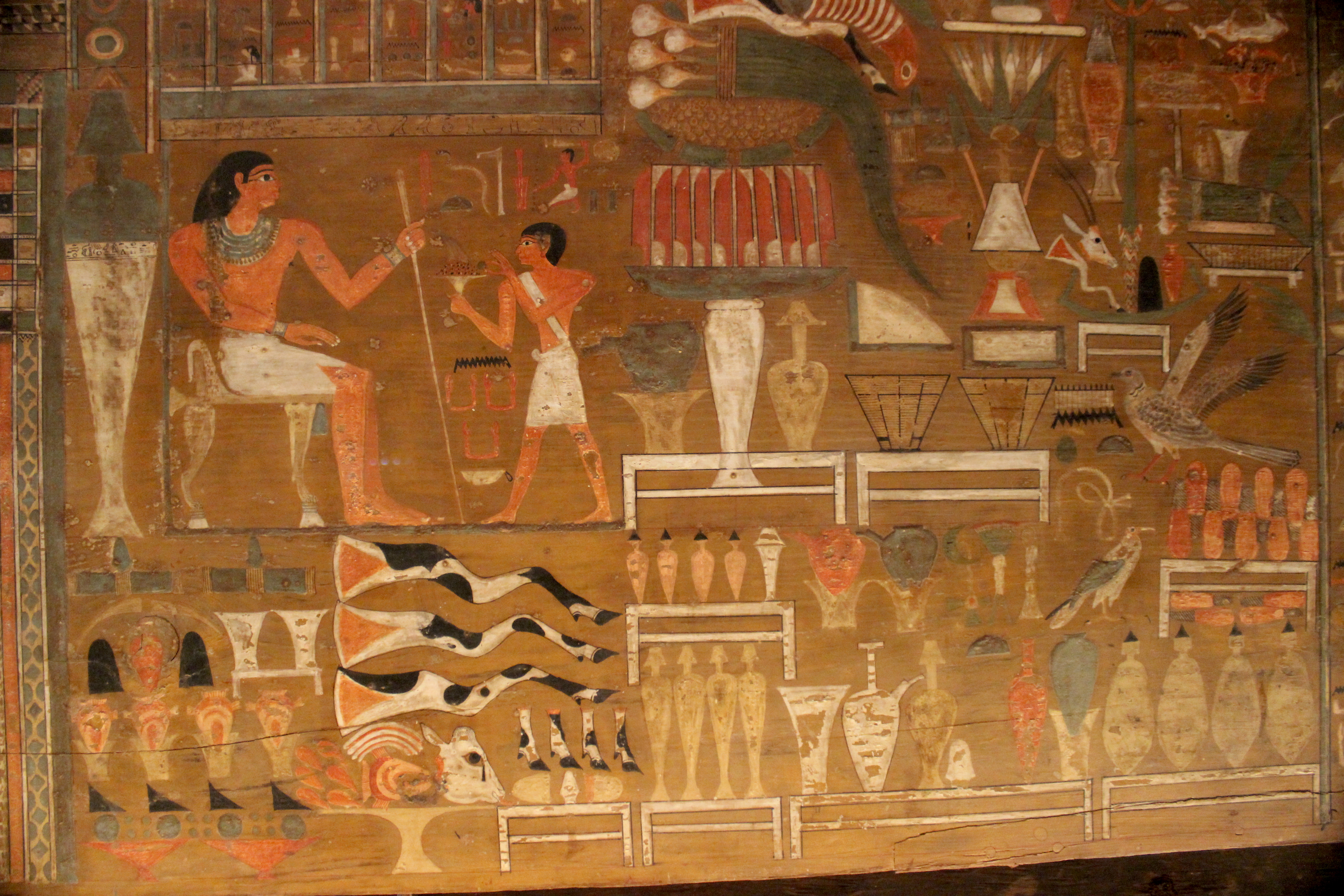
Coffin detail

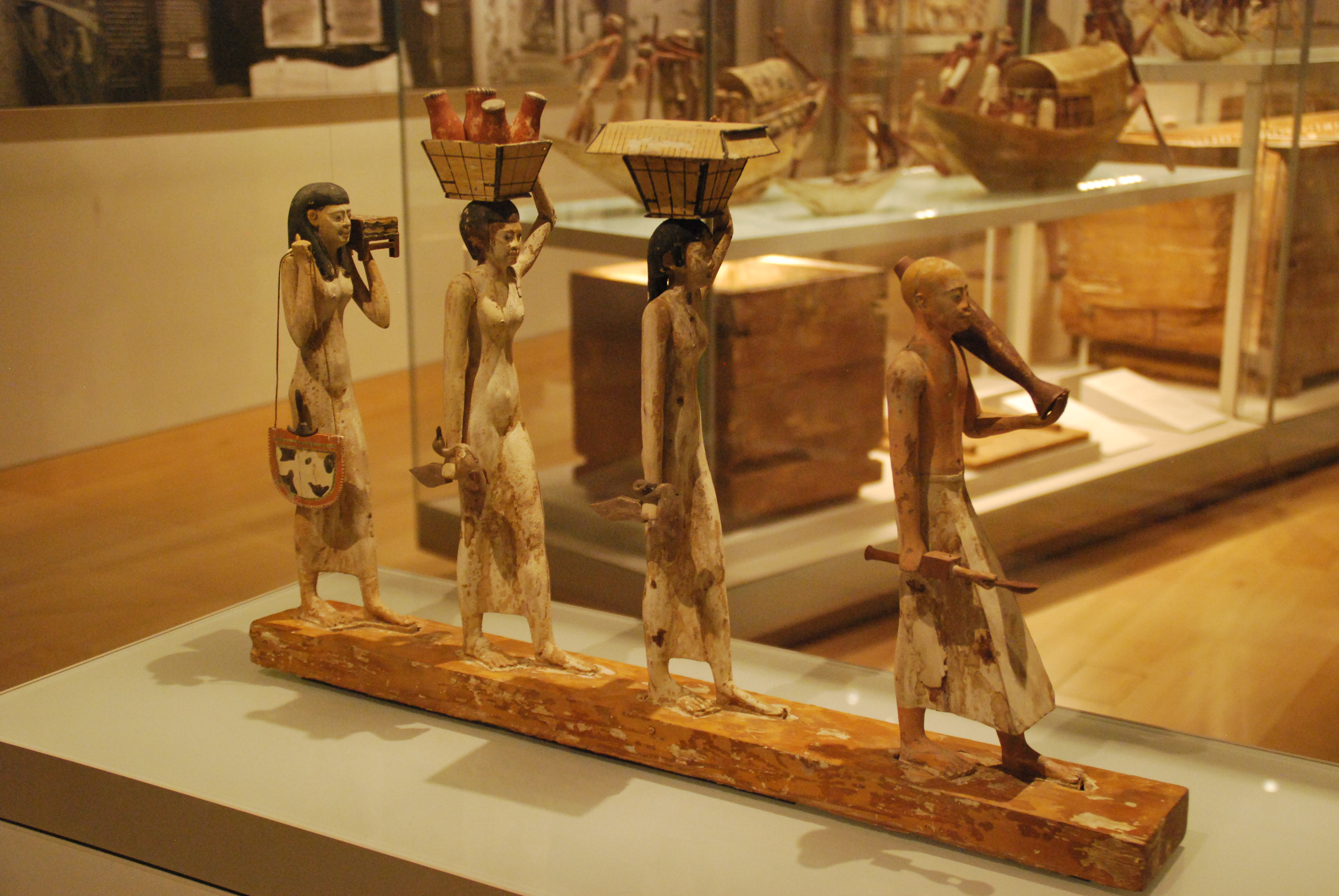
“The Bersha procession”

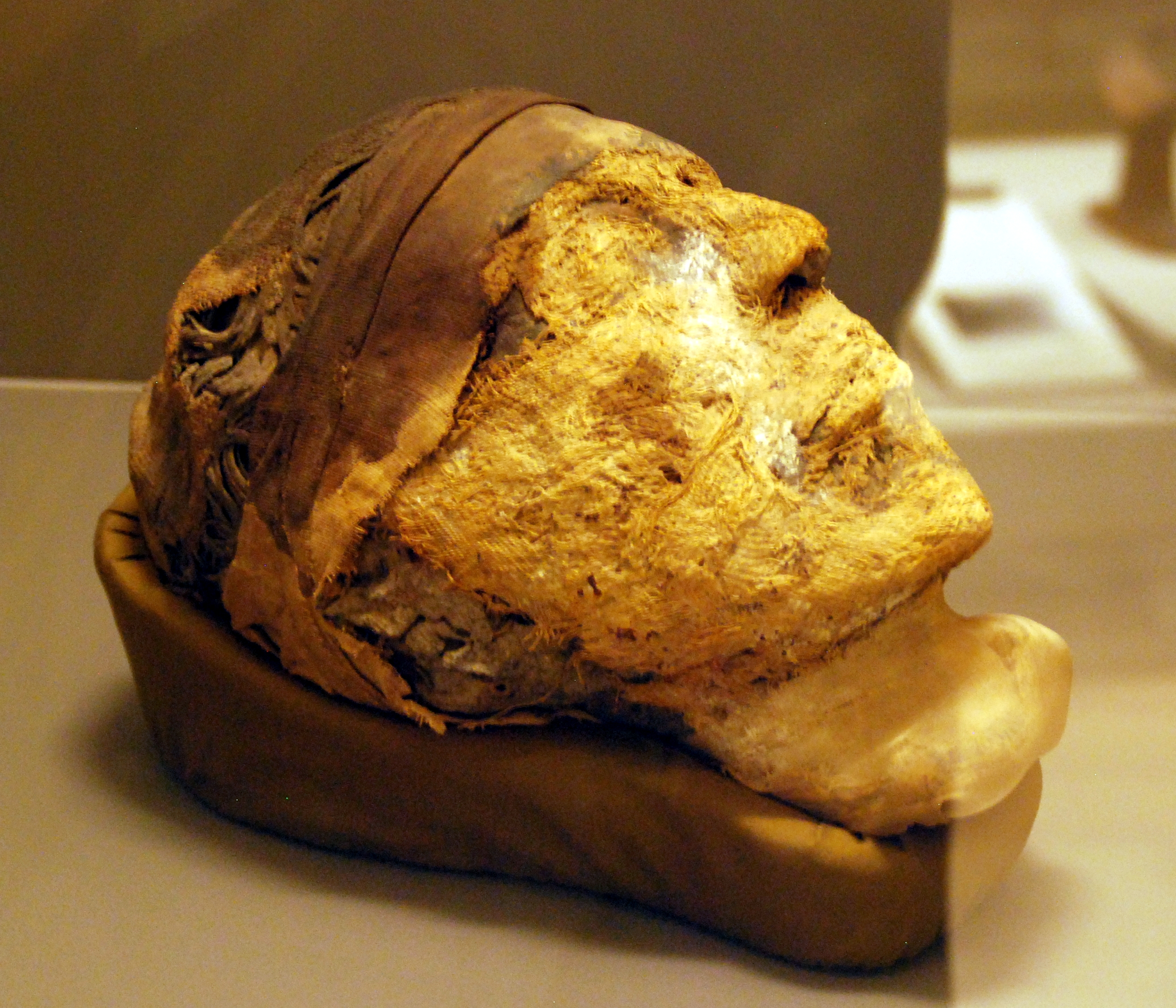
Head of the mummy

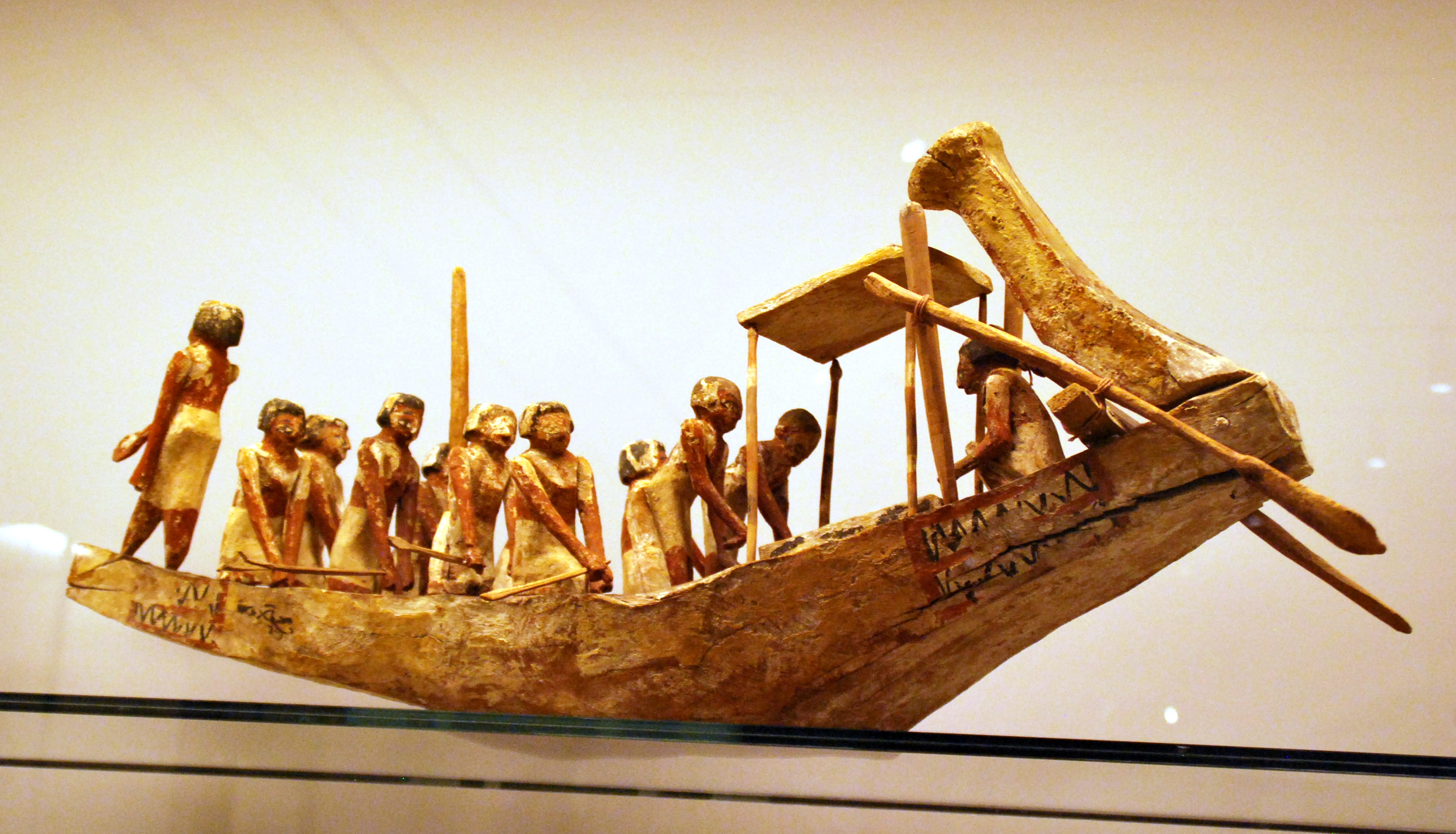
Model boat

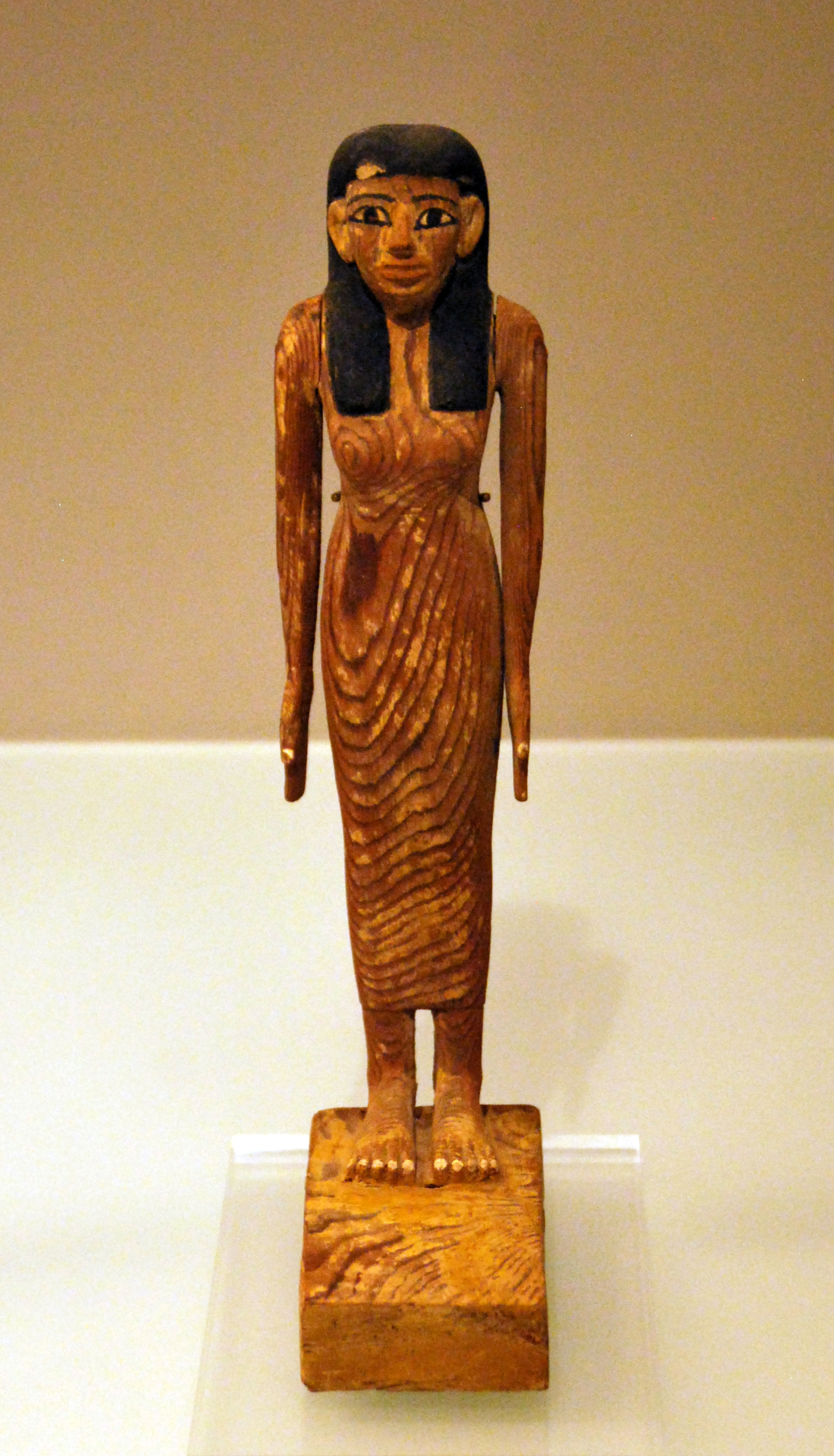
Statuette of Lady Djehutynakht

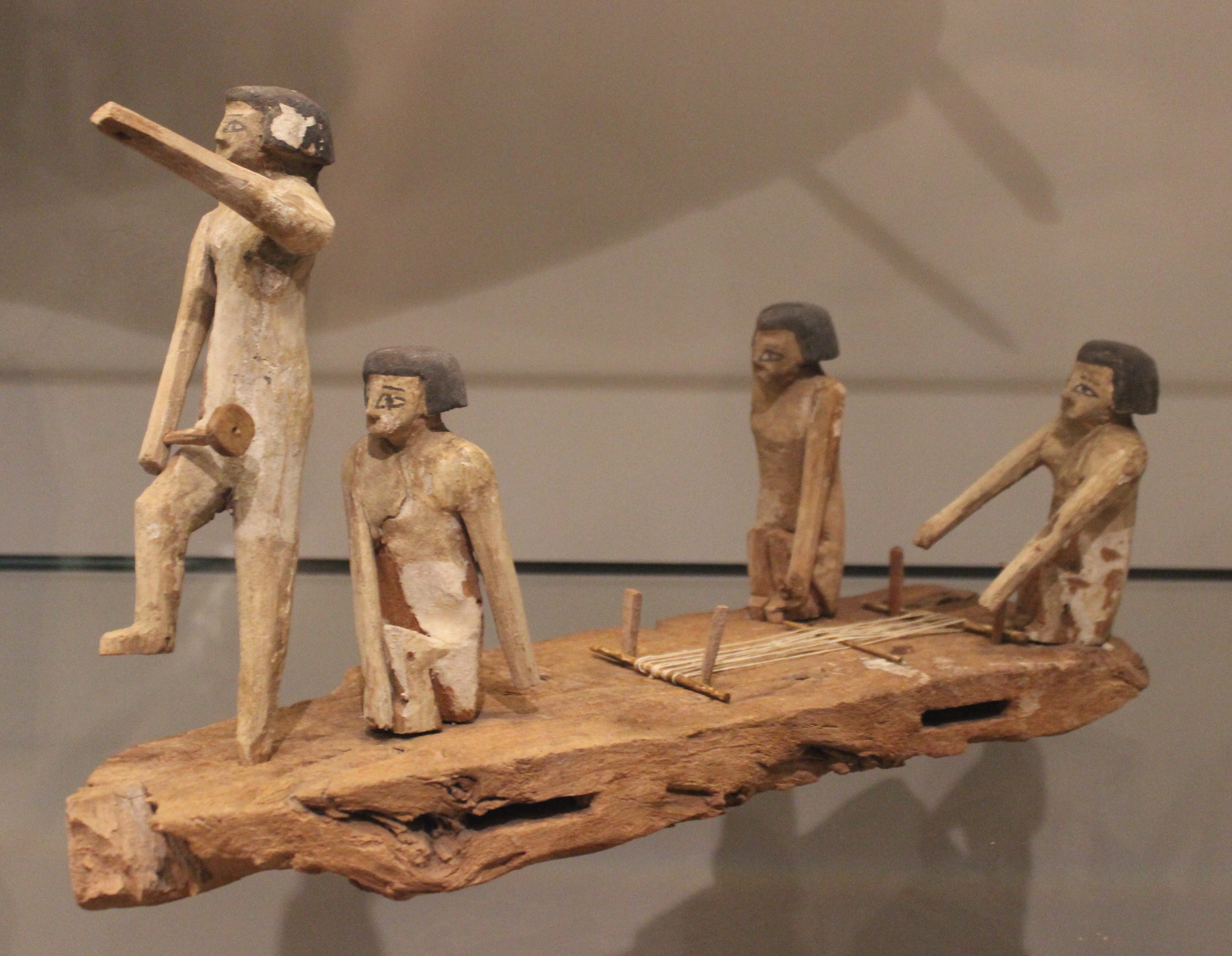
Model
