= El Sheikh Sa'id =

Ancient village and burial site in El Minya, Egypt

- Village
- Location in Egypt
- Coordinates: 27°43′N 30°53′E
- Country: Egypt
- Governorate: Minya
- Time zone: UTC+2 (EET)
  - Summer (DST): UTC+3 (EEST)

El Sheikh Sa'id is a small village in the Minya Governorate in Upper Egypt. Situated on the east bank of the Nile, it is named after a local Muslim saint buried in the area.

== Overview ==
El Sheikh Sa'id comprises the rock-cut tombs of the nomarchs of the Hare nome (the 15th Upper Egyptian nome) from the 6th Dynasty. These tombs are cut in steep cliffs. The use of this necropolis declined during the First Intermediate Period, when the monarchial necropolis was transferred slightly northward to Deir El Bersha.
