= Hatnub =

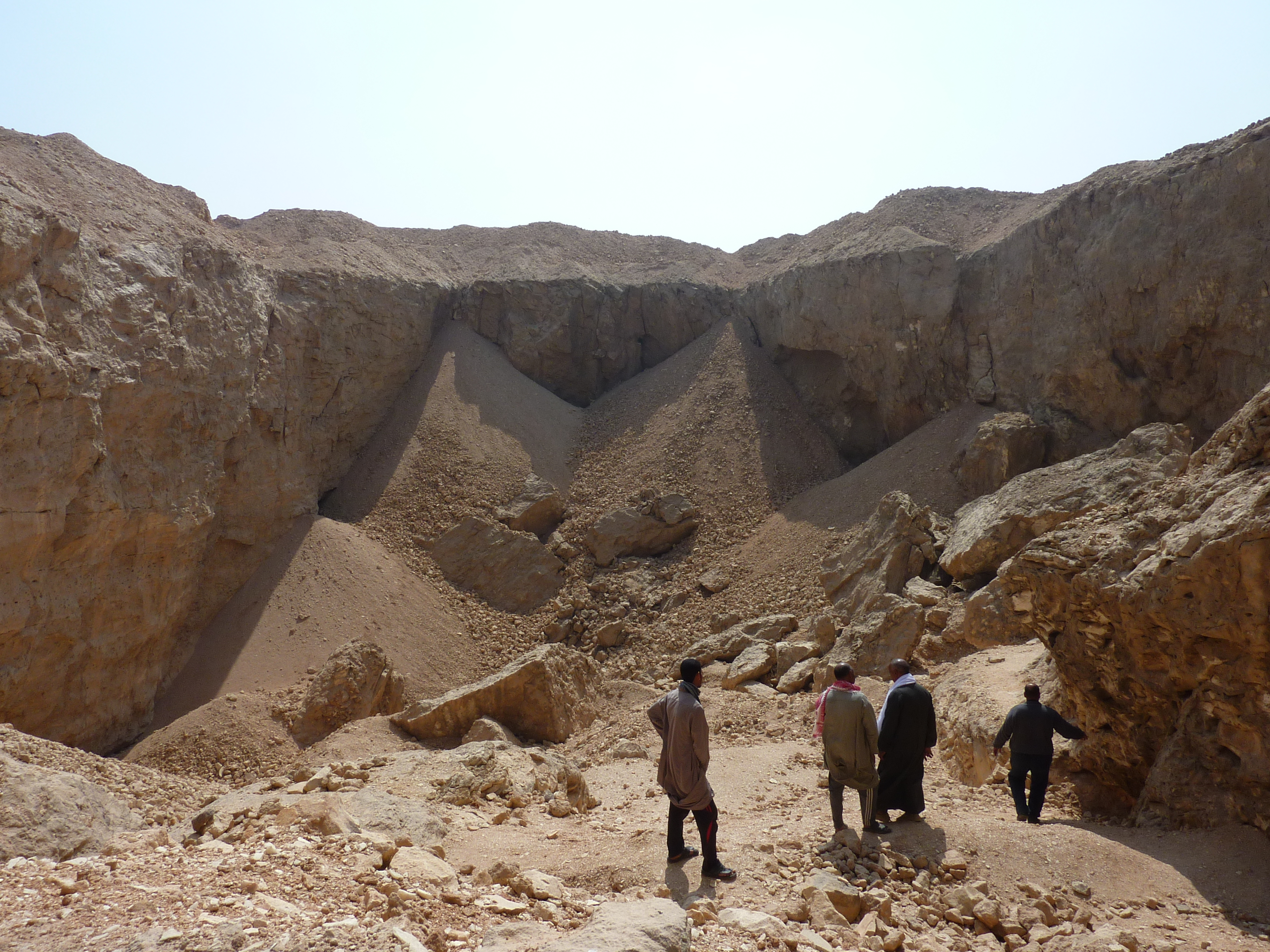
Inside the main quarry (Quarry P) at Hatnub. The quarry was originally roofed by rock, but the roof collapsed in antiquity.

Hatnub (ancient Egyptian: ḥwt-nbw, which translates to "mansion of gold") is an archaeological site located in Egypt's Eastern Desert, about 16 to 17 kilometres (9.9 to 10.6 mi) southeast of Tell el-Amarna, in the Minya Governorate. The site was the primary source for calcite travertine, also known as "Egyptian alabaster", which is a dense, translucent stone used throughout ancient Egyptian history for royal statuary, offering tables, canopic vessels, and temple architecture. Inscriptions and material culture suggest that Hatnub was quarried by state-sponsored expeditions from the 4th Dynasty (Khufu's reign) through the new kingdom, with some archaeological surveys indicating a small amount of activity into the Roman period.

== Quarry P, R and T ==
There are three main quarrying areas at Hatnub (designated Quarry P, R, and T), and over 50 dry-stone encampments and shelters to house workers. One central feature is the main Hatnub transport causeway locally called the Darb el-Agl, an engineered 16-to-17-kilometer desert road that once joined Quarry P to the Nile River near Kom el-Nana. Archaeologists find it to be the best-preserved ancient Egyptian transport road in Egypt with visible desert tracks, wadi causeways made from limestone and preserved parallel sledge trackways.

Hatnub is also notable for its extensive textual and architectural heritage. Rock walls in Quarry P and R contain numerous royal cartouches and hieratic graffiti from the Old and Middle Kingdoms, while tomb records at Abydos (the autobiography of Weni) and Deir el-Bersha document the transport of massive stone blocks and colossal statues from the site. In 2018, excavations at Quarry P uncovered a 45-meter rock-cut extraction ramp with a post-hole pulley system, providing significant physical evidence for how Pharaonic engineers lifted multi-ton stone blocks out of subterranean quarry pits.

== Geological context and travertine procurement ==
=== Geological formation and material properties ===
The stone extracted at Hatnub is a dense, non-porous variety of calcium carbonate (CaCO_{3}) that formed as precipitates filling caverns and fissures within the Eocene limestone of the Minia Formation. The deposits formed in caves and along faults during the late Tertiary and Quaternary periods. Groundwater dissolved the surrounding rock (karst dissolution), and calcite in the water was left behind in layers as cave deposits called speleothems. Those layers give the stone its bands and let light partly through it.

While historically and conventionally termed "Egyptian alabaster" or "calcite-alabaster" in Egyptological literature, geologists classify the rock strictly as calcite travertine to distinguish it from true gypsum-based alabaster. The ancient Egyptians called the material šs (sheser), often specifying its origin with the epithet šs n ḥwt-nbw ("travertine of Hatnub") or šs wʿb n ḥwt-nbw ("pure travertine of Hatnub").

=== Material Uses and Cultural Significance ===
Heart scarab of Ipy, overseer of works in Hatnub, serpentinite - Museo Egizio (Turin) C 5993 p03

Travertine from Hatnub was prized across Pharaonic history for its translucent, banded appearance, warm coloration, and relative ease of carving. The material was used extensively for luxury cosmetic vessels and canopic jars, as well as monumental items including sarcophagi, temple pavements, offering tables, barque shrines, and royal statuary.

Significant monumental works carved from Hatnub travertine include the sarcophagus of Seti I, fragments of a colossal statue of Amenhotep III at Kom el-Hettan bearing an inscription crediting Hatnub as its source, and a famous 13-cubit (6.8 m / 22 ft) colossal statue commissioned by the nomarch Djehutihotep.

=== Quarry Sites at Hatnub ===
Travertine extraction at Hatnub was concentrated across four primary archaeological workings, designated alphabetically:

- Quarry P is the largest and most prominent site, with an oval open pit approximately 70 by 50 meters (230 ft × 164 ft) and over 15 meters (49 ft) deep. However, Quarry P did not start as an open pit. It used to be under ground until the limestone roof collapsed due to workers undercutting the supporting rock while widening the subterranean section. The collapse dates between the 4th and 6th Dynasties. Archaeologists have been able to record this because 6th Dynasty and Middle Kingdom inscriptions were carved into fallen roof rock resting on the pit floor. Inscriptions and pottery suggest that Quarry P operated from the Old Kingdom through the 18th Dynasty of the New Kingdom. It served as the primary eastern terminus of the main 16-kilometer transport causeway.
- Quarry R (including Ra and Rb) is roughly 2 kilometers (1.2 mi) southwest of Quarry P. Quarry Ra was an underground cavern extending 50 to 60 meters into limestone bedrock. Quarry Ra demonstrates how travertine was mined underground primarily because its roof remained intact. It operated during the 12th Dynasty of the Middle Kingdom, while Quarry Rb represents a smaller, shallower surface working.
- Quarry T is approximately 1 kilometer (0.62 mi) east of Quarry R, comprising an open oval pit measuring 60 by 35 meters (197 ft × 115 ft).

== Quarry Roads ==
=== Route Trajectory and Topography ===
The main Hatnub route extends approximately 16 to 17 kilometers (9.9 to 10.6 mi) from Quarry P across the Eocene limestone plateau, down to the western desert escarpment, and crossing the Amarna embayment. The road ends near the Nile River. The western terminus is clearly identifiable in the desert near Kom el-Nana, south of Tell el-Amarna, where it once connected to a river embankment, referenced in Middle Kingdom texts as trti.

The low-lying western plain section has been covered by sand and the expansion of modern agriculture. However, the 8.2-kilometer (5.1 mi) section extending to the high desert plateau remains intact and it is considered the best-preserved Pharaonic transport road in Egypt.

=== Worker Provisions and Daily Life ===
Excavations around the wayside shelters and quarry pits provided material evidence on how Pharaonic expeditions obtained the supplies they needed.

- Ceramic Evidence: The ceramic assemblage from the Quarry P area settlements consists of Old Kingdom beer jars, Meidum bowls, and bread molds (bedja). The domestic beer jars and raw materials (grain, water and Nile-valley acacia firewood) were brought overland from the floodplain.
- Bread Molds: The bread molds and the charcoal-rich ash middens indicate that food was being prepared and bread baked in situ at the quarry camps.
- Water: There would have been large zir (water storage jar) emplacements along the causeway to provide drink for the haulage gangs who were crossing the desert.
- Fuel and Timber: Botanical charcoal analysis from hearths within the worker huts identified wood species including Acacia nilotica and Faidherbia albida. Because these trees grow along the Nile floodplain rather than in the arid Eastern Desert, all fuel for cooking and fires had to be transported from the valley along with food and water.

== Historical Records and Inscriptions ==
=== Old Kingdom Inscriptions and Weni's Expedition ===
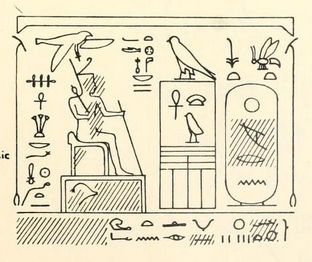
Inscription of Merenre, fourth king of the Sixth Dynasty, from Hatnub where a quarry was located.1928

Textual recording at Hatnub began during the Old Kingdom, with royal cartouches and hieratic graffiti inscribed directly onto the rock walls of Quarry P. Surviving texts attest to royal quarrying activity from at least the 4th Dynasty reign of Khufu through the 6th Dynasty reigns of Pepi I, Merenra, and Pepi II, extending into the 8th Dynasty.

The most detailed textual account of an Old Kingdom expedition to Hatnub comes from the autobiographical tomb stela of Weni the Elder (discovered at Abydos, Cairo CG 1435). Serving under the 6th Dynasty king Merenra I, Weni recorded that he was dispatched to Hatnub to extract a massive travertine offering table. According to his inscription, Weni completed the entire quarrying operation and overland transport in 17 days. To convey the monolithic slab northwards along the Nile, Weni constructed a 60-cubit long by 30-cubit wide (approx. 31.5 m × 15.7 m) broad transport vessel (wsbt-boat) from acacia timber. His text suggests that he successfully navigated the river during the low-water season when sandbanks were exposed.

=== Middle Kingdom Records and Nomarchic Expeditions ===
During the Middle Kingdom, the organizing travertine extraction at Hatnub shifted largely to local governors (nomarchs) of the Hare nome (15th Upper Egyptian nome), based at Hermopolis Magna (modern el-Ashmunein). There were several expeditions led by nomarchs such as Kay, Neheri, and Djehutihotep. Evidence of such expeditions were recorded as inscriptions in Quarry P and Quarry R.

The most famous visual record associated with Hatnub is a painted relief in the 12th Dynasty tomb of Djehutihotep at Deir el-Bersha. The relief depicts 172 men arranged in four parallel columns pulling a wooden sledge carrying a massive, 13-cubit (6.8 m / 22 ft) statue of the nomarch. Hieroglyphic texts state that the statue was carved from the "stone of Hatnub" (šs n ḥwt-nbw). In the scene, there is a worker standing before the feet of the statue pouring water before the sledge runners.
