= Deir El Bersha =

Deir El Bersha دير البرشا
- Location in Egypt
- Coordinates: 27°45′26″N 30°54′36″E
- Country: Egypt
- Governorate: Minya
- Time zone: UTC+2 (EET)
  - Summer (DST): UTC+3 (EEST)

Deir El Bersha (Arabic: دير البرشا; also written as Dayr al-Barsha, Deir el-Bersheh) is a Coptic village in Middle Egypt, in the Minya Governorate. It is located on the east bank of the Nile to the south of Antinoöpolis and almost opposite the city of Mallawi. During the pharaonic period, there was a vast cemetery, which is most well known for its decorated Middle Kingdom tombs on the north flank of Wadi Nakhla.

== Etymology ==
The name Barshā may be a preservation of the Ancient Egyptian toponym Pr-šs, meaning "House of Travertine" via Coptic Ⲃⲉⲣϣⲏ. The toponyms Αλαβάστρων Πόλις and Άλαβαστρίνη may be the Greek names for Pr-šs.

== Overview ==
Dayr al-Barsha necropolis is near the Nile valley town of Minya, 225 km south of Cairo. An elite cemetery Middle Kingdom on the North Hill (referred to as Zone 2) is the most well known area of the necropolis. During the Middle Kingdom, it was the cemetery of the governors ("nomarchs") of the Hare nome, the 15th Upper Egyptian Nome. It contains several spectacular rock-cut tombs, one of the most famous being that of the nomarch, Djehutihotep. Several of these tombs were destroyed by ancient quarrying and looting, including some for construction at Amarna. However, "despite their poor state of preservation, they still contain important texts which, linked to contemporary quarry inscriptions at Hatnub, make it possible to reconstruct a family tree of the governors, spanning much of the Middle Kingdom."

The cemetery was in use before the Middle Kingdom, with third-dynasty "rock-circle tombs," the largest yet found of this time period, have been found on the west of the Middle Kingdom cemetery (zone 8). It also continued to be used as a cemetery until the end of the Second Intermediate Period and the early New Kingdom, as shown by pottery shards found in later expeditions. The area was also known to be inhabited by Coptic monks, especially the tombs in the valley. These tombs would evidently be plundered, and evidence of animal ritual offerings and sacrifices would be mixed with food refuse.

== Excavations ==
In the winter of 1891–1892, a survey of tombs at Deir el-Bersha funded by the Egypt Exploration Fund was undertaken by Percy E. Newberry, George Willoughby Fraser, Howard Carter and Marcus Worsley Blackden. They recorded ten of the Middle Kingdom tombs across two volumes, one volume is solely dedicated to the tomb of Djehutihotep, a twelfth-dynasty nomarch whose tomb is well known for its depiction of the "colossus on a sledge," a tomb wall painting depicting the transportation of a colossal statue.

In 1897 and 1900, Georges Daressy and Ahmed Kamal excavated a number tomb shafts, including several in the forecourt of the tomb of Djehutyhotep. In several of these tomb shafts they found elaborately decorated and inscribed coffins of officials of the twelfth-dynasty, and grave goods such as offerings tables and wooden models. In 1902, Kamal returned to excavate at Dayr al-Barsha with a "Mr. Antonini, the owner of the sugar factory at Mallawī," and "only one object was considered worthy of publication, an offering table made of calcite alabaster."

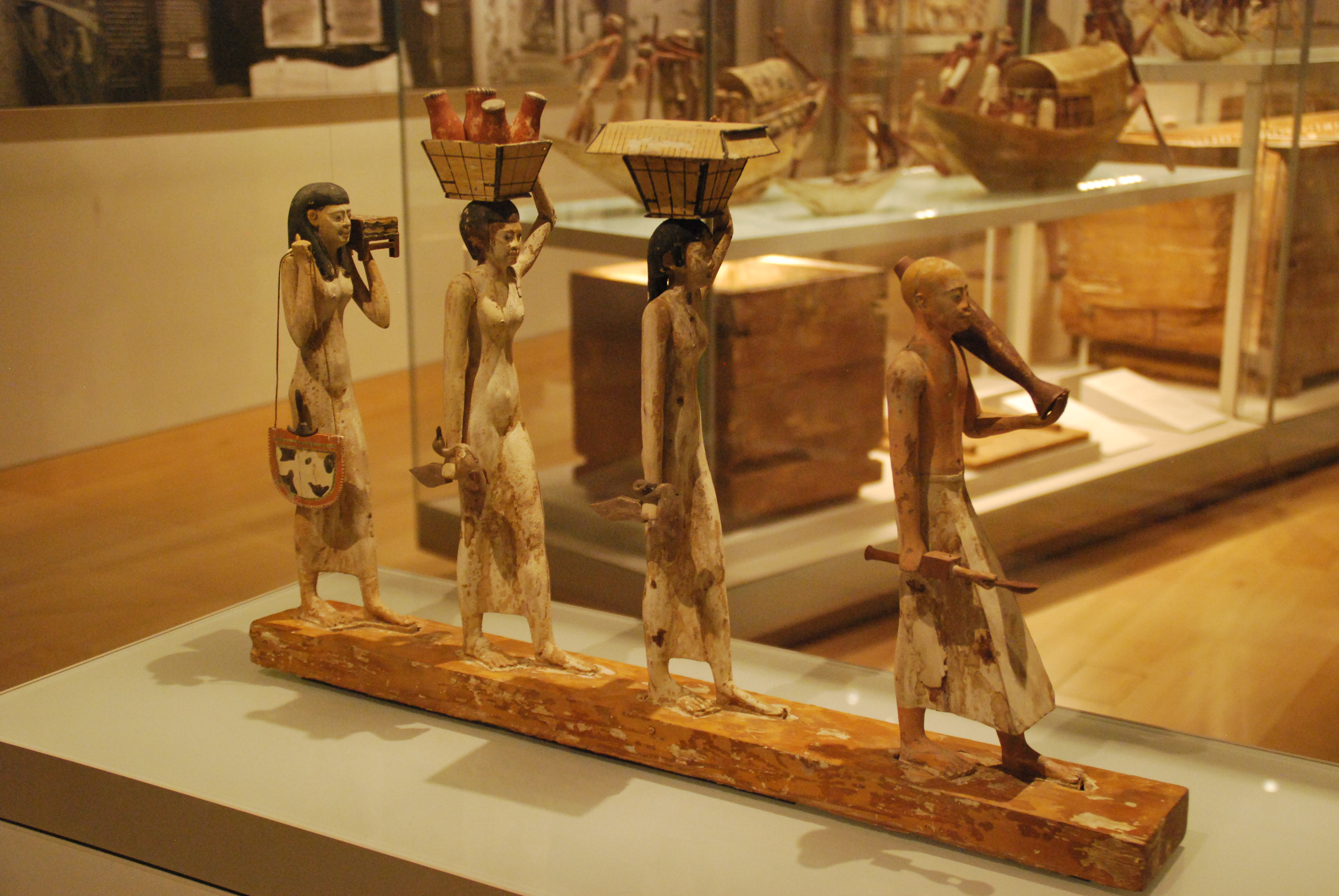
Offering Bearers from Tomb 10A.

In the spring of 1915, the Harvard University-Museum of Fine Arts, Boston, led by George Andrew Reisner expedition dug at Bersha. They excavated a tomb (designated number 10A) that belonged to an early Middle Kingdom nomarch named Djehutynakht. The tomb contained an enormous collection of wooden models representing scenes of daily life and boats along with the extraordinary painted coffins of Djehutynakht and his wife. The grave goods are now in the collection of the Museum of Fine Arts, Boston.

In the 1970s, there were some excavations that remain unpublished from the village of Dayr al-Barsha, undertaken by the Egyptian Antiquities Organization.

The current KU Leuven investigation of the site began in 1988 under Prof. Dr. Harco Willems, originally with Leiden University. In 1990, the project was a joint effort of Leiden University, the Museum of Fine Arts, Boston and the University Museum of Penn State University. In 1992, the mission was solely a Leiden University one. Between 1996 and 2001 there was a brief halt in the project, and in 2001, Willems, now at KU Leuven, obtained the grants to return to the project.

The current project aims to "provide a regional description of the archaeology of the region around Dayr al-Barsha, the southern limit being at al-Shaykh Sa’id and the northern one at Dayr Abu Hinnis." There have been several significant finds at Dayr al-Barsha during the current investigations.

In 2007, the burial chamber of Henu, an estate manager and high-ranking official during the First Intermediate Period (2181 to 2050 BC), was found. Henu's mummy was wrapped in linen and placed in a large wooden coffin that was inscribed with offering formulae. The chamber contained a large ka-statue of the deceased, as well as wooden tomb models representing workers making bricks, women grinding grain, a model of a boat with rowers, and full sized wooden sandals painted white.

In 2019, archaeologists announced that the oldest copy of The Book of Two Ways had been found on the Coffin of Ankh, an early Middle Kingdom coffin of a woman. The study published in the Journal of Egyptian Archaeology shows that the fragment includes Coffin Text spells 1128 and 1130, two spells that are found in the later examples of The Book of Two Ways.

== Tomb of Nomarch Djehutihotep ==
Djehutihotep was the prince of the nome of Hermopolis during the Middle Kingdom, and is the occupant of the noted Tomb No. 2. His tomb was the most decorated and notable of the ten tombs found at Deir el-Bersha, according to Percy E. Newberry of the 1891-92 expedition. This tomb contains a portico, an outer and inner chamber, and a shrine. The upper chambers of this tomb were decorated with paintings depicting different scenes from Djehutihotep's life.

=== Portico and Outer Chamber ===
The portico was fourteen feet deep, and about twenty three feet wide by fifteen feet tall. The façade was supported by two columns with palm leaf capitals, a symbol related to lower Egypt. The walls and ceiling of the portico were painted with hieroglyphs and designs like quatrefoils in several colors, including pink, blue, yellow and green. The inner ten feet of the large portico section are referred to by Newberry as the "Outer Chamber". In the center of the back wall there is a ten and a half foot by four foot door leading to the inner part of the tomb. The wall was about five feet thick.

=== Inner Chamber and Shrine ===
The main chamber of the tomb was rectangular and was measured at twenty feet by thirteen feet broad and high, and was twenty six feet deep. Down a few steps at the back wall of the main chamber was a shrine, to be closed by double doors as seen by the remaining pivot holes. It is in this chamber that the Colossus on a Sledge scene was found.

=== "Colossus on a Sledge" Scene ===
The walls of the inner chamber are decorated with numerous scenes, but most notably the Colossus on a Sledge. This work of art occupied five of the seven rows of paintings on the left hand wall. The scenes depict Djehutihotep and his men, the process of dragging a colossal statue on a sledge to a temple, and the sacrifices made on the occasion. There is also a large portion of writing that serves as an inscription of the scenes.

== Gallery ==
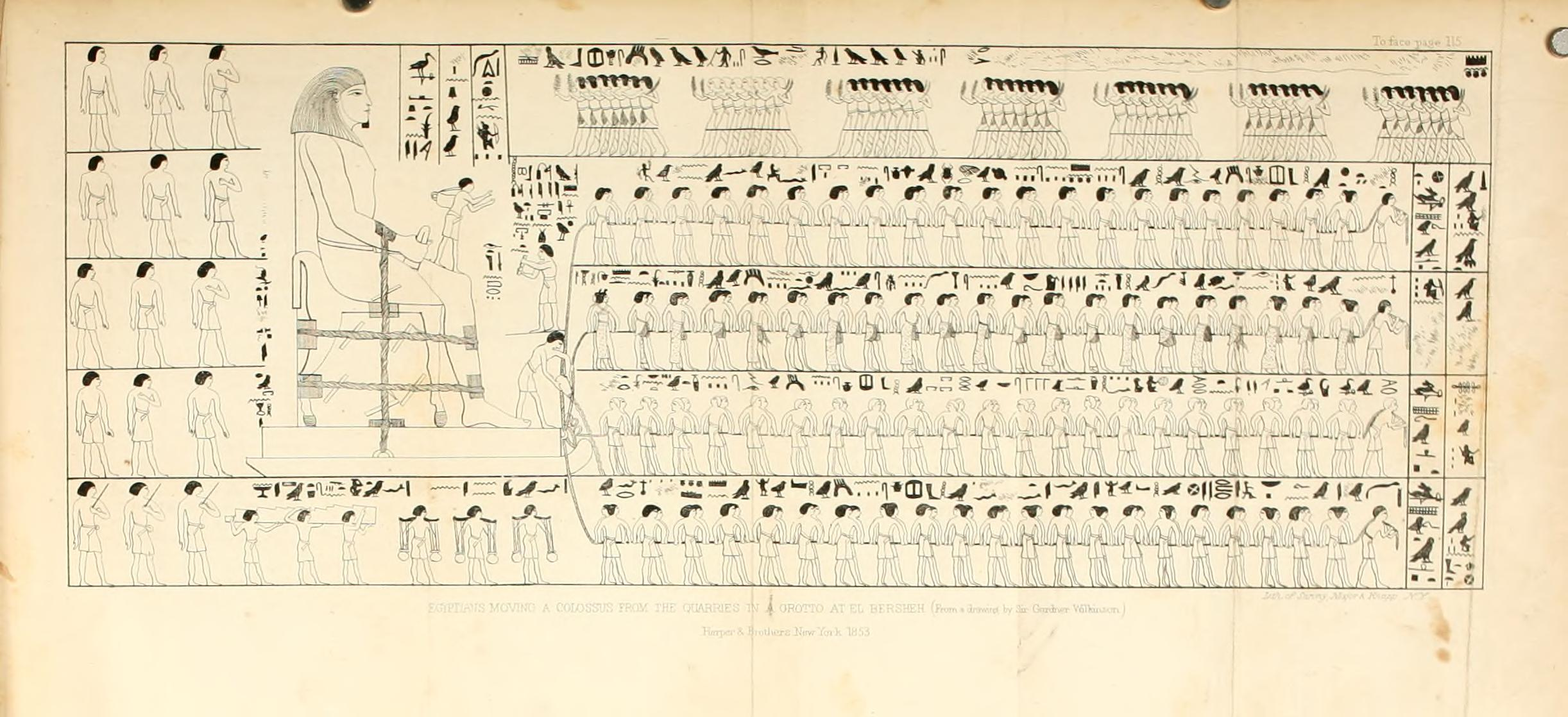
Transportation of the colossal statue in the tomb of Djehutyhotep

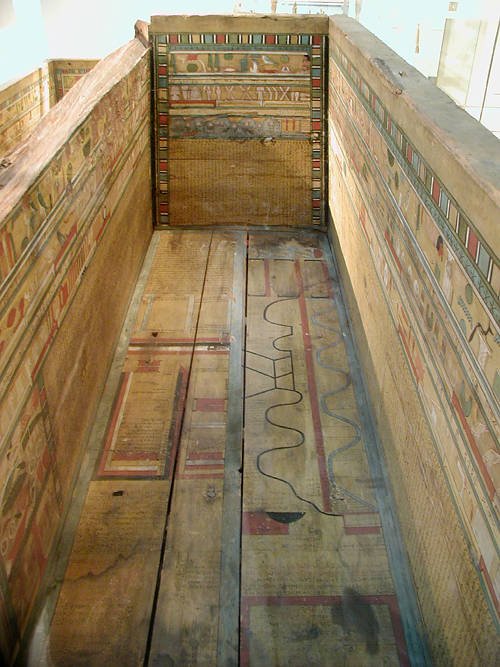
The Interior of the Coffin of Gua, Chief Physician

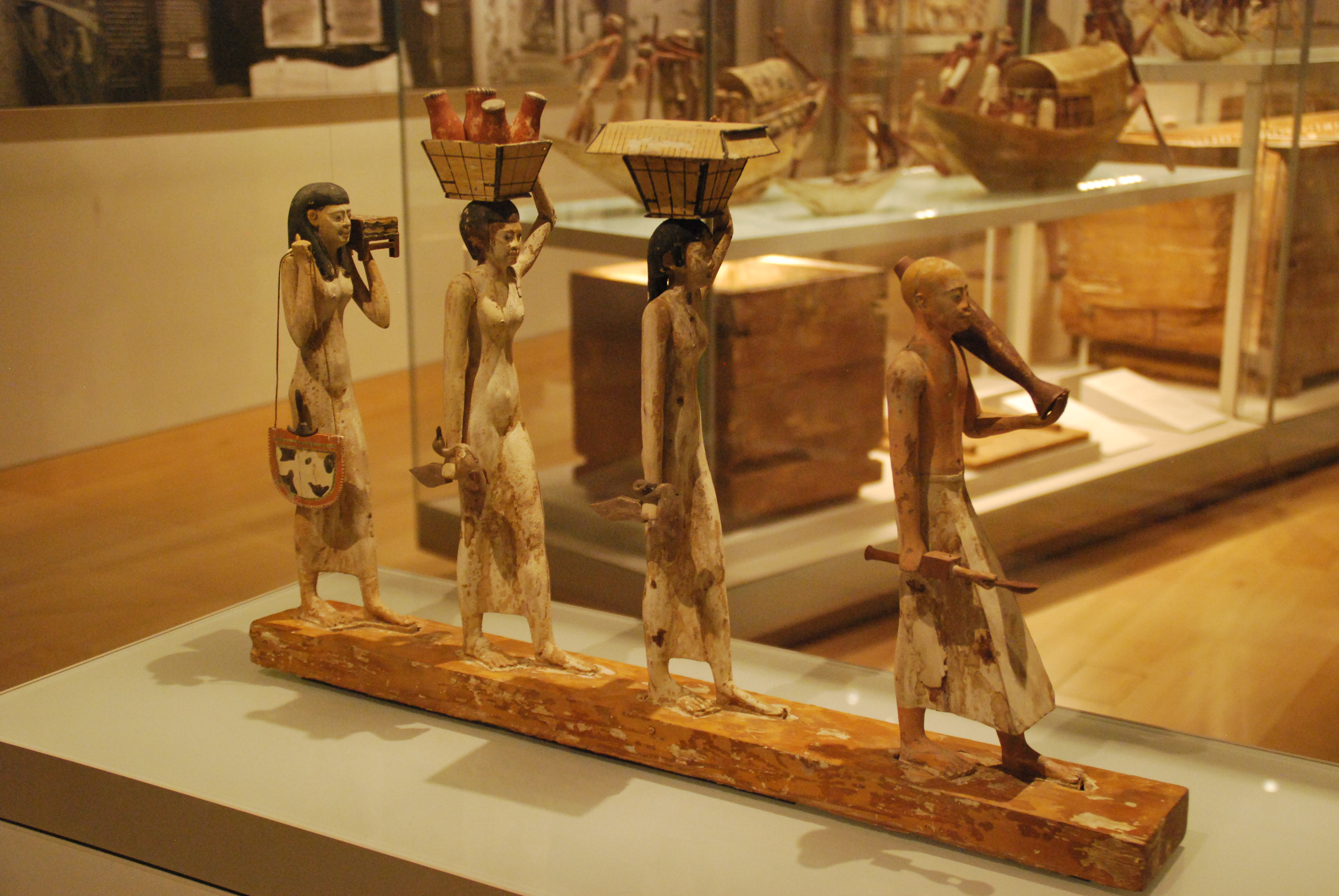
Procession of Offering Bearers from Tomb 10 A.

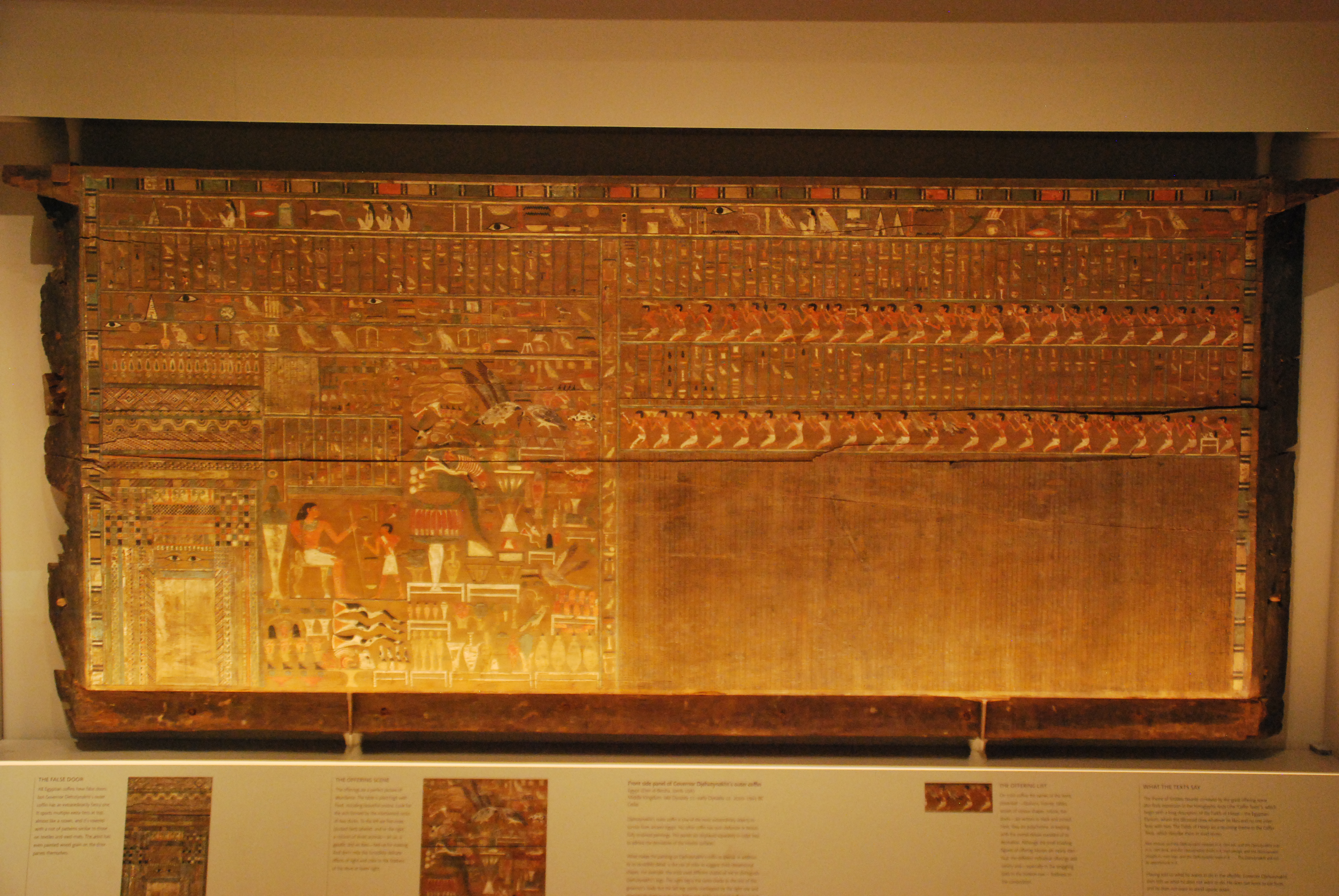
Outer Coffin of Djehutynakht

== Sources ==
- Dayr al-Barsha Project Site
- KULeuven Website
