= Nomarch =

Ancient Egyptian local governor

Drawing of a nomarch based on Middle Kingdom tomb paintings

A nomarch (Ancient Greek: νομάρχης, Ancient Egyptian: ḥrj tp ꜥꜣ Great Chief) was a provincial governor in ancient Egypt; the country was divided into 42 provinces, called nomes (singular spꜣ.t, plural spꜣ.wt). A nomarch was the government official responsible for a nome. More recent studies are more cautious about using this term as it is a Greek word that does not exactly match Ancient Egyptian administrative titles and modern scholars often prefer other, more neutral words for describing the heads of the provinces, such as governor.

== Etymology ==
The term nome is derived from Ancient Greek: νομός nomós "province, district". Nomarch is derived from νομάρχης nomárkhēs: "province" + -άρχης "ruler".

== Egyptian history ==
The division of the Egyptian kingdom into nomes can be documented as far back as the reign of Djoser of the 3rd Dynasty in the early Old Kingdom, c. 2670 BCE, and potentially dates even further back to the Predynastic kingdoms of the Nile valley. The earliest topographical lists of the nomes of Upper and Lower Egypt date back to the reign of Nyuserre Ini, of the mid 5th Dynasty, from which time the nomarchs no longer lived at royal capital but stayed in their nomes.

The power of the nomarchs grew with the reforms of Nyuserre's second successor, Djedkare Isesi, which effectively decentralized the Egyptian state. The post of nomarch then quickly became hereditary, thereby creating a virtual feudal system where local allegiances slowly superseded obedience to the pharaoh. Less than 200 years after Djedkare's reign, the nomarchs had become the all-powerful heads of the provinces. At the dawn of the First Intermediate Period, the power of the Pharaohs of the 8th Dynasty had diminished to the extent that they owed their position to the most powerful nomarchs, upon whom they could only bestow titles and honours.

The power of the nomarchs remained important during the later royal revival under the impulse of the 11th Dynasty, originally a family of Theban nomarchs. Their power diminished during the subsequent 12th Dynasty, setting the stage for the apex of royal power during the Middle Kingdom.

== Later re-use of the term ==
The title nomarch continued to be used into the Roman period.

The title is also in use in modern Greece for the heads of the prefectures of Greece, which were also titled nomos (pl. νομοί, nomoi; νομαρχία, nomarchia also being used to refer to the area within a nomarch's purview).

== See also ==
- Haty-a
- Pepi II Neferkare
