= List of pharaohs =

Pharaoh of Egypt
- The Pschent combined the Red and White crowns of Lower and Upper Egypt

Details
- Style: Five-name titulary
- First monarch: Narmer/Menes
- Last monarch: Nectanebo II (last native); Cleopatra and Caesarion (last Hellenistic); Maximinus Daza (last use of titulary)
- Formed: c. 3100 BC (± 150 years)
- Abolished: 342 BC (last native); 30 BC (last Hellenistic); 313 AD (last use of title)
- Residences: Varies by era
- Appointer: Hereditary

The pharaohs were the monarchs of ancient Egypt from the unification of Upper and Lower Egypt c. 3100 BC, with several times of fragmentation and foreign rule. The specific title of "pharaoh" (pr-ꜥꜣ) was not used until the New Kingdom, c. 1400 BC, but it is retroactively applied to all Egyptian kings; the generic term for monarchs was "nesut" (nswt). In addition to these titles, pharaohs had a complex royal titulary that remained relatively constant during its 3000-year history, having up to five royal names.

Egypt was continuously governed, at least in part, by native pharaohs for approximately 2500 years, until it was conquered in the late 8th century BC by the Kingdom of Kush, whose rulers adopted the pharaonic titulature and became the 25th Dynasty. Following 100 years of Kushite rule, Egypt underwent another century of independent native rule before being conquered by the Achaemenid Empire. The last native pharaoh was Nectanebo II of the short-lived 30th Dynasty, which ended when the Achaemenids conquered Egypt for a second time in 342 BC. The Achaemenids were in turn conquered by the Macedonians of Alexander the Great in 332 BC, after which Egypt was ruled by the Hellenic pharaohs of the Ptolemaic dynasty. Their rule came to an end with the Roman conquest of Egypt in 30 BC, and pharaonic Egypt ceased to be an independent monarchy. However, Roman emperors continued to be accorded pharaonic titles by the Egyptians until the reign of Maximinus Daza in 313 AD.

The dates provided for most of Egypt's early history are only approximate and may vary depending on the author, sometimes by centuries. The names and order of kings is mostly based on the Digital Egypt for Universities database developed by the Petrie Museum of Egyptian Archaeology. For royal titles and hieroglyphs, see the handbook of Jürgen von Beckerath, as well as the website Pharaohs of Ancient Egypt, which itself contains extensive bibliography.

Regnal numbers did not exist in ancient Egypt, but are a modern way to distinguish pharaohs known by the same name.

== Sources and chronology ==
Modern lists of pharaohs are based on historical records, including ancient Egyptian king lists and later histories, as well as archaeological evidence. Concerning ancient sources, Egyptologists and historians alike call for caution regarding their credibility, exactitude, and completeness; many of them were written long after the reigns they report. An additional problem is that ancient king lists are often damaged, inconsistent with one another, and/or selective.

Given the lack of sources, it is impossible to fix exact dates for the early dynasties. However, most authors give dates around 3000 BC. (Note: Theologist Christine Tetley used her own reconstruction of the Royal Annals to establish an alternative chronology that places Narmer's accession c. 3389 BC. She disregards conventional chronology and, especially for the later dynasties, relies heavily on Biblical accounts.) According to computations derived from the Turin King List (c. 1250 BC), the First Dynasty most likely began c. 3100 BC, ± 150 years. This appears to be supported by radiocarbon dating studies, which often show earlier dates. (Note: A 2013 study placed the accession of Aha, the second pharaoh, most likely between 3111 and 3045 BC (with 68% confidence), with a broader range of 3218 to 3035 BC (with 95% confidence). However, radiocarbon dating only gives broad approximations subject to several external factors. For instance, while the aforementioned study placed Den in the range of 2945–2904 BC, a 2023 study placed his accession earlier, in the range of 3011–2921 BC, nearly a century earlier.)

Astronomical events, mainly the Sothic cycle, have also been used to try to fix "absolute dates", but these have their own set of problems. Richard Parker dated the accession of the 12th-dynasty pharaoh Senusret III to 1878 BC (with his 7th year falling in 1872 BC). However, other authors such as Rolf Krauss have refuted Parker's computations; Krauss instead dates Senusret's accession to 1837/36 BC (7th year in 1831/30 BC). Similarly, the accession of Amenhotep I was dated to c. 1550–1515 BC (9th year c. 1541–1506 BC). Scholars often use the Egyptian "high" chronology, which assumes these astronomical observations were made in a single place (at Memphis). While there is debate on its accuracy, (Note: The 7th year of Sensuret III would be 1830 BC if the astronomical observation was made at Elephantine. According to one independent study, the date should be 1840 BC, or, according to another, 1879 BC. Others have even proposed 1980 BC. It has been argued that Sothic dates should not be consulted in the first place given their lack of certainty.) the high chronology used by scholars such as Ian Shaw appears to be closer to the dates implied by radiocarbon dating. (Note: According to radiocarbon dating, Senusret III became king c. 1890–1830 (with more possibility c. 1880–1860), while two studies have dated the accession of Ahmose I, predecessor of Amenhotep, c. 1570–1544 (possibly c. 1566–1552) or c. 1564–1528 (possibly c. 1557–1537). A recent independent study has proposed Year 1 of Ramesses II as 1297 BC, slightly earlier than the current consensus of 1279 BC.)

Most pharaohs' reigns are not fully documented, leading to many discrepancies in reign lengths. A formal regnal dating system was not adopted until the Middle Kingdom, and the day following a coronation was automatically recorded as "Year 1", meaning that regnal years alone cannot be used to calculate exact Julian years. (Note: During the Middle Kingdom, "Year 1" began on the same day as a pharaoh's accession, but "Year 2" began on New Year's Day (I Akhet, day 1). This system was changed in the New Kingdom, where "Year 2" began on the actual anniversary of the pharaoh, but reverted back in the Late Period.) Thus, it is impossible to determine exact dates even when some events can be securely dated. Dates with some certainty can only be given for the New Kingdom onwards, and only dates from the Late period can be securely dated and synchronized with other ancient chronologies.

Compare the chronological lists in Beckerath 1997, pp. 187–192, Beckerath 1999, pp. 283–289, University College London 2000, Bunson 2002, pp. 105–108, Shaw 2003, pp. 481–488, Hornung, Krauss & Warburton 2006, pp. 490–495, Mladjov 2021a and Mladjov 2021b.

=== Ancient Egyptian king lists ===
Royal lists after the Fifth Dynasty give only the throne name of each pharaoh, which has often led to confusion in identifying particular kings. The most detailed king lists, the Abydos, Saqqara and Turin canons, date to the New Kingdom, also known as the Ramesside period. Unfortunately, most of these Ramesside lists are of little value for the early dynasties (from which they are separated by over 1000 years), as they feature corrupted names and often disagree with contemporary sources. Complete king lists were certainly made after the 20th dynasty, but they have been lost.

The following king lists are known:

- Den seal impressions (1st Dynasty, c. 3000 BC); found on a cylinder seal in Den's tomb. It lists all 1st Dynasty kings from Narmer to Den by their Horus names.
- Qa'a seal impressions (1st Dynasty, c. 2900 BC); found in Qa'a's tomb. It lists all eight kings of the 1st Dynasty by their Horus names.
- Tomb of Sekhemkare (5th Dynasty, c. 2500 BC); records five kings from Khafre to Sahure; the contemporary tomb of Netjerpunesut also includes Djedefre.
- Royal Annals of the Old Kingdom (5th Dynasty, c. 2400 BC); carved on an stele. Recorded the individual years of about 30 kings from Narmer to at least Kakai. Broken into small pieces, mostly known for the Palermo Stone.
- Tomb of Seshemnefer III (5th Dynasty, c. 2400 BC); carved onto the walls of Seshemnefer's mastaba tomb. Not an actual king list; it mentions at least 8 kings from Sneferu to Neferirkare Kakai.
- Giza writing board (6th Dynasty, c. 2400 BC); painted on gypsum and cedar wood. Records 6 kings of various dynasties.
- South Saqqara Stone (6th Dynasty, c. 2200 BC); carved on a black basalt slab. Recorded the reigns of the first 5 kings of the Sixth Dynasty; it was later reused as a sarcophagus lid and thus almost all of the original text is lost.
- Tod list (11th Dynasty, c. 2000 BC); inscribed on two blocks at a temple in Tod. It features the first four kings of the Eleventh Dynasty.
- Wadi Hammamat king list (12th dynasty, c. 2000–1800 BC); records five kings of the Fourth Dynasty.
- Karnak King List (18th Dynasty, c. 1450 BC); carved on limestone at the Festival Hall of Thutmose III. Lists 61 kings from Sneferu, but with no apparent order and omitting several names. 39 names have been lost.
- Tomb of Amenmose (19th Dynasty, c. 1280 BC); lists Mentuhotep II and 11 kings from Ahmose I to Seti I.
- Abydos King List (19th Dynasty, c. 1280 BC); carved at the Temple of Seti I. Very detailed, but omitting some kings from the First Intermediate Period and all from the Second Intermediate Period. Records a total of 76 kings from Menes to Seti I. A similar but damaged list is found in the Abydos temple of Ramesses II, Seti's son and successor.
- Saqqara Tablet (19th Dynasty, c. 1250 BC), carved on limestone in a private tomb. Very detailed, lists 68 kings from Anedjib until Ramesses II.
- Turin King List (19th Dynasty, c. 1250 BC); written on a papyrus dating to the reign of Ramesses II. Listed every known king with their exact reign length, and divided some of them into groups similar to Manetho's dynasties. The document itself is a sloppy copy of a much more detailed original, which is in turn based on much older sources. The document is today damaged and incomplete, with most of the last sections missing. The papyrus lists 223 kings, but only about 1/3 of the names have survived. The original likely included further kings until Ramesses II.
- Table of Qenherkhopshef (19th Dynasty, c. 1250 BC); found in the Karnak complex. Lists 17 kings from Senakhtenre Ahmose to Ramesses II.
- Tomb of Khabekhnet (19th Dynasty, c. 1250 BC); lists Mentuhotep II and five kings from Senakhtenre Ahmose to Amenhotep I alongside other family members.
- Ramesseum king list (19th Dynasty, c. 1250 BC); carved in the mortuary temple of Ramesses II, lists Menes, Mentuhotep II and most of the New Kingdom pharaohs.
- Medinet Habu king list (20th Dynasty, c. 1150 BC); carved in the mortuary temple of Ramesses III, very similar to the Ramesseum king list.
- Tomb of Inherkhau (20th Dynasty, c. 1150 BC); records seven kings of the New Kingdom until Ramesses IV alongside other family members.
- Genealogy of Ankhefensekhmet (22nd Dynasty, c. 750 BC); carved on a limestone dating to the reign of Shoshenq V, today damaged. Not an actual king list; it mentions at least 18 kings from Mentuhotep II to Psusennes I.

=== Manetho ===
Before the decipherment of Egyptian scripts in the early 19th century, Manetho's Aegyptiaca, written in Greek in the early 3rd century BC, (Note: Some authors have questioned the chronological placement of Manetho: he is not mentioned by any author before Josephus, and his negative depiction of the Hyksos could be interpreted as antisemitism, which did not exist during Ptolemaic times. This view is not commonly accepted; the identification of the Hyksos as Jews, while treated as fact by Josephus, was most likely not present in Manetho's original work. One papyrus dated to 241/0 BC mentions one "Manetho" that possibly corresponds to the Egyptian historian.) was the sole source for all ancient Egyptian history. Manetho, himself an Egyptian priest, recorded the entirety of his country's history from mythological times until the conquest of Alexander the Great in 332 BC. He also created the dynastic framework still used by modern scholars, as well as coining the term "dynasty" itself. The original work is now lost and survives only through later epitomes and quotations, chiefly in the writings of Josephus (Contra Apionem, c. 100 AD), Julius Africanus (c. 230 AD), and Eusebius (c. 330 AD). These summaries transmit primarily chronological data in the form of regnal lists, though Josephus' quotations show that Manetho originally included detailed narratives, regnal lengths in years and months (rounded as years alone by Africanus and Eusebius), and even alternate royal names.

Africanus' epitome, which is preserved by George Syncellus (c. 810 AD), is generally regarded as the most reliable, while that of Eusebius is considered more problematic, having been derived from an incomplete and already corrupted source. (Note: For Dynasty II, Africanus and Eusebius record 9 kings, but only Africanus provides all names. Similarly, Africanus records 8 kings for Dynasty III, while Eusebius records 17 and names only one. Africanus records all 9 kings of the Dynasty V, but Eusebius records 31 kings and lists two names that are actually copied from the Sixth Dynasty. The 12th dynasty is also preserved only by Africanus.) All surviving transmissions suffer from errors, inconsistencies in regnal totals, variant name spellings, and a failure to account for contemporaneous dynasties—whether due to Manetho himself or to later copyists. Josephus, Africanus, and Eusebius all used independent, and sometimes contradictory, versions of the same work, each copy adding a new layer of typos and corruptions.

The content of the Aegyptiaca must be treated with caution. Manetho likely blended historical tradition with mythology, and later Christian authors are known to have altered Manetho's figures, especially for the Second Intermediate period, to accommodate events into the Biblical narrative. Additional distortion arose from the transmission of Egyptian royal names into Greek and from repeated copying over centuries (Greek, like Latin, was written using scriptio continua, with no spaces or punctuation between words). Despite these limitations, Manetho remains a foundational source for Egyptian chronology, provided his data are critically evaluated and corroborated with archaeological and contemporary evidence.

Some fragments of Egyptian history are also covered by some Greek historians such a Herodotus (c. 450 BC) and Diodorus Siculus (c. 50 BC).

=== Number of kings ===
The Turin King List records 207 kings up to the end of Dynasty XVI. In addition, it preserves 16 damaged names that Kim Ryholt associates with the so-called Abydos Dynasty, totaling 223 kings in the preserved papyrus. The original document, however, likely extended until the reign of Ramesses II, just as the Saqqara and Ramesseum king lists. On this basis, the Turin King List probably listed at least 27 additional rulers: nine of Dynasty XVII, fifteen of Dynasty XVIII, and the first three kings of Dynasty XIX, yielding a minimum total of 250 kings.

The papyrus also contains several lacunae, explicit gaps marked by the Ramesside scribes when names in their sources were illegible. Ryholt estimates that these lacunae represent at least 12 missing kings: six for Dynasty XIII, and at least six for Dynasty XIV. In addition, there is a lacuna in Column 5.15 that very likely corresponds to Manetho's Dynasty VII, consisting of 10 additional kings recorded only in the Abydos King List. There are also two instances of fictitious kings, both in Dynasty IV (likely Manetho's Bikheris and Thamphthis). Taking this into account, the total rises to at least 227 kings up to the end of Dynasty XVI, 243 up to the end of the Abydos Dynasty, and 270 until Ramesses II. Even these figures likely remain conservative, since a small number of ephemeral or disputed rulers —such as Sneferka or Ba at the end of Dynasty I— were probably omitted altogether.

Including the subsequent periods of native and foreign rule, the total of kings reaches more than 300 before the first Persian conquest, which closely aligns with Herodotus' statement that, following Menes, Egypt was ruled by "three hundred and thirty kings, whose names the priests recited from a papyrus roll".^{:100} (Note: Herodotus states that Egypt was ruled by 330 kings until Sesostris, yet several kings in his narrative—such as Sesostris himself—appear to be unhistorical. Elsewhere, he reports that Egyptian priests told him that the interval between Min (Menes) and Sethos (Shebitku) comprised "three hundred and forty-one generations of men," equated with the same number of kings and high priests, totaling 11,340 years by Herodotus' own calculations.^{:142} These figures are highly problematic; the number of 341 kings appears to be a simple addition of the 330 kings mentioned earlier and the 11 rulers listed by Herodotus before Sethos. However, some of these rulers correspond to pharaohs of the Old Kingdom, which chronologically belong to some of Egypt's earliest dynasties. Their placement after the period supposedly spanning hundreds of kings indicates a fundamental misunderstanding of the data provided by the priests, and the reference to a single papyrus containing the entire list further suggests that this figure was intended to represent the total number of pharaohs before the Persian conquest.) Manetho's own total of kings is roughly 360 kings in 5470 years, but the sum of individual reigns amounts to more than 500 kings in 5370 years. (Note: For Manetho's first two books, Julius Africanus records 192 kings in 2300 years and 96 kings in 2121 years, respectively. Book III lists 64 kings, totaling 361 kings in 5471 years. However, the actual sum of kings and years gives roughly 511 kings in 5368 years. As noted before, the stated totals often disagree with the actual sum of items. Ultimately, none of the years given by Africanus nor Eusebius are useful, as Manetho originally recorded both years and months (see the comparison table below the Eighteenth Dynasty section).) Diodorus Siculus writes that mortal kings have ruled Egypt for "a little less than five thousand years".

=== Royal names and titulature ===
The first Egyptian kings were known by their Horus name (serekh), with additional Nebty and Golden Horus honorifics. From the late First Dynasty onwards, kings began to use a throne name known in English as the prenomen (nswt-bjtj or nisut-bity, "Sedge and Bee"), which was the main name used during the Fourth Dynasty as well as the royal name found in most king-lists. The next dynasty introduced the nomen (Sa-Ra, "son of Ra"), which is often understood as a personal name. This is the name used by scholars after the Fifth Dynasty, as well as the name used by Manetho for most pharaohs. Given the confusing nature of royal names, only kings who are recorded with their two cartouche names (prenomen and nomen) can be securely identified. Throne names assigned to pre-Fifth Dynasty pharaohs are sometimes referred to as "personal names" by scholars, as there was probably no distinction between throne and personal names at the time. For a listing and description of all royal names, from Predynastic to Ptolemaic times, see Leprohon 2013.

== Protodynastic period ==
The Protodynastic period of Egypt spans from the formation of the first Egyptian states about 3300 BC to about 3000 BC, when Egypt was first unified as a single kingdom by the rulers of Upper Egypt. Before this, both Lower and Upper Egypt were divided into several small kingdoms. The terms "Lower Egypt" and "Upper Egypt" are based on the direction of the Nile's flow, which is north. Consequently, "Lower Egypt" is located north (downstream), while "Upper Egypt" is located south (upstream).

=== Lower Egypt ===
Lower Egypt geographically consists of the northern Nile and the Nile delta.

The Palermo Stone mentions 14 predynastic pharaohs by their Horus name from Lower Egypt. These may be mythical kings or semi-gods preserved through oral tradition, or posthumous names of earlier pharaohs. The original document likely contained rulers for Upper Egypt as well.

(#) – Existence disputed

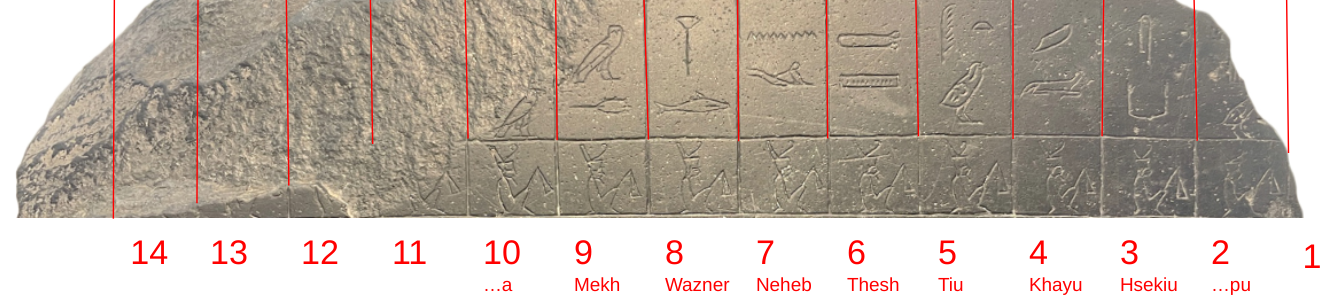

#	Name	Notes
1	Name destroyed	
2	[...]pu	Only known from the Palermo Stone.
3	Hsekiu	Only known from the Palermo Stone.
4	Khayu	Only known from the Palermo Stone.
5	Tiu	Only known from the Palermo Stone.
6	Thesh	Only known from the Palermo Stone.
7	Neheb	Only known from the Palermo Stone.
8	Wazner	Only known from the Palermo Stone.
9	Mekh	Only known from the Palermo Stone.
10	[...]a	Only known from the Palermo Stone.
11	Names destroyed	
12	Names destroyed	
13	Names destroyed	
14	Names destroyed	

Other rulers include:

Image	Name	Notes
	Double Falcon	A symbol found in Southern Palestine, Northwest Sinai, East Delta, Tura (Cairo, near Memphis), and even Abydos (Upper Egypt). May represent a generic royal title.
	Hedju-Hor	A symbol found in Tura, and the eastern Nile Delta. Disputed reading, Hornung called him "Trio", while Wilkinson used a placeholder name.
	Ny-Hor	A symbol found in Tura. Thought by some to be a different rendering of the name "Narmer", more likely a predynastic ruler.
	Hat-Hor	A symbol found in Tarkhan, Cairo. Thought by some to be a different rendering of the name "Narmer", may not be a royal name.
	Ni-Neith	A symbol found in Helwan, Cairo. Reading of name is uncertain.
	[...]-Neith	An anonymous serekh found in el-Beda. The reading and rank of the name is disputed, with Clédat reading the name reads as "Ka-Neith" and was a queen, and Raffaele reading the name as "Bark-Neith," but does not take a stance on the rank.
–	Hut-Hor	Recorded on two pottery fragments found in Tell el-Farkha and Umm el-Balad respectively. The name's reading has been suggested as both "Ḥr-Ḥw.t" and "Ḥw.t-Ḥr", the latter interpretation may refer to the goddess Hathor.
	Crocodile	A symbol found in Tarkhan and Abydos; identity and existence are disputed.
	Wash	Probably from Buto; potentially a name in the Narmer Palette. Some disagree and argue that the Palette is only symbolic.

=== Upper Egypt ===
Upper Egypt refers to the region up-river to the south of Lower Egypt. There were at least three polities by the Naqada II period (c. 3500 BC): Thinis (with its cemetery at Abydos), Naqada and Hierakonpolis.

(#) – Existence disputed

Image	Name	Notes
	A	Only known from a graffiti discovered in the Western Desert in 2004.
–	Finger Snail	The existence of this king is very doubtful.
–	Fish	Only known from artifacts that bear his mark.
	Elephant	Also called "Pe" or "Pen"; may not be a king.
–	Stork	Perhaps a ruler attested in Tomb U-j, Abydos.
–	Taurus	Perhaps a ruler attested in the Bull Palette.
	Scorpion I	Perhaps a ruler attested in Tomb U-j, Abydos.
–	Falcon	Placeholder names proposed by Günter Dreyer, but this is disputed.
–	"Min standard + plant"	Placeholder names proposed by Günter Dreyer, but this is disputed.
–	"N.2"	Placeholder names proposed by Günter Dreyer, but this is disputed.
–	"N.3"	Placeholder names proposed by Günter Dreyer, but this is disputed.
–	Lion	Placeholder names proposed by Günter Dreyer, but this is disputed.
–	Hor B	Placeholder name, possibly the same as Ka.
	Iry-Hor	Alternatively Ra; possibly ruled before King Ka. His tomb was discovered in 2012.
	Ka	Alternatively Sechen. Correct chronological position unclear.
	Scorpion II	Known for the Scorpion Macehead. Waged war in the Delta and possibly began the unification of Egypt. Replaced the capital of Hierakonpolis with Thinis. Perhaps the same ruler as Scorpion I. (Note: There is some confusion on the exact identity of the king depicted in the Scorpion Macehead. Hornung, Krauss & Warburton 2006, p. 91 refer to this king as "Scorpion I" and Bunson 2002, p. 356 adds that he "was followed by an obscure Scorpion II". According to Günter Dreyer, the Scorpion (I) buried in U-j is a different king from the Scorpion (II) of the macehead, with the former ruling before Iry-Hor. This ruler is otherwise referred to simply as "Scorpion".)

While the early dynasties were aware of their pre-dynastic history, this appears to have been all but forgotten by the Ramesside period. Later sources refer to the Menes/Narmer as the first "human king", succeeding the gods that ruled Egypt for times immemorial. Later tradition also identified him as the founder of Memphis, when in fact the city had existed since before the reign of Iry-Hor.

== Early Dynastic period (c. 3100–2700 BC) ==
The sole "contemporary" source for early dynastic chronology is the Palermo Stone and its associated fragments. The Turin King List, is not considered reliable for this period, as it often contradicts contemporary sources. The annals are badly damaged, and only a few names are explicitly recorded, leading to several and divergent reconstructions over the decades. Unless otherwise noted, the reconstruction follows Hornung, Krauss & Warburton 2006. (Note: It is virtually impossible to establish the exact chronology of the early dynasties. According to Hornung, the First Dynasty lasted a minimum of 150 years, and only the reigns of Aha and Narmer remain unspecified. None of Manetho's figures match the historical records and hence must be discarded. The chronology of the Second Dynasty is even more uncertain because Egypt was divided during most of its duration. The Turin King List does not acknowledge co-regencies for the Twelfth Dynasty, and thus likely did not for the Second Dynasty either. This must have resulted in an inflated total of years, meaning that the "955 years" given for the duration of the first eight dynasties must also be inflated.) Lastly, it's worth noting that virtually all transliterations are just approximations (Egyptian is an extinct language); certain spellings may change depending on the author.

=== First Dynasty ===
Ancient sources, including Manetho, assign eight rulers to the First Dynasty, a fact confirmed by the records in the necropolis of Qa'a, the last pharaoh. The tombs of all pharaohs, including queen Merneith, are located in the necropolis of Umm El Qa'ab, Abydos. The first two dynasties originated from the lost city of Thinis, and ruled from Memphis according to later traditions.

Manetho correctly assigns eight kings to this dynasty, but his order and naming are troublesome. (Note: Den's throne name Khasty was misread in later times as Qenqen, leading to Manetho's Kenkenes. The same signs for Khasty could be alternatively read as Semty (or Sepaty). This is likely the origin of Manetho's Ousaphaidos (after Hesepty). The name Ouenephes probably derives from Όννωφρις (Ónnofris), a synonym for the god Osiris, who was associated with Djer's tomb. Thus, the correct order of the first 5 pharaohs should be Menes → Athotis → Ouenephes → (Djet) → Kenkenes, the latter being the same as Ousaphaidos. Whether the regnal years are also mixed is uncertain.) Ramesside king lists, made 1000 years later, identify all eight kings with throne names, but none of them match contemporary records. Throne names were introduced by the fifth king, so the first names must be later additions, possibly posthumous epithets. (Note: The name Meni, for instance, means "He who endures", likely referring to his position as the supposed founder of Egypt. Others appear to be corruptions or misreadings. Djer's supposed throne name, Itti, does appear in the Palermo Stone, but it is rendered as a Golden Horus name.) As noted before, the dynasty must have begun c. 3100 BC, ± 150 years.

Proposed dates: c. 3007–2828 (179 years), c. 2920–2770 (150 years), c. 3000–2750 (250 years), c. 3000–2890 (110 years), c. 2900–2730 (170 years)

(#) – Status ambiguous

#	Image	Horus name	Throne name (Note: Throne names for the first three dynasties follow those found in the official king lists of the New Kingdom. However, none of them match contemporary records and are mostly corruptions or misreadings. Original throne names are given in small brackets.)	Notes	Reign (Note: The figures for the early dynasties correspond to regnal years, which denote accession-based counting and do not necessarily correspond to full calendar years of rule.)
1		Narmer	Meni	Began his rule as king of Upper Egypt; finished the unification of Egypt. Recorded as Meni in the Ramesside lists, and is called Menes by Manetho. (Note: The Greek historians Herodotus (c. 450 BC) and Diodorus Siculus (c. 50 BC) give two similar variants of the name: Min and Menas, respectively.^{:99}^{:45}) His name is attested as far as modern Israel. According to Manetho, he was killed by a hippopotamus after ruling 62 years.	–
2		Aha	Teti	Thought by some scholars to be the first pharaoh. Campaigned as far as Nubia, modern Sudan. According to radiocarbon dating studies, his reign likely began c. 3111–3045 BC, but possibly about a century earlier. Recorded as Teti in the Ramesside lists. Manetho calls him Athotís.	–
*		Neithhotep♀	–	Mother of Aha and wife to Narmer, thought by some authors to have ruled early in Djer's reign, perhaps as co-ruler.	–
3		Djer	Iti	His tomb was later thought to be the tomb of Osiris, god of the afterlife. Recorded as Iti in the Ramesside lists. One of the few kings to be directly named in the Royal Annals, which gives Iti as his Golden Horus name. Manetho calls him Uenéphes.	c. 47 years
4		Djet	Ita	Also known as "Serpent"; recorded as Ita in the Ramesside lists. Manetho calls him Usapháis.	c. 10 years
*		Merneith♀	–	Mother of Den and likely the wife of Djet; almost certainly ruled as regent during Den's minority, although she is sometimes considered a ruler in her own right.	–
5		Den	Sepati (Khasty)	Most documented pharaoh of the dynasty. Introduced the prenomen and double crown. Celebrated two Sed festivals, indicating a long reign. Succeeded as a child and began his reign under the regency of his mother Merneith. His campaigns in the northeast are attested on the Palermo Stone, which also records a national census. His prenomen Khasty was later misread as Septi and Qenti. Manetho calls him Kénkenes.	c. 42 years
6		Anedjib	Merybiapen (Merybiap)	The Turin King List gives him a lifespan of 74 years, which would place his accession at age 66. Perhaps co-ruled with his father and/or succeeded at a late age, as he had an implausible Sed festival. His prenomen Merybiap was later misread as Merybiapen and Merygeregipen. Manetho calls him Miebidós.	c. 8 years
7		Semerkhet	Semsu (Iry)	His full reign is preserved on the Palermo Stone. The Turin King List gives him a lifespan of 72 years, which would place his accession at age 64. His prenomen Iry was later misread as Semsu and Semsen. Manetho calls him Semempsés.	8 1/2 years
8		Qa'a	Qebeh (Qa'a)	Celebrated two Sed festivals. The Turin King List gives him a lifespan of 63 years, which would place his accession at age 30. His Horus name was later corrupted into Qebeh. Last pharaoh to have human sacrifices dedicated to him. Manetho calls him Bienéches.	c. 33 years
The position and identity of the following pharaohs is unknown:
*		Sneferka	–	Two obscure names associated with the end of Qaa's reign. Correct chronological position unknown, perhaps ephemeral rivals, usurpers, or alternative names of previous (or later) pharaohs.	?
*		Bird / Ba	–	Two obscure names associated with the end of Qaa's reign. Correct chronological position unknown, perhaps ephemeral rivals, usurpers, or alternative names of previous (or later) pharaohs.	?

Comparison of royal lists:

Historical pharaoh	Ramesside king lists			Aegyptiaca						Royal Annals			
Historical pharaoh	Abydos	Saqqara	Turin	Africanus			Eusebius			Hornung	Wilkinson	CAH	Helck
Narmer	Meni	–	Meni	Μηνης	Menes	62	Μηνης	Menes	60	–	–	–	32 years
Aha	Teti	–	Teti	Aθωθις	Athothis	57	Aθωθις	Athothis	27	–	–	–	1 year
Djer	Iti	–	Iti	Κενκενης	Kenkenes	31	Κενκενης	Kenkenes	39	47 years	41 years	47 years	54 years
Djet	Ita	–	[...]tui	Ουενεφης	Ouenephes	23	Ουενεφης	Ouenephes	42	10 years	–	–	11 years
Den Khasty	Septi	–	Qenti	Ουσαφαιδoς	Ousaphaidos	20	Ουσαφαης	Ousaphais	20	42 years	32 years	55–60 years	43 years
Adjib Merybiap	Meribiap	Meribiapen	Merigeregipen	Μιεβιδoς	Miebidos	26	Nιεβαης	Niebais	26	8 years	10 years	7 years	11 years
Semerkhet Iry	Semsu	–	Semsen	Σεμεμψης	Semempses	18	Σεμεμψης	Semempses	18	9 years	9 years	8 years	9 years
Qa'a	Qebeh	Qebehu	Qebeh	Βιηνεχης	Bienekhes	26	Ουβιενθης	Oubienthes	26	33 years	–	25 years	33 years
				253 years (actually 263)			252 years (actually 258)			150+ years	100+ years	140+ years	185 years

=== Second Dynasty ===
The following table follows the royal records of the Saqqara and Turin lists, which coincide with Manetho in recording nine kings. Following the reign of Nynetjer, the country was split and remained so until the reign of Khasekhemwy. The five Ramesside names between Nynetjer and Khasekhemwy cannot be securely correlated with contemporary rulers, leading to much confusion in the correct identification of rulers. The tombs of the first three pharaohs were found in Saqqara, while those of Seth-Peribsen and Khasekhemwy were found in Umm El Qa'ab.

Proposed dates: c. 2828–2682 (146 years), c. 2770–2649 BC (121 years), c. 2750–2650 BC (100 years), c. 2890–2686 (204 years), c. 2730–2590 BC (140 years)

#	Image	Horus name	Throne name	Notes	Reign
1		Hotepsekhemwy	Bedjau (Hotep)	Chose to be buried at Saqqara to be closer to the capital. His Horus name was misread as Bedjau during the 5th dynasty. Manetho calls him Boethos, and says that during his reign, a chasm opened at Bubastus. The Turin King List gives him 95 years, likely his lifespan, which would imply his accession occurred at age 66–70. (Note: The names of Hotepsekhemwy and Nynetjer, albeit written with different characters, are both pronounced as Baunetjer in the Turin list. They are both given a lifespan of 95 years, which implies a duplication mistake. The Giza list of the Old Kingdom recorded Hotep's name as "Bedjau", likely a corruption of his Horus name, while the Ramesside Abydos list corrupted Nynetjer's name into "Banetjer". The Saqqara list further corrupted "Bedjau" into "Baunetjer", which lead to the Turin list recording both kings with similar sounding names (b3w-nṯr and b3-n-nṯr).)	c. 25–29 years
2		Nebra	Kakau (Weneg?)	Called Raneb in older scholarship. Recorded under the name Kakau in the Ramesside lists. Manetho calls him Kaiekhos. Thought by some scholars to be the Horus name of Weneg.	c. 10–14 years
3		Nynetjer	Banetjer (Nynetjer)	Egypt was divided by the end of his reign. His name was later misread as Banetjer. Known to have put down a rebellion in his 13th year. Manetho calls him Binothris. The Turin King List gives him 95 years, likely his lifespan, which would imply his accession occurred at age 55.	40 years
The following names are only attested in Ramesside lists:
4		–	Wadjenes	The Turin King List gives him a lifespan of 70 years. Manetho states that Wadjenes ruled for 17 years. Thus, Turin and Manetho combined imply that Wadjenes ascended to the throne at age 53. Thought by some scholars to be the same as Weneg, or Seth-Peribsen. Manetho calls him Tlas.	–
5		–	Senedj	The Turin King List gives him a lifespan of 54 years. Manetho states that Senedj (Sethenes) ruled for 41 years. Thus, Turin and Manetho combined imply that he ascended to the throne at age 13. While poorly attested in contemporary sources, he developed a cult following that survived up until the 26th Dynasty, c. 600 BC. Thought by some scholars to be the same person as either Horus Sa or Seth-Peribsen.	–
6		–	Neferkare I	The Turin King List gives him a lifespan of 70 years. Manetho states that Neferkara (Khaires) ruled for 17 years. Thus, Turin and Manetho combined imply that Neferkara ascended to the throne at age 53. Ryholt proposes that "Neferkara" is a misreading of Sneferka, who ruled at the end of the First Dynasty. Excluded from the Abydos King List for unknown reasons.	–
7		–	Neferkasokar	Reigned 8 years and 3 months according to the Turin King List, lifespan damaged. One reconstruction of the damaged lifespan in the list would give him a lifespan of 30 years, implying that Neferkasokar ascended to the throne at age 22. Excluded from the Abydos King List for unknown reasons. Manetho calls him Nephercheres, and says that there is a legend that under his reign, the Nile flowed blended with honey for 11 days.	–
8		–	"Hudjefa I"	Name lost but still included in king lists as Hudjefa (meaning "missing" or "erased"). The Turin King List gives him a reign of 11 years, 8 months, and 4 days, and a lifespan of 34 years, which would place his accession at age 22. Excluded from the Abydos King List for unknown reasons. Manetho calls him Sesôchris.	–
The position and identity of the following pharaohs is unknown:
*		Ba	–	Name found beneath the Pyramid of Djoser, in Lower Egypt. According to Nabil Swelim, his name may have been intermingled with the Ramesside name of Nynetjer (Banetjer).	–
*		–	Weneg	Attested in the Pyramid of Djoser, as well as a tomb from Saqqara. Possibly the prenomen of Nebra.	–
*		–	Nubnefer	Attested on two vessel fragments from the Pyramid of Djoser associated with the reign of Nynetjer.	–
*		Seth-Peribsen	Peribsen	Tomb found at Abydos, attested only in Upper Egypt. His serekh notably features Set, not Horus. May have been Nynetjer's direct successor in Upper Egypt. His name notably appears alongside Senedj in a tomb dating to the Fourth Dynasty.	c. 10 years
*		Sekhemib-Perenmaat		Probably ruled in Upper Egypt.	–
*		Sa	–	Attested on a few vessels from the Pyramid of Djoser. May be Senedj or Nubnefer.	–
With the last ruler, the sources and king lists return to an agreement:
9		Khasekhemwy	Bebety (Khastwy)	His serekh name is unique for presenting both Horus and Set, possibly indicating the end of a religious strife that began under Seth-Peribsen. Likely began as king of Upper Egypt (under the name Khasekhem) before reuniting the two lands by his 13th year on the throne. He was one of Egypt's first master builders, best known for his funerary enclosure, the Shunet El Zebib. His Horus name was later misread as Djadjay and Bebety. Manetho calls him Kheneres. Died at the age of 40 according to the Turin King List, which would place his accession at age 23 and the reunification of Egypt at age 36.	17 1/2 years (Note: As recorded in the Palermo Stone. The Turin King List gives him a reign of 27 years, 2 months and 1 day, and a lifespan of 40 years (i.e. he would have started his reign at the age of 13 according to the Turin List). The "27 years" figure must be a corruption of "17 years", thus we must assume he started his reign at the age of 23 instead.)

Comparison of royal lists

Ancient
Historical pharaoh	Giza (5th dynasty)	Abydos (19th)	Saqqara (19th)	Turin (19th)			Aegyptiaca						Royal Annals		
Historical pharaoh	Giza (5th dynasty)	Abydos (19th)	Saqqara (19th)	Name	Reign	Lifespan	Africanus			Eusebius			Hornung	Wilkinson	Helck
Hotepsekhemwy	Bedjau	Bedjau	Baunetjer	[Bau]netjer	[...]	95y	Βoηθoς	Boethos	38	Βωχος	Bochos	–	–		39 years
Nebra	–	Kakau	Kakau	Kakau	[...]	[...]	Καιεχως	Kaiekhos	39	Χωος	Choös	–	–		39 years
Nynetjer	–	Banetjer	Banetjeru	Bau[netjer]	[...]	95y	Βίνωθρις	Binothris	47	Βίοφις	Biophis	–	40 years		45 years
unknown	–	Wadjnas	Wadjlas	[Wadjne]s	[...]	70y	Τλας	Tlas	17	–	–	–	–		33 years
unknown	–	Sendi	Senedj	Senedj	[...]	54y	Σεθενης	Sethenes	41	–	–	–	–		33 years
unknown	–	–	Neferkara	Aaka	[...]	70y	Χαιρης	Khaires	17	–	–	–	–		33 years
unknown	–	–	Neferkasokar	Neferkasokar	8y, 3m	[...]	Nεφερχερης	Nephercheres	25	–	–	–	–		8
unknown	–	–	Hudjefa I	Hudjefa	11y, 8m, 4d	34y	Σεσωχρις	Sesochris	48	Σεσωχρις	Sesochris	48	–		12
Khasekhemwy	–	Djadjay	Bebti	Bebti	27y, 2m, 1d	40y	Χενερης	Kheneres	30	–	–	–	18 years		–
							302 years			297 years					
							Dynasties I–II, 555 years (actual sum is 565 years)			Dynasties I–II, 549 years (actual sum is 555 years)					

Modern
Beckerath 1999	UCL 2000	Clayton 2001	Bunson 2002	Shaw 2003	Hornung et al. 2006
1. Hotepsekhemwy; 2. Nebra; 3. Ninetjer; 4. Weneg; 5. Sened; 6. Sekhemib; 7. Peribsen; 8. Neferkara; 9. Neferkasokar; 10. Hudjefa I 11. Khasekhemwy	1. Hotepsekhemwy; 2. Raneb; 3. Ninetjer; 4. Sekhemib; 5. Peribsen; 6. Sened; 7. Weneg; 8. Khasekhem(wy)	1. Hotepsekhemwy; 2. Raneb; 3. Ninetjer; 4. Peribsen; 5. Khasekhemwy	1. Hotepsekhemwy; 2. Re'neb; 3. Ninetjer; 4. Weneg; 5. Peribsen; 6. Sendji; 7. Neferka; 8. Neferkara; 9. Kha'sekhemwy	1. Hetepsekhemwy; 2. Raneb; 3. Nynetjer; 4. Weneg; 5. Sened; 6. Peribsen; 7. Khasekhemwy	1. Hetep-sekhemwy; 2. Ra'-neb; 3. Ny-netjer; 4. Per-ibsen; 5. Sekhem-ib; 6. Sened; 7. Kha-sekhemwy

== Old Kingdom (c. 2700–2200 BC) ==
The history of ancient Egypt is divided into three "golden ages" (Old, Middle, and New Kingdom), interspersed between three periods of fragmentation known as "intermediate periods". The capital during the period of the Old Kingdom was also Memphis. According to radiocarbon dating, the Old Kingdom began sometime around the mid-27th century BC, possibly between 2676 and 2643 BC, but with more certainty between 2691 and 2625 BC.

=== Third Dynasty ===
Ancient sources assign five rulers to the Third Dynasty, but there is uncertainty regarding their exact order and chronology. Both the Turin and Abydos king lists claim that the Third Dynasty was founded by Nebka, hence his position in some modern lists. However, archeological evidence has shown that the founder was in fact Djoser, who is correctly identified as its first king in the Saqqara Tablet. The dynasty ruled 74 years according to the Turin King List, but its numbers do not match with the earlier Palermo Stone; the actual duration may be as low as 50 years.

Proposed dates: c. 2682–2614 BC (68 years), c. 2649–2575 BC (74 years), c. 2686–2600 BC (86 years), c. 2686–2613 BC (73 years), c. 2592–2544 BC (48 years)

#	Image	Horus name	Throne name	Notes	Reign
1		Netjerikhet	Djoser	Best known under his posthumous name of Djoser; (Note: Besides the Ramesside lists of Dynasty XIX, the name "Djoser" is also attested in a monument erected by Senusret II of Dynasty XII, as well as in the Westcar Papyrus of Dynasty XIII.) recorded in contemporary sources as Netjerikhet. Possibly a son of Khasekhemwy. Commissioned the first Pyramid, created by chief architect Imhotep, who was later deified. According to radiocarbon dating, his reign began in the range of 2691–2625 BC.	28–29 years (Note: According to Wilkinson, the Palermo Stone records 28 complete or partial years for Djoser, which closely matches Manetho's figure of "29 years". The Turin King List gives "19 years", which is too short; Khasekhemwy's reign was similarly changed from "17 years" to "27 years". Ramesside scribes may have erroneously attributed the first 10 years of Djoser's reign to Khasekhemwy.)
2		Sekhemkhet	Teti	Commissioned the Buried Pyramid, which was left unfinished due to his short reign.	7 years (Note: As recorded in the Palermo Stone and Manetho (who calls him Tyreis, after his posthumous name Teti). The Turin King List records 6 years and x months and repeats the same figure for his successor, which may or may not be another copyist mistake.)
3		Sanakht (?)	Nebka	Almost certainly the Horus name of Nebka, the 3rd ruler in the Saqqara Tablet. Sometimes placed 4th. The Turin King List places Nebka and Djoser as the first pharaohs and gives them the same reign length, which is likely a copyist error.	c. 24 years
4		Khaba (?)	"Sedjes" "Hudjefa II"	Ramesside sources do not give the name of the 4th ruler, instead using the placeholder Sedjes and Hudjefa. It may refer to Horus-Khaba (although some scholars link that name with Huni). Commissioned the unfinished Layer Pyramid during his short reign.	c. 24 years
5		Qahedjet (?)	Huni	First well-attested throne name; identified by Wilkinson as Qahedjet. Commissioned the Meidum Pyramid.	c. 24 years

Comparison of royal lists:

Giza (5th dynasty)	Abydos (19th)	Saqqara (19th)	Turin (19th)		Manetho (33rd)					
Giza (5th dynasty)	Abydos (19th)	Saqqara (19th)	Turin (19th)		Aricanus			Eusebius		
–	Nebka	Djoser	Nebka	19y [...]	Nεχερoφης	Necherophes	28	Νεχερωχις	Necherochis	–
–	Djeser-za	Djoser-teti	Djoser-it	19y, 1m	Toσoρθρoς	Tosorthros	29	Σεσορθος	Sesorthos	–
Teti	Teti	Nebkare	Djoser-ti	6y,[...]	Tυρεις	Tyreis	7	–	"The remaining six accomplished nothing worthy of mention"	
–	Sedjes	–	Hudjefa II	6y [...]	Nεχερoφης	Mesochris	17	–	"The remaining six accomplished nothing worthy of mention"	
–	Neferkara	Huni	Hu(ni)	24y	Σωυφις	Soyphis	16	–	"The remaining six accomplished nothing worthy of mention"	
			74 years total		Toσερτασις	Tosertasis	19	–	"The remaining six accomplished nothing worthy of mention"	
					Aχης	Aches	42	–	"The remaining six accomplished nothing worthy of mention"	
					Σηφoνρις	Sephouris	30	–	"The remaining six accomplished nothing worthy of mention"	
					Kερφερης	Kerpheres (Note: Mesochris and Soyphis appear to be duplicated names from Dynasty IV (Mencheres and Souphis), while Tosertasis appears to be a duplicate of Tesorthros. The next names Aches, Sephouris and Kerpheres, are of unknown origin, but may as well be duplicates.)	26			
					214 years			198 years		
					Dynasties I–III, 769 years (actual sum is 779 years)			Dynasties I–III, 747 years (actual sum is 753 years)		

=== Fourth Dynasty ===
The Fourth Dynasty is renowned for its colossal monuments and pyramids, most notably the Great Pyramid of Giza, one of the Seven Wonders of the Ancient World. While the first four kings are well attested, there is some uncertainty regarding the successors of Khafre in later sources. However, the tomb of Sekhemkare, vizier and son of Khafre, records the correct succession from Khafre to Sahure. Sekhemkare supposedly lived under five pharaohs, which implies that the latter kings did not reign long. Some tales of this period were recorded by the Greek historian Herodotus, although he notably places it after the New Kingdom period.

The exact chronology of this dynasty is disputed, as scholars disagree whether cattle counts were made annually or biennially at this time. The following numbers assume most were annual.

Proposed dates: c. 2614–2479 BC (135 years), c. 2575–2465 BC (110 years), c. 2600–2450 BC (150 years), c. 2613–2494 BC (119 years), c. 2543–2436 BC (107 years)

(#) – Existence disputed
(#) – Status ambiguous

#	Image	Horus name	Throne name	Notes	Reign
1		Nebmaat	Sneferu	Possibly a son of Huni; reigned long enough to complete the Meidum, Bent, and Red Pyramids. Campaigned into Libya, Nubia, and the Sinai. Cartouche names were standardized during his reign. According to radiocarbon dating, his reign began in the range of 2649–2582 BC.	c. 30 years (Note: A minimum of 24 years can be deduced from his cattle counts, but other evidence points to a minimum reign of 27 years. The Turin King List precisely gives him 24 years, but this is considered too short. According to one reconstruction of the Annals, he reigned for a minimum of 34 years. Some argue that he reigned up to 50 years.)
2		Medjedu	Khufu	Son of Sneferu; builder of the Great Pyramid of Giza and protagonist of the 13th-dynasty Westcar Papyrus. Fought campaigns in the Sinai and initiated several building projects around Memphis. Also known by the Hellenized name Cheops by Herodotus, who describes him as a tyrant. According to radiocarbon dating, his reign began in the range of 2629–2558 BC.	c. 30 years (Note: Perhaps 26 years; a recent finding suggests that he died shortly before completing 30 years. Turin records 23 years, Herodotus 50, Africanus 63.)
3		Khepri	Djedefre	His name is alternatively read as Radjedef. Son of Khufu; first pharaoh to use a nomen. He also commissioned a pyramid at Abu Rawash, which was never fully completed.	c. 10 years
4		Userib	Khafre	Brother of Djedefre; his pyramid is the second largest in Giza. Believed to be the builder of the Great Sphinx. His funerary complex was the largest at the Giza plateau. Herodotus calls him Chephren and mistakenly refers to him as Khufu's brother.	Over 20 years
5		Kakhet	Menkaure	Son of Khafre; his pyramid is the third and smallest in Giza. His sarcophagus was lost at sea while being shipped to Europe. Herodotus calls him Mycerinus, and refers to him as a son of Khufu (rather than his grandson).	Disputed c. 18 years (?) (Note: The Turin King List records 18 or 28 years, and contemporary evidence points to at least 11 years. However, Hornung argues that his reconstruction the Palermo Stone gives him a short reign of only 6 years, which also coincides with Herodotus' figure.)
6		Shepsekhet	Shepseskaf	Son of Menkaure; finished his father's pyramid and mortuary complex. Commissioned the Tomb of Mastabat al-Fir'aun, Saqqara, which was left unfinished. He was possibly succeeded by his wife Khentkaus I as regent. According to radiocarbon dating, his reign began in the range of 2556–2476 BC.	c. 6 years
*	–	–	Bikheris	Recorded by Manetho as the sixth king, most likely Baufra, son of Khafre. Recorded in the short Wadi Hammamat king list (12th dynasty) as a successor of Khafre alongside Djedefhor, son of Khufu. Contemporary sources only refer to them as princes, so their inclusion must be an error.	–
*	–	–	Thamphthis	Recorded by Manetho as the eighth and final king. The Turin King List likewise records eight pharaohs, possibly other sons of Khufu. The Saqqara Tablet notably records nine kings, but only the first four names are preserved.	–
*		–	Khentkaus I♀	Queen of Egypt who is attested with title that can be translated as "mother of two kings of Upper and Lower Egypt" or "mother of king of Upper Egypt and Lower Egypt, King of Upper and Lower Egypt". The latter interpretation would mean she became pharaoh in her own right.	–

Comparison of royal lists:

Pharaoh	Sekhemkare (5th dynasty)	Wadi Hammamat (12th dynasty)	Ramesside (18–19th)				Herodotus (27th dynasty)		Manetho (33rd dynasty)		Reign Years			
Pharaoh	Sekhemkare (5th dynasty)	Wadi Hammamat (12th dynasty)	Karnak	Abydos	Saqqara	Turin	Herodotus (27th dynasty)		Manetho (33rd dynasty)		Turin	Herod.	Afr.	Eusb.
Sneferu	–	–	Sneferu	Sneferu	Sneferu	Snofer(u)	Rhampsinit	–	1. Soris	Σωρις	24	–	29	–
Khufu	–	Khufu	Khufu	Khufu	Khufu	Name lost	Cheops	Χεοπα	2. Souphis I	Σoυφις	23	50	63	–
Djedefre	–	Djedefre	–	Djedefre	Djedefre	Name lost	–	–	5. Rhatoises	Ρατoισης	8	–	25	–
Khafre	Khafra	Khafra	–	Khafre	Khafre	Kha[...]	Chephren	Χεφρηνα	3. Souphis II	Σoυφις	Lost	56	66	–
Menkaure	Menkaura	Djedefhor	–	Menkaure	Name lost	Name lost	Mycerinus	Μυκερινον	4. Menkeres	Μενχερης	28	6	63	–
Bikheris	–	Baufra	–	–	Name lost	Name lost	–	–	6. Bikheres	Bιχερης	Lost	–	22	–
Shepseskaf	Shepseskaf	–	–	Shepseskaf	Name lost	Name lost	–	–	7. Seberkheres	Σεβερχερης	4	–	7	–
Thamphthis	–	–	–	–	Name lost	Name lost	–	–	8. Thamphthis (Note: Eusebius records 17 kings but mentions only Suphis (Khufu). Africanus gives the first three kings as Sneferu, Khufu, and Khafre, all of which were buried in the Giza pyramid complex. This suggests that Manetho's source was already corrupted or misread, as the three are given similar names (Soris/Souphis) and a reign length of about 60 years each (the number was likely the sum of several kings). The name "Suphis" (Σoυφις) is likely a corruption of "Kuphis" (Χoυφις).)	Θαμφθις	2	–	9	–
–	–	–	–	–	Name lost	–	–	–			90+		277 (284)	448
									Africanus: Dyn. I–IV, 1046 years (actual sum is 1063 years)					
Eusebius: Dyn. I–IV, 1195 years (actual sum is 1201 years)

=== Fifth Dynasty ===
Starting with the reign of Neferirkare Kakai, pharaohs became mainly known by two names, a regnal (prenomen) and personal (nomen) name. The pharaohs of the Sixth Dynasty onwards are generally known by their nomen alone.

All variants of Manetho refer to the Fifth Dynasty as "kings from Elephantine". This is probably a misreading of "Sakhebu", a city near Heliopolis that was likely the hometown of Userkaf.

Proposed dates: c. 2479–2322 BC (157 years), c. 2465–2323 BC (142 years), c. 2450–2300 BC (150 years), c. 2494–2345 BC (149 years), c. 2435–2306 BC (129 years)

(#) – Status ambiguous

#	Image	Throne name	Personal name	Notes	Reign
1		Userkaf		Possibly a great-grandson of Khufu; buried in his pyramid in Saqqara. Built the first Egyptian sun temple at Abusir. First confirmed instance of biennial cattle counts. According to radiocarbon dating, his reign began in the range of 2548–2468 BC.	8 years
2		Sahure		Moved the royal necropolis to Abusir, where he built his pyramid. Launched several naval expeditions and conducted expeditions to the land of Punt.	13 years
3		Neferirkare	Kakai	Son of Sahure; Commissioned a pyramid at Abusir, but was not able to finish it.	10–11 years
4		Shepseskare	Netjeruser	Believed by most scholars to be the successor of Kakai. Excluded from the Abydos King List; possibly an usurper.	7 years (?) (Turin and Manetho)
*		–	Khentkaus II♀	Queen of Egypt, and mother of Neferefre and Nyuserre Ini. She is attested with title that can be translated as "mother of two kings of Upper and Lower Egypt" or "mother of king of Upper Egypt and Lower Egypt, King of Upper and Lower Egypt". The latter interpretation would mean she became pharaoh in her own right.	–
5		Neferefre	Isi	His name is alternatively read as Raneferef. Also constructed an unfinished pyramid. Beckerath records his nomen as Isi, but Hornung uses this name for Shepseskare without explanation. Bunson uses Ini for Shepseskare and Izi for Nyuserre, also without explanation.	1–2 years
6		Nyuserre	Ini	A prolific builder, mainly known for his massive sun temple in Abu Gorab. Also built several pyramids for himself and his family, all in the necropolis of Abusir.	Disputed; 15–30 years
7		Menkauhor	Kaiu	Perhaps the owner of the Headless Pyramid rediscovered in 2008.	9 years
8		Djedkare	Isesi	Built his pyramid in Saqqara. According to radiocarbon dating, his reign began in the range of 2486–2400 or 2503–2449 BC. Other reign dates, based on dead reckoning, include 2414–2375, and 2365–2332 BC (± 25 years).	Disputed; 33–44 years
9		Unas		His pyramid is inscribed with the earliest instance of the Pyramid Texts. The Turin King List records the total of years from Menes to Unas as 768 years. According to radiocarbon dating, his reign began in the range of 2450–2363 BC, or following the death of his predecessor in the range of 2468–2415 BC.	Disputed; 16–30 years

Comparison of royal lists

Pharaoh	Karnak	Abydos	Saqqara	Palermo	Turin		Manetho (Africanus)		
Userkaf	–	Userkaf	Userkaf	8 years	[User]kaf	7	Userkheres	Ουσερχερης	28
Sahure	Sahure	Sahure	Sahure	13 years	Name lost	12	Sephres	Σεφρης	13
Neferirkare Kakai	–	Kakai	Neferirkare		Name lost	Lost	Nepherkheres	Νεφερχερης	20
Shepseskare	–	–	Shepseskare		Name lost	7	Sisires	Σισιρης	7
Neferefre	–	Neferefre	Khaneferre		Name lost	1 (?	Kheres	Χερης	20
Nyuserre Ini	Ini	Nyuserre	–		Name lost	10+	Rhathoures	Ραθουρης	44
Menkauhor Kaiu	–	Menkauhor	Menkauhor		Menkauhor	8	Menkheres	Μενχερης	9
Djedkare Isesi	Isesi	Djedkare	Maatkare		Djedu	28	Tankheres	Τανχερης	44
Unas	–	Unis	Unis		Unis	30	Onnos	Οννος	33
					102 years + […]		Africanus: "248 years", Eusebius: (100) (Note: Eusebius' fifth dynasty kings actually belong to the sixth, and Eusebius simply added 100 years for this dynasty in the total with the previous dynasties. This suggests that the epitomist misread, misunderstood, or accidentally skipped to the subsequent dynasty while copying the text.) (actual sum is 218 years)		
					102 years + […]		Africanus: Dyn. I–V, 1294 years (actual sum is 1281 years)		
							Eusebius: Dyn. I–V, 1295 years (actual sum is 1301 years)		

=== Sixth Dynasty ===
By the Fifth Dynasty, the religious institution had established itself as the dominant force in society; a trend of growth in the bureaucracy and the priesthood, and a decline in the pharaoh's power had been established during Neferirkare Kakai's reign. During Djedkare Isesi's rule, officials were endowed with greater authority—evidenced by the opulent private tombs they constructed—eventually leading to the creation of a feudal system in effect. These established trends—decentralization of authority, coupled with growth in bureaucracy—intensified during the three decades of Unas's rule, which also witnessed economic decline.

Proposed dates: c. 2322–2191 BC (131 years), c. 2323–2150 BC (173 years), c. 2300–2181 BC (150 years), c. 2345–2181 BC (164 years), c. 2305–2118 BC (187 years)

(#) – Existence disputed

#	Image	Personal name	Throne name	Notes	Reign
1		Teti		Married Iput I, a daughter of Unas. He was murdered by his bodyguards according to Manetho. Build a pyramid in Saqqara. According to radiocarbon dating, his reign began in the range of 2423–2335 BC.	c. 22 years (Note: His reign is usually given as c. 12 years, but an "11th count" is recorded under an unknown king. According to Hornung, "all arguments favour the reign of Teti" and thus a biannual count would give at least 22 years. However, some counts were likely irregular.)
2		–	Userkare	Excluded from the Saqqara King List; possibly usurped the throne from Teti and ruled for a brief time.	c. 2 years
3		Pepi I	Meryre	Son of Teti and grandson of Unas, began his reign as a child. Faced conspiracies and political troubles, yet became the most prolific builder of his dynasty. His pyramid complex, named Mn-nfr, led to the Greek word Memphis. Hiku Ptah, one of Memphis' epithets, would become the Greek Aigyptos.	c. 50 years
4		Nemtyemsaf I	Merenre I	Had a short reign, commissioned a pyramid but was not able to finish it.	c. 11 years
5		Pepi II	Neferkare	Possibly the longest-reigning monarch in history. According to Manetho, he began his reign at the age of 6 and lived to the age of 100. The Turin King List gives him a reign of 90+ years, but his last known document is dated to his 63rd year, implying 64 years of rule. Decentralization grew during his long reign as nomarchs grew in power, and his large pyramid complex (the last of its kind) drained Egypt's treasury.	c. 64 years
6		Nemtyemsaf II	Merenre II	Short-lived king, an aged son of Pepi II.	c. 1 year
*	–	Nitocris♀	–	Last ruler according to Manetho, who attributes to her the "Third Pyramid". According to Herodotus, she ruled after her brother's murder. The story is almost certainly fiction, and Manetho's Nitocris appears to be a convoluted conflation of three different kings: Netjerkare Siptah, Menkare, and Menkaure. (Note: The name "Nitocris" possibly derives from the male king Netjerkare Siptah, later misunderstood as feminine. According to Flinders Petrie, Netjerkare was likely conflated with his successor Menkare, who was in turn merged with Menkaure, the well-known builder of the "Third Pyramid", due to the similarity of their names.)	–

Comparison of royal lists

Historical Pharaoh	Karnak	Abydos	Saqqara	Turin King List		Manetho		
Teti	Teti	Teti	Teti	Name lost	[...], 6m, 21d	Othoes	Οθοης	30
Userkare	–	Userkare	–	Name lost	Lost	–	–	–
Pepi I Meryre	Pepi	Meryre	Pepi	Name lost	20 years	Phios	Φιος	53
Merenre Nemtyemsaf I	Merenre	Merenre	Merenre	Name lost	44 years	Methusouphis	Μεθουσουφις	7
Pepi II Neferkare	–	Neferkare	Neferkare	Name lost	90+ years	Phiops	Φιωψ	94
Merenre Nemtyemsaf II	–	Merenre Saemsaf	–	Name lost	1y, 1m	Menthesouphis	Μενφεσουφις	1
					c. 160 years (Note: The Turin King List gives a minimum of 155 years for the Sixth Dynasty, although Pepi II Neferkare's reign is possibly inflated by a few decades. The sum of years for the Sixth to Eighth Dynasties is given as 187 years, which implies c. 27 years for the latter period (the sum of known reigns amounts to a minimum of 15 years).)	Nitokris	Νιτωκρις	12
								203

According to Africanus, the total sum for the kings of the First through Sixth dynasties amounts to 1497 years, but the actual sum of items gives 1478. Eusebius closely follows Africanus and records 1498 total years, but the actual sum of his numbers is 1504. This may imply that the summation figures are more accurate than the individual reigns.

The Turin King List records a total of 52 kings up to Neferirkare, that is, 45 kings from Menes to Merenre Nemtyemsaf II, although the list includes two fictitious kings in the Fourth Dynasty, thus totaling 43 kings. Africanus records a total of 48 kings, while Eusebius records about 70. This discrepancy is the result of a misunderstanding of the text, as later both Eusebius and Africanus record 192 kings before the Twelfth Dynasty.

== First Intermediate period (c. 2200–2050 BC) ==
The Old Kingdom rapidly collapsed after the death of Pepi II Neferkare, who supposedly reigned up to 94 years, longer than any monarch in history. The latter years of his reign were probably marked by inefficiency because of his advanced age. This was further exacerbated by the 4.2-kiloyear event, a climate shift around 2200 BC which caused widespread desertification and famine.

The kings of the 7th and 8th Dynasties, who represented the successors of the 6th Dynasty, tried to hold onto some power in Memphis but owed much of it to powerful nomarchs. After a couple of decades, they were overthrown by a new line of pharaohs based in Heracleopolis Magna. Some time after these events, a rival line based at Thebes revolted against their Northern overlords and united Upper Egypt. The Theban pharaoh Mentuhotep II, the son and successor of Intef III, defeated the Herakleopolitan pharaohs and reunited the Two Lands, thereby starting the Middle Kingdom.

=== Seventh and Eighth Dynasties ===
Africanus records 70 kings in 70 days, and Eusebius record 5 kings in 75 days; both are clearly embellishments. Some historians dismiss the existence of a Seventh Dynasty, while others argue it could correspond to the "lacuna of 6 years" recorded in the Turin King List. The following tables are based on Beckerath 1999, pp. 66–69 & 284, which is itself based on the Abydos King List. The Turin King List only records Netjerkare Siptah and the last 6 names. This line ruled from Memphis, and it is thought that it lasted only about one generation, or about 30 years. Manetho reports 27 kings for the Eighth Dynasty; the number may be a corruption of "17 kings", the total of kings for this line.

#	Image	Personal name	Throne name	Notes
1		Siptah	Netjerkare	Attested in contemporary records. Sometimes listed in Dynasty VII, if identified with Manetho's Nitocris.
2		Menkare	–	Attested in contemporary records.
3		Neferkare II	–	Attested in contemporary records.
4		Neby	Neferkare III Neby	Attested in contemporary records.
5		Shemai	Djedkare II Shemai	–
6		Khendu	Neferkare IV Khendu	–
7		Merenhor	–	–
8		Neferkamin I	–	Attested in contemporary records.
9		Nikare	–	Attested in contemporary records.
10		Tereru	Neferkare V Tereru	–
11		Neferkahor	–	Attested in contemporary records.
12		Pepiseneb	Neferkare VI Pepiseneb	Reigned for at least one year according to Kim Ryholt. The Turin King List calls him Neferka.
13		Anu	Neferkamin II Anu	–
14		Ibi	Qakare	Attested by his pyramid at Saqqara. May have ruled 2 years. (Note: The Turin King List gives both Qakare Ibi and Neferkauhor a reign of 2 years, 1 month, and 1 day.)
15		–	Neferkaure	Attested in the Coptos Decrees. (Note: Bunson credits the Pyramid of Neferkare Neby to Neferkaure instead, and lists him as the founder of the Eight Dynasty, as well as the predecessor of Qakare.) Reigned 4 years and 2 months.
16		Khuwihapi	Neferkauhor	Attested by Coptos Decrees. May have ruled 2 years.
17		Pepi III	Neferirkare II	Nomen was found in 2014. Ruled 1 year and half a month.
The position of the following pharaohs is unknown:
*	–	–	Sekhemkare I	Alternatively Anchkare.
*	–	–	Wadjkare	Attested in the Coptos Decrees
*	–	–	Ity	Possibly a 9th Dynasty king. Built a pyramid.
*		–	Imhotep	His name was found in Wadi Hammamat.
*	–	Hotep	–	–
*		–	Khui	Only attested in one inscription near Manfalut
*	–	Isu	–	–
*	–	Iytjenu	–	Only indirectly attested in Saqqara

The Turin King List records the years from Teti until Neferirkare II as 181 years, 6 months, 3 days, with a lacuna of 6 years, totaling 187 years. The total from Menes is given as 52 kings amounting to 955 years and 15 days, but the number of years is certainly inflated. Diodorus Siculus (c. 50 BC), most likely based on a similar tradition, writes that Menes was succeeded by 52 kings that ruled for 1040 years.^{:45} For the sum of the first eight dynasties, Manetho and Eusebius record 1639 and 1598 years, respectively, but these figures do not match the previous sums.

=== Ninth and Tenth Dynasties ===
Africanus records 19 kings for 409 years, but only lists one Achthoes, a tyrant who was killed by a crocodile. Meanwhile, Eusebius records 4 kings in 100 years. For the next dynasty, they both record 19 kings for 185 years, but list none. It is possible that the 9th and 10th dynasties were in fact a single dynasty that was duplicated by Manetho (or one of his scribes), resulting in two Heracleopolean dynasties of 19 kings. The Turin King List records an unbroken line of 18 kings, but almost all names, as well as the sum of regnal years, are damaged. A break between dynasties, while still possible, can't be pinpointed with any certainty.

#	Image	Personal name	Throne name	Notes
1		Khety I (Note: This is the numbering adopted by Bunson. Leprohon, using an older reconstruction, records seven kings named "Khety". He refers to Wahkare as "Khety V", Nebkaure as "Khety VII", and Merybre as "Khety VIII".)	Meryibre	Name lost in the Turin list; believed by some scholars to be the first king of the dynasty.
2	Name lost			
3	–	–	Neferkare VII	–
4		Khety II	Nebkaure	Attested in the tale The Eloquent Peasant.
5	–	–	Setut[...]	Alternatively Senen.
6	–	–	Neferkare[...]	Name lost in the Turin list.
7	–	–	Mery[...] Khety[...]	–
8	–	–	Shed[...]	–
9	–	–	H[...]	–
10	5 names lost			
?		–	Meryhathor (?)	Name lost in the Turin list; name found in a damaged graffiti at Hatnub. Hayes claims that the Turin King List records 5 kings for the Tenth Dynasty and places him as the founder. However, there is no such division in the document and thus his position, as well as that of the supposed break between dynasties, is uncertain. The exact reading of his name is disputed.
16	–	–	Neferkare VIII	Name lost in the Turin list; possibly mentioned in the tomb of nomarch Ankhtifi
17		Khety III	Wahkare	Name lost in the Turin list; possible author of the Teaching for King Merykara
18		–	Merikare	Name lost in the Turin list; main rival of the Theban pharaoh Mentuhotep II. Hayes claims that the Turin King List records an additional ruler after him, but this is certainly not the case.

=== Eleventh Dynasty (Thebes) ===
According to Hornung, the Theban monarchy began no more than 40 years after the fall of the Old Kingdom.

(#) – Nomarch of Thebes

#	Image	Personal name	Horus name	Notes	Reign (Note: The Turin King List is considered more reliable from the Eleventh Dynasty onwards, as most of its figures match archeological records. The years given correspond to full years.)
*		Intef "the Elder"	–	Theban nomarch and ancestor of the rest of the dynasty, was later considered a founding figure of the Eleventh Dynasty and was included in the Karnak King List, though his name is not written in a cartouche, indicating that he was not retroactively considered pharaoh like Mentuhotep I.	–
(1)		Mentuhotep I	Tepia	Listed as the first king in the Turin King List, probably did not bear the title of pharaoh but instead was a Theban nomarch that was later retroactively considered as the first king of the dynasty.	16 (full) years c. 2125 BC, ± 15 year.
2		Intef I	Sehertawy	Expanded Theban control over several other nomes of Upper Egypt. Was buried in El-Tarif.	16 (full) years c. 2125 BC, ± 15 year.
3		Intef II	Wahankh	Brother of Intef I, and buried with him in El-Tarif. Fought the forces of Heracleopolis at Thinis, the old capital, which was ravaged. Also faced a famine in Upper Egypt.	49 years
4		Intef III	Nakhtnebtepnefer	An aged son of Intef II, also buried in El-Tarif. Expanded Theban control to Asyut. His son would finish the unification of all Egypt.	8 years

Manetho writes:

The Eleventh Dynasty consisted of sixteen kings of Diospolis, who reigned for 43 years. In succession to these, Ammenemes ruled for 16 years.
Here ends the First Book of Manetho. Total for the reigns of 192 kings, 2300 years 70 days. (Note: "Sixteen kings for 43 years" is clearly a corruption of "six kings for 143 years", as stated in the Turin King List. The king list also includes a lacuna of 7 years that corresponds to the reign of Mentuhotep IV, whose name was lost. Africanus and Eusebius both record the same number of kings and years (Eusebius writes 79 days). The actual sum of Africanus' kings is 200, and that of his years is 2292. This is over twice the number of kings and years calculated by Egyptologists. Amenemhat I, the founder of the Twelfth Dynasty, was moved to this place for unknown reasons, most likely a misunderstanding of the original text.)

== Middle Kingdom (c. 2050–1800 BC) ==
The kings of the 11th Dynasty ruled from Thebes and the kings of the 12th Dynasty ruled from Itjtawy, near Lisht. The periodization of the Middle Kingdom is somewhat disputed; some authors include only the Eleventh and Twelfth Dynasties, while others include the Eleventh, Thirteenth and Fourteenth Dynasties.

Egyptian chronology becomes more reliable from this point onward, although dates still differ depending on the author. The reign of Senusret III can securely be dated to the middle of the 19th century BC (c. 1850, ± 25 years), thus dating the beginning of the 12th dynasty to the mid 20th century BC (c. 1950), and the 11th dynasty to the mid 21st century BC (c. 2050 BC). This is supported by radiocarbon dating, which shows that the Middle Kingdom likely began in the range of 2057–2040 BC, with more certainty between 2064 and 2019 BC. The accession of Senusret III is dated to 1884–1860 BC, with more certainty between 1889 and 1836 BC.

=== Eleventh Dynasty cont. ===
The Turin King List records the duration of the whole dynasty as 143 years, starting with Mentuhotep I, and 70 years starting with Mentuhotep II.

Proposed dates: c. 2046–1995 (51 years), c. 2061–1991 BC (70 years), c. 2046–1976 BC (70 years), c. 2055–1985 BC (70 years), c. 2009–1940 BC (69 years)

(#) – Status ambiguous

#	Image	Personal name	Throne name	Notes	Reign
5		Mentuhotep II	Nebhepetre	Sometimes called Mentuhotep I. Son of Intef III, fought for the reunification of Egypt during his first three decades as king, completed it in his 39th year on the throne, beginning the Middle Kingdom. Centralized the government in Thebes and revived great royal projects, such as his massive mortuary temple.	51 years c. 2050 BC, ± 15 year
6		Mentuhotep III	Sankhkare	Carried out several building works and sent expeditions to the Land of Punt.	12 years
7		Mentuhotep IV	Nebtawyre	Was overthrown in a coup by his vizier, who may have erased his name from official records, as he is omitted in most king lists.	7 years
*		Ini / Intef	Qakare	Three enigmatic names recorded only in Lower Nubia; possibly correspond to usurpers or pretenders at the end of the Eleventh Dynasty.	–
*		known by his Horus name Geregtawef	Iyibkhentre	Three enigmatic names recorded only in Lower Nubia; possibly correspond to usurpers or pretenders at the end of the Eleventh Dynasty.	–
*		Segerseni	Menkhkare	Three enigmatic names recorded only in Lower Nubia; possibly correspond to usurpers or pretenders at the end of the Eleventh Dynasty.	–

=== Twelfth Dynasty ===
Starting from the Twelfth Dynasty, pharaohs often appointed their heirs as co-rulers before their own death. This is one of the main obstacles when reconstructing the chronology of ancient Egypt. According to radiocarbon dating, the dynasty certainly began between the years 2000 and 1950 BC, perhaps around 1980 BC. The Turin King List gives the sum of years as 213, but does not take co-regencies into account.

Proposed dates: c. 1976–1794/3 BC (182/3 years), c. 1991–1783 (208 years), c. 1985–1773 (212 years), c. 1939–1760 BC (179 years)

#	Image	Personal name	Throne name	Notes	Reign
1		Amenemhat I	Sehetepibre	Vizier of Mentuhotep IV. Moved the capital from Thebes to Itjtawy and was buried in a pyramid at Lisht. Also formally introduced the concept of co-regencies in the monarchy. Like his predecessor, his reign ended at the hands of court officials, who assassinated him before he could celebrate his first Sed festival.	29 years
2		Senusret I	Kheperkare	Co-ruled 10 regnal years with his father, learned of his murder while campaigning in Libya and returned to the capital to avenge him, continuing to rule over a prosperous Egypt.	45 years
3		Amenemhat II	Nubkaure	Faced the opposition of powerful nomarchs who attempted to regain power. Probably co-ruled 2–3 years with his father. However, this has been refuted by some scholars.	35 years
4		Senusret II	Khakheperre	Co-ruled for 3 years with his father. Revitalized cultivation in Faiyum and gained the support of local elites. Also expanded Egyptian influence in the region, particularly over Syria and Nubia.	7–8 years
5		Senusret III	Khakaure	His accession has been traditionally dated to 1878 BC, but this is rejected by modern scholars. (Note: 1878 was the date calculated by Parker in 1977, but it has been shown that his "sequencing of the Illahun lunar dates was wrong". Various dates have been proposed over the years, all around 1850 BC: Hornung argues for 1837/6, while two independent studies argue for 1847 or 1886.) Radiocarbon dating provides the range 1889–1836 BC. One of the most famed and powerful pharaohs, a great warrior and administrator. Tales of his Nubian conquest were likely one of the origins of the legendary Sesostris recorded by Herodotus. (Note: The tale of Sesostris, who supposedly campaigned as far as Europe, was likely an Egyptian narrative to present an ideal ruler. According to Herodotus, Sesostris created a massive empire that stretched into Europe. Needless to say, pretty much all of Sesostris' deeds are believed to be unhistorical. He is thought to be a conflation of Egypt's greatest rulers (the Senusrets, Thutmose III and Ramesses II). Manetho identifies this "Sesostris" with Senusret III, the third king of his Twelfth Dynasty (omitting Amenemhat I and Senusret II).)	38 years c. 1850 BC, ± 25 years
6		Amenemhat III	Nimaatre	Co-ruled 20 years with his father. Also considered a great ruler, ruling at the zenith of the Middle Kingdom.	45 years
7		Amenemhat IV	Maakherure	Co-ruled for around 1 year with his father. Continued the family's project at Faiyum, but did not leave many written records.	9 years 3 months, 27 days
8		Sobekneferu♀	Sobekkare	First confirmed female pharaoh. To strengthen her position she retroactively claimed to be her father's chosen heir and co-regent, while in reality she ascended the throne only after the death of her brother-husband, in the absence of male heirs. Perhaps the owner of the Northern Mazghuna pyramid, although she did not use it.	3 years 10 months, 24 days

Manethonian royal lists

	Pharaoh	Manetho				Highest Year	Years reigned		
	Pharaoh	Africanus & Eusebius				Highest Year	Turin	Afric.	Eus.
1	Amenemhat I Sehetepibre	(Ammenemes)	Aμμενεμης (not included)			30th	29	(16)	(16)
2	Senusret I Kheperkare	Sesonkhosis	Σεσονχοσις			45th	45	46	46
3	Amenemhat II Nubkaure	Ammanemes	Aμμανεμης			35th	30+	38	38
4	Senusret II Khakheperre	Sesostris	Σεσωστρις			8/9th	19	48	48
5	Senusret III Khakaure	Lakhares	Λαχαρης	Lamaris	Λαμαρις	39th	30+	8	8
6	Amenemhat III Nimaatre	Ammeres	Aμμερης			46th	40+	8	42
7	Amenemhat IV Maakherure	Ammenemes	Aμμενεμης			10th	9	8	42
8	Sobekneferu Sobekkare	Skemiophris	Σκεμιoφρις			3rd	3	4	42
		Turin total: 213 years, 1 month, 17 days							
Turin total minus co-regencies: c. 181 years
Africanus total: 160 years (176 years plus Amenemhat)
Eusebius total: 245 years (actual sum is 182 years, 198 plus Amenemhat)

== Second Intermediate period (c. 1800–1550 BC) ==
Reconstructing the chronology of the Second Intermediate period is even more difficult than the First, as there are very few and contradictory records. The Turin King List is the only one to include rulers of this period, but it is badly damaged after the Twelfth Dynasty. This period is best known for the rule of the Fifteenth Dynasty established by the Hyksos people of West Asia. It was a time of political rather than social upheavals.

At some point during the weak Thirteenth Dynasty, the provincial ruling family in Xois, located in the Nile Delta, broke away to form Fourteenth Dynasty. Around the same time, the Asiatic people known as the Hyksos established themselves around the Delta, and soon after took control of Avaris (modern Tell el-Dab'a), beginning Fifteenth Dynasty. The Hyksos took over most of Lower Egypt and ended the Thirteenth and Fourteenth Dynasties. They were also known as the "Great Hyksos" because of their dominance. The power vacuum in Upper Egypt enabled the Sixteenth Dynasty to declare independence in Thebes, only to be overrun by the Hyksos shortly thereafter. Subsequently, as the Hyksos withdrew from Upper Egypt, a new native Egyptian house in Thebes set itself up as Seventeenth. This dynasty eventually drove the Hyksos back into Asia, starting the New Kingdom.

=== Thirteenth Dynasty ===
As opposed to the previous dynasty, there are little to no historical records regarding this dynasty, with only a few kings leaving archeological records. The dynasty possibly originates from Canaan, as some rulers (Sekhemkare, Hotepibre) are called "Asiatics". Merneferre Ay, while not the final pharaoh, was the last king attested in Lower and Upper Egypt, later pharaohs are only attested in the south. The earlier part of the dynasty until Ay is sometimes considered part of the Middle kingdom, but more often the whole dynasty is considered part of the Second Intermediate period.

Manetho records "60 kings of Diospolis for 453 years". Notably, the number of kings appears to be somewhat correct, as the Turin King List records a minimum of 51 kings, which Ryholt rises to 57. However, only the first half of the names survives, and the reign lengths are also damaged. Manetho's total of 453 years is sometimes emended as 153, but there is no definitive proof of this. According to radiocarbon dating, the Thirteenth Dynasty began between the years 1800 and 1740 BC. According to Hornung, Ay's reign ended around 1650 BC, at least 100 years after the beginning of the dynasty.

The succession is based on the reconstruction of Kim Ryholt. Almost all kings reigned for a very short time, for about 1 to 3 years each. Ryholt also suggests that the division by Manetho is based not on a familiar break, but because of the rise of the Dynasty XIV. The exact succession of rulers is highly disputed.

Proposed dates: c. 1794/3–1648/5 (146/8 years), c. 1793/73–after 1650/40+ (120+ years), c. 1760–1630 BC (130 years), c. 1803–1649 BC (154 years)

(#) – Existence disputed

#	Image	Personal name	Throne name	Notes	Reign
1		Amenemhat; Sobekhotep I	Sekhemre Khutawy	Listed as the 11th ruler in the Turin King List. However, its author may have confused his throne name (Khutawy) with that of Wegaf (Khutawyra) Some sources thus refer to Sekhemre Khutawy Sobekhotep as "Sobekhotep II", and Khaankhre Sobekhotep as "Sobekhotep I".	2 years 3 months, 24 days
2		Amenemhat; Senebef	Sekhemkare	Ryholt suggests that the first two kings were in fact sons of Amenemhat IV, who he treats as an adoptive son of Amenemhat III. This would explain their double name, which Ryholt treats as filiative nomina.	c. 4–5 years
3		–	Nerikare	Not recorded in the Turin King List, attested by one document dated to his Year 1.	–
4		Amenemhat V	Sekhemkare	Ryholt postulates that he was of non-royal birth. The Hyksos were already established in the Nile Delta by his reign. Bunson treats him as the same person as Ameny Qemau for unknown reasons.	3 years
5		Ameny; Qemau	–	Perhaps the son of Amenemhat V ("Ameny"). Built a Pyramid in southern Dahshur.	–
6		Qemau; Siharnedjheritef	Hotepibre	Perhaps the son of Qemau.	–
7	–	Iufni	–	Origin unknown.	–
8		Ameny Antef; Amenemhat VI	Seankhibre	His full name perhaps means "son of Antef, son of Ameny (Amenemhat)". Most likely the same king as Seankhibtawy Seankhibre.	–
9		Nebnuni	Semenkare	Possibly of non-royal birth.	–
10		–	Sehetepibre	Known for a few cylinder seals.	a few months
11	–	–	Sewadjkare I	Known only from the Turin King List	–
12	–	–	Nedjemibre	Known only from the Turin King List	7 months
13		Sobekhotep II	Khaankhre	Cylinder seals and scarabs bearing his royal name have been discovered.	–
14	–	–	Renseneb	Probably a son of Amenemhat VI.	4 months
15		Hor	Awibre	Not recorded in the Turin King List, but attested on contemporary records. Was buried in the Pyramid Complex of Amenemhat III, Dahshur. Known for his intact Ka statue.	–
16		known by his Horus name Khabaw	Sekhemrekhutawy	Not recorded in the Turin King List, possibly a son and co-ruler of Hor.	–
17		known by his Horus name Djedkheperew	–	Not recorded in the Turin King List, possibly a son of Hor. Known for building the "Osiris Bed", a sarcophagus set up for Osiris in the tomb of Djer. Later pharaohs erased his name.	–
18		Seb	–	Proposed by Ryholt as successors of Djedkheperew; possibly did not exist. "Sebkay" may be a diminutive for throne name of Sedjefakare Kay Amenemhat VII, but may also be the same king as Senebkay.	–
19		Kay	–	Proposed by Ryholt as successors of Djedkheperew; possibly did not exist. "Sebkay" may be a diminutive for throne name of Sedjefakare Kay Amenemhat VII, but may also be the same king as Senebkay.	–
20		Kay; Amenemhat VII	Sedjefakare	His name has been found in Tanis, Elephantine and Medamud.	–
21		Wegaf	Khutawyre	Sometimes listed as the founder of the dynasty.	–
22		Khendjer	Userkare	Possibly of non-royal birth. Had a small pyramid built for himself in Saqqara. Three other unidentified small pyramids have been found near Khendjer's.	–
23		Imyremeshaw	Smenkhkare	–	–
24		Intef IV	Sehetepkare	–	–
25		Seth	Meribre	–	–
26		Sobekhotep III	Sekhemre Sewadjtawy	Son of one Mentuhotep. Build a temple at Medamud and have statues erected in Nubia.	4 years 2 months [...]
27		Neferhotep I	Khasekhemre	Son of one Haankhef and a royal woman; he was succeeded by his brothers Sihathor, and Sobekhotep IV.	11 years 1 month [...]
28		Sihathor	Menwadjre	Brother and possible co-ruler of Neferhotep.	a few months
29		Sobekhotep IV	Khaneferre	Brother of Sihathor. Faced rebellions and campaigned in Nubia. Bunson believes the Hyksos conquered Avaris during his reign. (Note: Bunson omits Merhotepre Sobekhotep in the count of Sobekhoteps, hence applying the name "Sobekhotep V" to Khahotepre Sobkehotep.)	–
30		Sobekhotep V	Merhotepre	Parentage disputed; son of a woman named Nubhotepti.	–
31		Sobekhotep VI	Khahotepre	Son of Merhotepre Sobekhotep; left a stela Karnak.	4 years 8 months, 29 days
32		Ibiau	Wahibre	His name is attested in stelas and seals.	10 years 8 months, 28 days
33		Ay I	Merneferre	Attested in several monuments in the Nile Valley. Bunson believes he was a native of Avaris and a vassal of the Hyksos. Last pharaoh attested in Lower and Upper Egypt, probably due to a rebellion.	23 years 8 months, 18 days
34		Ini I	Merhotepre	Possibly a son of King Ay. Only attested in Upper Egypt.	2 years 2–4 months, 9 days
35	–	Sewadjtu	Sankhenre	Attested only on the Turin King List	3 years 2–4 months
36	–	Ined	Mersekhemre	Thought by some to be the same king as Neferhotep II.	3 years 1 month, 1 day
37	–	Hori	Sewadjkare II	Attested only on the Turin King List	5 years [...] months, 1 day
38		Sobekhotep VII	Merkawre	–	2 years [...] months, 4 days
46	–8 names lost in the Turin King List–				
47		–	Merkheperre	–	–
48	–	–	Merkare	Last name preserved in the Turin King List	–
57	–9 names lost in the Turin King List–				
The position of the following pharaohs is unknown:
*		Neferhotep II	Mersekhemre	Thought by some to be the same king as Ined.	–
*		Ini II	Mershepsesre	Full name attested in a single inscription from Karnak.	–
*		Senebmiu	Sewahenre	Full name attested in a tomb in Kurna, his prenomen is also listed in the Karnak King List.	–
*		Mentuhotep V	Sewadjare	Full name attested in a single inscription. Beckearth calls him Mentuhotep VI.	–
*		Sankhptahi	Seheqenre	Attested in a Memphite stela.	–
*		Dedumose I	Djedhotepre	Attested in a stela from Edfu.	–
*		Dedumose II	Djedneferre	Possibly a vassal of the Hyksos.	–
*		Montemsaf	Djedankhre	Attested by an inscribed block found in Gebelein.	–
*		Mentuhotep VI	Merankhre	Likely ruled in the 16th dynasty.	–
*		Senusret IV	Seneferibre	Perhaps ruled in the 17th dynasty.	–
*		–	Nebmaatre	Perhaps ruled in the 17th dynasty.	–
*		Pepi IV	Seneferankhre	Existence disputed; may have ruled in the 16th dynasty. but more likely during the First Intermediate period.	–
*		Sobekhotep IX	Maare	Only known from scarab seals.	–

Complete royal list of Dynasty XIII

#	Pharaoh (Ryholt)	Karnak King List	Turin King List		Pharaoh (Beckerath)	#
1	Sekhemre Khutawy Amenemhat Sobekhotep I	Sekhemre Khutawy	Khutawyra	2 years, 3 months, 24 days	Wegaf	1
2	Sekhemkare Amenemhat Senebef		Sekhemkare Am[...] (?) [...] [...] years [...] lacuna years, 6 years		Senebef	2
3	Nerikare		Sekhemkare Am[...] (?) [...] [...] years [...] lacuna years, 6 years		Pantjeny	3
4	Sekhemkare Amenemhat V		Amenemhat(ra) [...]	3–4 years (+ lacuna ?)	Amenemhat V	4
5	Ameny Qemau		Amenemhat(ra) [...]	3–4 years (+ lacuna ?)	Amenemhat V	4
6	Hotepibre		Sehotepibre	1 [year ?]	Se-Hotepibre	5
7	Iufni		Iufni	Lost	Iufni	6
8	Seankhibre Amenemhat VI	Sankhibre	Sankhibre	[...] and 23 [days]	Amenemhat VI	7
9	Semenkare Nebnuni		Semenkare	[...] and 22 [days]	Nebnuni	8
10	Sehetepibre		Sehotepibre	1+ months and 27 days	Sehetepibre	9
11	Sewadjkare		Sewadjkare	[...] and 21+ days	Sewadjkare	10
12	Nedjemibre		Nedjemibre	0 years, 7 months	Nedjemibre	11
13	Khaankhre Sobekhotep II	Khaankhra	Sobek[hot]ep	Lost	Sobekhotep I	12
14	Renseneb		Ren[se]neb	0 years, 4 months	Renseneb	13
15	Awibre Hor		Awtibre	[...] and 7 days (+ lacuna ?)	Hor I	14
16	Horus-Khabaw		Awtibre	[...] and 7 days (+ lacuna ?)	Hor I	14
17	Horus-Djedkheperew		Awtibre	[...] and 7 days (+ lacuna ?)	Hor I	14
18	Seb (may not exist)		Awtibre	[...] and 7 days (+ lacuna ?)	Hor I	14
19	Kay (may not exist)		Awtibre	[...] and 7 days (+ lacuna ?)	Hor I	14
20	Sedjefakare Kay Amenemhat VII		Sedjefa[...]kare	Lost	Amenemhat VII	15
21	Khutawyre Wegaf	Khutawire	Sekhemre Khutawy Sobekhotep	Lost	Amenemhat Sobekhotep II	16
22	Userkare Khendjer		User[ka]re Khendjer	Lost	Khendjer	17
23	Smenkhkare Imyremeshaw		[...]kare Imyremeshaw	[...] and 4 days	Smenkhkare	18
24	Sehetepkare Intef IV	Intef	[Sehotep]ka[ra] Intef	[...] and 3 days	Intef IV	19
25	Seth Meribre		[Mer]ib[ra] Seth	[...] and 6 days	Seth	20
26	Sekhemre Sobekhotep III		Sekhemkare Sobekhotep	4 years, 2 months, [...] days	Sobekhotep III	21
27	Khasekhemre Neferhotep I	Khasekhemre	Khasekhemre Neferhotep	11 years, 1 month, [...] days	Neferhotep I	22
28	Menwadjre Sihathor		Sihathor	1+ months and 3 days	Sihathor	23
29	Khaneferre Sobekhotep IV	Khaneferre	Khaneferre Sobekhotep	Lost	Sobekhotep IV	24
30	Merhotepre Sobekhotep V	Merhotepre	Name lost	Lost	–	*
31	Khahotepre Sobekhotep VI	Khahotepre	Khahotepra	4 years, 8 months, 29 days	Sobekhotep V	25
32	Wahibre Ibiau		Wahibre Jaib	10 years, 8 months, 28 days	Ibiau	26
33	Merneferre Ay I		Merneferre	23 years, 8 months, 10 days	Ay I	27
34	Merhotepre Ini		Merhotepra	2 years, 2–4 months, 9 days	Sobekhotep VI / Ini ?	28
35	Sankhenre Sewadjtu		Sankhenre Sewadjtu	3 years and 2–4 months	Sewadjtu	29
36	Mersekhemre Ined	Mersekhemre	Mersekhemre Ined	3 years, 1 month, 1 [day]	Ined / Neferhotep II ?	30
37	Sewadjkare Hori		Sewadjkare Hori	5 years, [...] and 8 days	Hori	31
38	Merkawre Sobekhotep VII	Merkaure	Merkau[re] Sobek[hotep]	2 years, [...] and 4 days	Sobekhotep VII	32
39	–		Name lost	[...] and 11 days	Lost	33
40	–		Name lost	Lost	Lost	34
41	–		Name lost	Lost	Lost	35
42	Mersekhemre Neferhotep II (position uncertain)		Name lost	Lost	Lost	36
43	Mershepsesre Ini II (position uncertain)		Name lost	Lost		
44	Sewahenre Senebmiu (position uncertain)	Sewahenre	Name lost	Lost	Lost	42
45	–		Name lost	Lost	Lost	43
46	–		Mer [...]re[...]	Lost	Lost	45
47	Merkheperre		Mer-kheper-Ra	Lost	Merkheperre	46
48	Merkare		Merka[ra]	Lost	Merkare	47
49	–		Name lost	Lost		
50	Sewadjare Mentuhotep V	Sewadjare	[...]dj[...]	Lost		
51	–		[...]mes[...]	Lost	Dedumose	37
52	Ibi		[...]maatre Ibi [...]	Lost	Ibi II	38
53	Hor[...]		[...]webenre Hor [...]	Lost	Hor II	39
54	–		Se[...]kare [...]	Lost	Se[...]kare	40
55	Seheqenre Sankhptahi		[...]qaenre [...]	Lost	Senebmiu	41
56	–		[...]re [...]	Lost		
57	–		[...]enre [...]	Lost	Secha'enre'	44
			"[…] (total of 51) kings "[...]			

=== Fourteenth Dynasty (Xois) ===
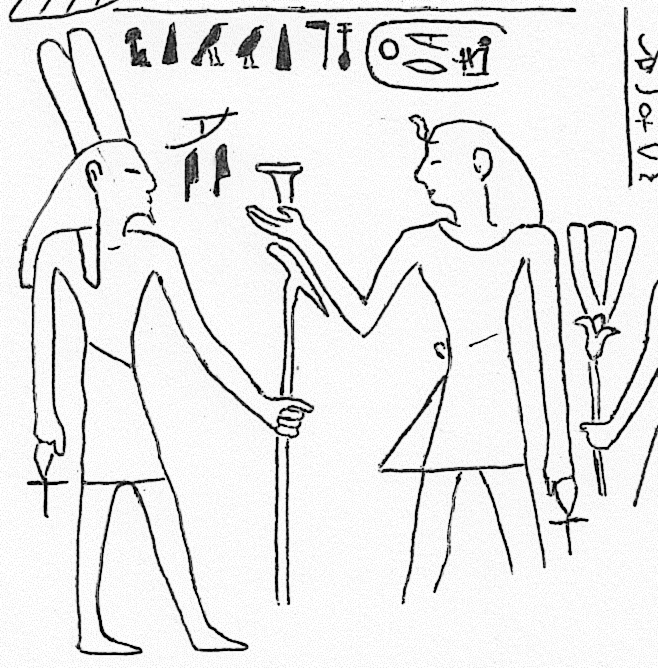
Drawing of an ancient Egyptian stele depicting Merdjefare, the only king of the 14th dynasty to leave a surviving portrait.

Manetho records "76 kings of Xois for 184 years". Ryholt argues that these kings ruled from Avaris, but there is no strong evidence for this. Almost nothing is known about the dynasty, and all its rulers appear to have had very short reigns. The following is the royal succession according to the Turin King List. The document records a minimum of 51 kings (Ryholt raises the number to 56), many of whom ruled alongside Dynasties XIII and XV. They were also of Near Eastern origin.

Only four rulers are contemporarily attested: Nehesy, Nebsenre, Merdjefare, and Sekheperenre. Beckerath, who mostly agrees with Ryholt, records 16 additional names of disputed identity. This dynasty notably includes some of the shortest recorded reigns; the shortest being that of Sekheperenre (61–65 days), which is also the shortest reign of a native pharaoh.

Proposed dates: unknown–c. 1645, c. 1773–1650 (123 years), c. 1805–1649 (156 years)

#	Image	Personal name	Throne name	Reign
1	lost (lacuna?) (Note: The line is missing, but Ryholt theorizes that it contained a lacuna of five kings: Yakbim, Ya'ammu, Qareh, 'Ammu and Sheshi.)			
2		Nehesy	Aasehre	0 years, x months and 3 days.
3	–	–	Khakherewre	3 [...]
4	–	–	Nebefawre	1 year, 5 months, 15 days
5	–	–	Sehebre	3 years, x months, 1 day
6		–	Merdjefare	3–4 years [...]
7	–	–	Sewadjkare III	1 year [...]
8	–	–	Nebdjefare	1 year [...]
9	–	–	Webenre	0 years, x months [...]
10	Name lost			1 year [...]
11	–	–	[...]djefare	0 years, 4 months[...]
12	–	–	[...]benre	0 years, 3 months[...]
13	–	–	[...]Awibre	[...] [...] [...] [...] and 18 days
14	–	–	Heribre	[...] [...] [...] [...] and 29 days
15		–	Nebsenre	0 years, 5 months, 20 days
15	+ lacuna (for an unknown number of kings)			
16	Name lost			[...] [...] [...] [...] and 21 days
17		–	Sekheperenre	0 years, 2 months, 1–5 days
18	–	–	Djedkherewre	0 years, 2 months, 5 days
19	–	–	Seankhibre	[...] [...] [...] [...] and 19 days
20	–	–	Nefertem[...]re	[...] [...] [...] [...] and 18 days
21	–	–	Sekhem[...]re	[...] [...] [...] months (?)
22	–	–	Kakaukemure	(1) year (?)
23	–	–	Neferib[...]re	x years
24	–	–	I[...]re	x years
25	–	–	Khakare	lost
26	–	–	Aakare	lost
27	–	Hapu[...]	Semenenre	lost
28	–	Nebnati	Djedkare	lost
29	–	Bebnum	[...]ka[...]	lost
37	8 names lost			
38	–	–	Senefer[...]re	lost
39	–	–	Men[...]re	lost
40	–	–	[...]Djed[...]	lost
43	3 names lost			
44	–	–	Inenek[...]	lost
45	–	–	Ineb[...]	lost
46		–	'Ip[...] ('Apepi?)	lost
51	5 names lost			
The inclusion and position of the following rulers is disputed: (Note: Ryholt adds 13 rulers of uncertain position and chronology; some may be vassals under the 15th Dynasty and not actual kings, while others may be kings lost in the two lacunae of the Turin King List. They are mostly attested only by their scarab seals. By far the most attested king is Sheshi, who is attested in hundreds of seals.)
*		Yakbim	Sekhaenre	lost
*		Ya'ammu	Nubwoserre	lost
*		Shenshek	–	lost
*		Wazad	–	lost
*		Qareh	Khawoserre	lost
*		Khamure	–	lost
*		'Ammu	Aahotepre	lost
*		Yakareb	–	lost
*		Sheshi	Maaibre	lost
*		Yaqub-Har	Meruserre	lost
*		Nuya	–	lost
*		Sheneh	–	lost

=== Fifteenth Dynasty (Hyksos) ===
The "Hyksos", literally meaning "rulers of foreign lands", were people who emerged from the Fertile Crescent and conquered much of Lower Egypt, as well as parts of Middle Egypt. They were excluded from contemporary Egyptian sources because they were perceived as foreign usurpers. The Turin King List records 6 rulers of foreign lands ruling for roughly 150 years, (Note: Thomas Schneider claims that the total is 108 years, but the editor notes that another reading could give 140 instead. The number could be as high as 189.) but the list is very damaged and much of the information is now lost. Manetho, as quoted by Josephus, reported six "shepherd kings from Phoenicia" ruling for 254 years (the term "shepherd kings" appears to be the result of pronunciation changes). The following is the tentative reconstruction of Kim Ryholt, based on attested names bearing the title of "Hyksos". (Note: Another obscure ruler, Anat-her, is also attested with the title of Hyksos in his seals, but he lacks the complete royal titulary, mainly the nomen and prenomen. Beckerath places him in the 16th dynasty, but Ryholt argues that the lack of cartouche names suggests that he was only a chiefman of foreign origin.)

Proposed dates: c. 1648/5–1539/6 BC (109 years), c. 1650–1550 BC (100 years), c. 1640–1532 (108 years), unknown–c. 1530 BC, c. 1649–1540 (109 years),

#	Image	Egyptian name	Greek name	Notes
1		Semqen (?)	Salitis; Σάλιτις	Position and identity uncertain.
2		Aperanat (?)	Beon; Βηων	Position and identity uncertain.
3	–	Sakir-Har (?)	Apachnas; Aπαχνας	Position and identity uncertain.
4		Khyan (?)	Iannas; Iαννας	Ruled 10+ years according to the Turin King List. The name of his son, Yanassi, may have been confused with his own by Manetho.
5		Apepi	Apophis; Aπωφις	Ruled 40+ years according to the Turin King List.
6		Khamudi	Assis; Aσσις	Only name in the Turin King List; defeated by Ahmose I.

Reconstructions of Dynasty XV

#	Turin King List	Manetho	Ryholt (1997)	Beckerath (1999)	Clayton (2001)	Bunson (2002)	Shaw (2003)	Hornung (2006)
1	Lost	Salitis — 13 years	Semqen	Salitis	Sheshi	Salitis	Salitis/Sekerher	Šarā-Dagan
2	Lost	Beon — 44 years	Aperanat	Beon	Yaqub-Har	Sheshi	–	*Bin-'Anu
3	Lost	Apachnas — 36y, 7m	Sakir-Har	Apakhnas	Khyan	Yaqub-Har	–	('Apaq-) Ḫajran
4	Lost — 10+ years	Apophis — 61y, 2m	Khyan	Khyan	Apepi I	Khyan	Khyan	Jinaśśi'-Ad
*	–	–	–	–	–	–		Sikru-Haddu
5	Lost — 40+ years	Iannas — 50y, 1m	Apepi	Apepi	Apepi (II)	Apepi	Apepi	Apapi
6	Khamudi [...]	Assis — 49 years	Khamudi	Khamudi	–	Khamudi	Khamudi	Ḫālmu'di

Manetho's Dynasties XV to XVII

	Manetho's original	Josephus	Africanus	Eusebius
Dynasty XV	6 shepherd kings	6 shepherd kings, 254 years	6 shepherd kings, 284 years	Kings of Thebes, 250 years
Dynasty XVI	32 shepherd kings	–	32 shepherd kings, 518 years	5 kings of Thebes, 190 years
Dynasty XVII	5 kings of Thebes	–	43 shepherd & Theban, 151 years	[6] shepherd kings, 103 years
Total	43 shepherds & Theban	Total: 511 years	Total: 953 years	Total: 543 years

The versions of Manetho differ significantly for this period. Eusebius notably places the rulers of Africanus' Dynasty XV to Dynasty XVII, likely to accommodate his Biblical chronology. According to Josephus, the Hyksos domination, that is, the period between Dynasties XV until the end of Dynasty XVII, lasted 511 years, while Africanus attributes 518 years to Dynasty XVI alone. This is likely the summation of all three dynasties, because Josephus' sum of reigns for the Hyksos dynasty is actually 253 years and 10 months. This figure must be a century off, as the Turin King List only notes about 150 years.

=== Sixteenth Dynasty (Thebes) ===
According to Beckerath, the rulers of Dynasty XVI were vassals of the Hyksos. According to Ryholt, the 16th dynasty, ruling from Thebes, consisted of 15 kings recorded in the Turin King List, although most names are lost. Ryholt reconstruction has been criticized and it is not universally accepted. Virtually nothing is known about these rulers.

Proposed dates: c. 1640–1532 BC (108 years), c. 1650–1580 BC (70 years), c. 1649–1582 BC (67 years)

#	Image	Personal name	Throne name	Reign
1	Name lost			
2		Djehuty	Sekhemre Sementawy	3 years
3		Sobekhotep VIII	Sekhemre Seusertawy	16 years
4		Neferhotep III	Sekhemre Sankhtawy	1 year
5		Mentuhotepi	Seankhenre	1 year
6		Nebiryraw I	Sewadjenre	26 years
7		Nebiryraw II	Neferkare (?)	Lost
8		–	Semenre	Lost
9		Bebiankh	Seuserenre	12 years
10	–	Shedwaset	Sekhemre	Lost
15	five lines lost			

Reconstructions for Dynasty XVI

#	Ryholt	Schneider	Karnak King List	Turin King List	
1	Name lost	Sekhemraneferkhau Wepwawetemsaf		Name lost	
2	Sekhemre Sementawy Djehuty		Sekhemre Sementawy	Sekhemre [...]	3 years [...]
3	Sekhemre Seusertawy Sobekhotep VIII		Seusertawy	Sekhemre [...]	16 [years] [...]
4	Sekhemre Sankhtawy Neferhotep III			Sekhemre S[...]	1 year [...]
5	Seankhenre Mentuhotepi			Se[...]en[...]re [...]	1 year [...]
6	Sewadjenre Nebiryraw I		Sewadjenre	Nebiriawre	26 years [...]
7	Nebiryraw II			Nebitawre [...]	Lost
8	Semenre			Semenre	Lost
9	Seuserenre Bebiankh		Seuserenre	Seuserenre	12 years [...]
10	Sekhemre Shedwaset		Sekhemre	Sekhemre Shedwaset	Lost
11	Djedhotepre Dedumose I (uncertain)	Sekhemre Wadjkhaw Sobekemsaf I		[...]re	Lost
12	Djedneferre Dedumose II (uncertain)	Sekhemre-Wepmaat Intef		Lost	
13	Djedankhre Montemsaf (uncertain)	Sekhemre-Heruhirmaat Intef		[...]re [...]	Lost
14	Merankhre Mentuhotep VI (uncertain)	Nubkheperre Intef		Lost	
15	Seneferibre Senusret IV (uncertain)	Sekhemre Wahkhau Rahotep		Lost	
				Total: [1]5 kings [...]	

Beckerath's Dynasty XVI

Name
'Anat-Har	Yaqub-Har	Anati	Nubankhre	Wazad	Hibe
'Aper-'Anati	Jamu	Bebnum	Nikare II	Qur	Aped
Semqen	Jakebmu	Nebmaatre	[...]kare	Shenes	Hapi
Sakir-Har	Amu	Aahotepre	[...]kare	Inek	Shemsu
Apepi	Sneferankhre	Anetjerire	[...]kare	'A[...]	Meni[...]
Maaibre Sheshi	Hepu	Meribre	Sharek	'Ap[epi]	Werqa

=== Abydos Dynasty ===
The Turin King List records sixteen names after the Dynasty XVI, but the names do not match those of Dynasty XVII and thus likely refer to a different line. This dynasty is hypothesized by Kim Ryholt to have been a short-lived local line contemporaneous with the other dynasties. This has not been accepted by all scholars.

#	Image	Personal name	Throne name	Notes
1	–	–	Woser[...]re[...]	May belong to Senebkay.
2	–	–	[...]Woser[...]	May be the same as Seneferibre Senusret IV.
?		Wepwawetemsaf	Sekhemre-Neferkhau	May belong to the late 16th or 13th Dynasty.
?		Pantjeny	Sekhemre-Khutawy	May belong to the late 16th or 13th Dynasty.
?		Snaaib	Menkhaure	May belong to the late 13th Dynasty
?		Senebkay	Woseribre	Tomb found in 2014. Possibly the same as Sebkay.
?		Khuiqer	–	Attributed by Detlef Franke to the Abydos Dynasty.
11	–	–	[...]hebre	–
12	–	Name lost		Reigned 2 years.
13	–	Name lost		Reigned 2 years.
14	–	Name lost		Reigned 4 years.
15	–	–	[...]tere[...]	Reigned 3 years.
16	–	–	[...]nre	Last king recorded in the Turin King List, reigned 3 years.

The Turin King List ends here, recording a total of 223 kings. According to the reconstructions used here, the original Egyptian annals recorded roughly 243 kings until this point (and 270 up to Ramesses II). The whole section after Dynasty XVI is badly damaged, and thus Ryholt's reconstruction can't be proven with certainty. The total for Dynasty I–XVI thus amounts to 227 kings for a period of 1 1/2 millennia.

=== Seventeenth Dynasty (Thebes) ===
The succession of the last three kings of the Seventeenth Dynasty is attested in the Tomb of Khabekhnet and Table of Qenherkhopshef, but the placement of the previous ruler is problematic. The Karnak King List includes the throne names of Sekhemre Wahkhau Rahotep, Sobekemsaf I, and Nubkheperre Intef, but they are not in order. These Theban kings ruled an area from Elephantine to Abydos. They likely began as minor vassals of the Hyksos, as their origins are very obscure. The last kings fought and defeated the Hyksos, and established the New Kingdom of Egypt.

Kyholt identified 9 kings of this line, although the exact order is uncertain. Beckerath included 6 additional names belonging to kings that Ryholt placed on the previous dynasties (Sekhemre Sementawy Djehuty, Seankhenre Mentuhotepi, Nebiryraw I, Nebiryraw II, Semenre, and Bebiankh). Hornung postulates that the rulers between Dynasties XIII and XVIII ruled for roughly a century.

Proposed dates: c. 1645–1550 BC (95 years), c. 1640–1550 BC (90 years), c. 1580–1550 BC (30 years)

#	Image	Personal name	Throne name	Notes	Reign
1		Rahotep	Sekhemre Wahkhau	Believed by Kyholt to be the founder of the dynasty. Probably reigned close to Sekhemrekhutawy Pantjeny and Wepwawetemsaf, who produced stelas similar to his. According to Bunson, he erected a pyramid at the necropolis of Thebes.	–
2		Sobekemsaf I	Sekhemre-Wadjkhaw	May be part of Dynasty XVI.	–
3		Sobekemsaf II	Sekhemre-Shedtawy	May be part of Dynasty XVI. Tomb was robbed during the reign of Ramesses IX	c. 7 years
4		Intef V	Sekhemre-Wepmaat	Known for issuing the Coptos Decree to punish one Teti, Son of Minhotep. Hornung calls him Intef VI.	–
5		Intef VI	Nubkheperre	Probably a son of Sobekemsaf I, and brother of Intef VII. Hornung calls him Intef VIII.	c. 3 years
6		Intef VII	Sekhemre-Heruhirmaat	Probably the father of Senakhtenre Ahmose; ruled in opposition to the Hyksos ruler Apepi. Hornung calls him Intef VII.	–
7		Ahmose "the Elder"	Senakhtenre	Tomb and name discovered in 2012. Previously thought to be named Tao, thus making his son and successor Tao II. Said to have been part of a "second group" of Dynasty XVII.	c. 4 years
8		Tao "the Brave"	Seqenenre	Well attested in contemporary sources, father of Ahmose I and Kamose. He was killed during his war against the Hyksos.	–
9		Kamose	Wadjkheperre	Son of Tao and brother of Ahmose I. Achieved great military victories against the Hyksos. He died either of battle wounds or because of natural causes. Adopted the horse, introduced by the Hyksos, as part of the Egyptian military.	c. 1543–1540 BC (~3 years)

== New Kingdom (c. 1550–1075 BC) ==
The New Kingdom is considered the greatest period in Egyptian history. It began with the expulsion of the Hyksos, and it saw Egypt's greatest territorial extent. The Egyptians expanded far into Nubia in the south, and held wide territories in the Near East. Three of the best-known pharaohs originate from this period. These are Akhenaten, whose exclusive worship of the Aten is often interpreted as the first instance of monotheism, Tutankhamun, known for the discovery of his nearly intact tomb, and Ramesses II the Great, who attempted to recover the territories in the Levant that had been held in the Eighteenth Dynasty. His reconquest led to the Battle of Kadesh, where he led the Egyptian armies against the Hittite king Muwatalli II. The ensuing Egyptian–Hittite peace treaty is the oldest of its kind.

The accession of Ahmose I and the beginning of the New Kingdom can be securely dated to c. 1550 BC (± 10 years), which is also the date adopted by most scholars. Radiocarbon studies have yielded two intervals for Ahmose's date of accession: 1570–1544 BC and 1564–1528 BC. While most scholars use Shaw's figure of c. 1550 BC, Hornung argues in favor of an slightly later date, c. 1540 BC. Many of the reign lengths given by Manetho, as preserved by Josephus, appear to be confirmed by contemporary sources. The years are mostly derived only from the highest known year of each pharaoh, meaning that there is still some uncertainty on their exactitude.

=== Eighteenth Dynasty ===
The Eighteenth dynasty lasted roughly 250 years and was the longest-reigning native Egyptian dynasty. (Note: The longest-reigning dynasty overall was the Ptolemaic, which ruled for 275 years. Another foreign dynasty, the Twenty-second, ruled c. 200 years. After the 18th dynasty, the longest-reigning native dynasty was the Twelfth, which ruled c. 180 years. Additionally, the exact duration of the First dynasty is uncertain but it might have lasted between 170 and 375 years, the latter option exceeding all known durations of any ancient Egyptian dynasty.) It started as a continuation of the Seventeen dynasty, with Ahmose I being the brother of Kamose. However, the death of Amenhotep I without known children ended the male line, bringing the common-born Thutmose I to the throne. Thutmose probably married into the royal family by marrying two presumed daughters of Ahmose I, Ahmose and Mutnofret. If the identification of Mutnofret as a child of Ahmose is correct, that would mean that–via her issue–the family composed of members of the Seventeenth and Eighteenth dynasties ruled Egypt for nearly three centuries, until Tutankhamun's death.

Proposed dates: 1550–1307 BC (243 years), 1550–1295 BC (255 years), 1550–1292 BC (258 years), 1539–1292 BC (247 years). Regnal years may still be off by one or two years at most.

#	Image	Personal name	Throne name	Notes	Reign
1		Ahmose I	Nebpehtire	Son of Seqenenre Tao and brother of Kamose, began his rule as a child and ruled for a decade under the regency of his mother Ahhotep I. Expelled the Hyksos and reunified Egypt during his 19th year of his reign. Also built the last Egyptian pyramid. Died aged around 35, which would place his accession at age 10 and the reunification of Egypt at age 29. Left an almost intact mummy.	c. 1540–1515 BC (~25 years)
2		Amenhotep I	Djeserkare	Son of Ahmose I and Ahmose-Nefertari, who probably ruled as regent briefly. Rebuilt several temples in Upper Egypt, particularly in Karnak. Was also the first pharaoh to separate his tomb from his mortuary temple and burial complex. Died aged around 35, which would place his accession at age 15. Left an intact mummy that has never been unwrapped.	c. 1514–1494 BC (~20 years)
3		Thutmose I Khamyre	Aakheperkare	Possible son-in-law of Ahmose I by his marriages to Queen Ahmose and Queen Mutnofret. Continued the building and military projects of his predecessor, but further expanded Egyptian power over foreign territories, campaigning into the Levant. His mummy was once thought to have been recovered, but it turned out to be incompatible with Thutmose I.	c. 1493–1483 BC (~10 years)
4		Thutmose II; Neferkhau	Aakheperenre	Son of Thutmose I; his reign was dominated by his wife and half-sister Hatshepsut. Left a mummy estimated to be around 30 years old.	c. 1482–1480 BC (~2–3 years)
5		Thutmose III "the Great"; Neferkheperu	Menkheperre	Began his rule as child under the regency and co-rule of Hatshepsut. One of the most powerful pharaohs, he conquered much of the Near East from the Euphrates to Nubia, marking the geographical peak of the Egyptian empire. His multiple military campaigns are recorded in detail in the Annals of Thutmose III. Tales of his military conquest are possibly one of the origins of the legendary king Sesostris recorded by Herodotus.	28 April 1479– 11 March 1425 BC (Note: Thutmose III's reign is known to the day thanks to official records and astronomical calculations. His reign began in Year 1, I Shemu (9th month), day 4, and ended in Year 54, III Peret (7th month), day 30. Beckerath claims that it is a "chronological certainty" that his accession was on 28 April 1479, and then calculates that his death occurred on 11 March 1425. The sole reign of Thutmose III began on Year 22, II Peret (6th month), day 10, and thus lasted 32 years and 50 days. The Egyptian calendar does not match the Gregorian calendar; each of the 12 months was exactly 30 days, and there was an intercalary month of 5 days to complete the 365-cycle.) (53 years, 331 days)
6		Khenemet Amun; Hatshepsut♀	Maatkare	Second known female ruler of Egypt, called the "most successful queen-pharaoh". Began as regent of her stepson Thutmose III, but quickly sidelined him and adopted masculine titles. Reigned over a prosperous Egypt and conducted several grand building projects, such as her Mortuary Temple at Deir el-Bahari. Probably died of natural causes. Later pharaohs tried to erase the memory of her reign, perhaps as a rejection of female rule.	28 April 1479– 29 January 1457 BC (including regency) (Note: Hatshepsut became pharaoh between Year 2 and 7 of Thutmose III, but her official regnal count retroactively included into her reign the time she had served as regent, therefore his date of ascension –Year 1, I Shemu (9th month), day 4– also became hers. Her reign is thought to have ended on Year 22, II Peret (6th month), day 10. James Peter Allen equals this to 16 January 1458 BC, but Beckerath dates her death to January 1457 BC, which follows closer the actual sum of days. Adding 21 years, 281 days (9 months + 6 days + 5 intercalary days), to 28 April 1479 BC gives 29 January 1457 BC.) (21 years, 281 days, de jure ~14–19 years)
7		Amenhotep II; Heqaiunu	Aakheperure	Son of Thutmose III; described as an athletic man. Continued to launch military campaigns.	c. 1425–1400 BC (Note: It is unclear if Amenhotep began his rule as co-ruler for a couple of years. If he was named co-ruler, his reign likely began the day after his father's death, i.e. Year 1 IV Peret (8th month), day 1. If not, it may have begun in Year 3, III Shemu (9th month), day 15.) (~25 years)
8		Thutmose IV	Menkheperure	Son of Amenhotep II. Remembered for restoring the Great Sphinx of Giza and writing the Dream Stele. Established peaceful relations with the Mitanni state, opposing the Hittite Empire.	c. 1400–1390 BC (~10 years)
9		Amenhotep III "the Great"; Heqawaset	Nebmaatre	Considered one of the greatest pharaohs; ruled at the peak of the Egyptian Empire, when the country reached its economic, artistic, and military height. Some of his foreign affairs are recorded in the Amarna letters.	c. 1390–1353 BC (~37 years)
Amarna period
10		Akhenaten	Neferkheperure Waenre	Sometimes called the first monotheist. Began his reign as Amenhotep IV, but quickly changed it to express his devotion to the sun-god Aten, whom he placed at the top of the Egyptian pantheon. Also built a new capital, Akhetaten (now Amarna). His religious reforms were not widely accepted, and later pharaohs tried to erase all memory of his reign. Was also a patron of the distinctive Amarna art.	c. December 1353– c. September 1336 BC (Note: The reign of Akhenaten began on the first 8 days of Peret (5th month) and likely ended on Year 17, II Akhet (2nd month), a date "corresponding to August 22 to September 20 [Julian] in 1336 BC".) (16 years, 10 months)
11		Smenkhkare; Djoser Kheperu	Ankhkheperure	Disputed family background and sex, viewed variously as Akenaten's son, brother, or wife. Sometimes identified with female Pharaoh Neferneferuaten who ruled from Thebes. Attested mainly in Amarna. Might have been Akhenaten's co-regent.	c. 1336–1334 BC (~2 years)
12		Neferneferuaten♀	Ankhetkheperure Merwaenre	Third female pharaoh of Egypt. She is sometimes identified with King Smenkhkare, who shared the male form of her throne name. "Neferneferuaten" is believed to be a regnal name adopted most likely by Nefertiti, Akhenaten's main wife.	c. 1334–1333 BC (a few years)
13		Tutankhamun; Heqaiunu-shemau	Nebkheperure	Arguably the most famous male pharaoh in modern times. His tomb was found almost intact thanks to the entrance being buried in antiquity. Born as Tutankhaten to uncertain parents (possibly Akhenaten and his sister), his reign saw the reversal of several of Akhenaten's policies. He changed his name and abandoned Amarna in favour of Thebes, where he died aged about 18.	c. 1333–1324 BC (about a decade)
14		Itnetjer; Ay II	Kheperkheperure Irmaat	Vizier since the reign of Akhenaten, speculated to be his father-in-law as possible father to Queen Nefertiti; married Tutankhamun's wife Ankhesenamun, who might have been also his own granddaughter. His tomb was later destroyed by his successor.	c. 1323–1320 BC (~3 years)
End of Amarna period
15	"head of Horemheb"	Horemheb; Meryamun	Djeserkheperure Setepenre	Senior official; married Mutnedjmet, speculated to be sister of Nefertiti and daughter of Ay. Initiated a vigorous campaign of damnatio memoriae ("condemnation of memory") against the Armana rulers, even dating his own reign from the death of Amenhotep III, effectively erasing 34 years of history.	c. 1319–1292 BC (26 years, x months)

Comparison of Manethonian royal lists

Pharaoh and years		Josephus			Africanus			Eusebius		
Ahmose I	~25	(1st) Tethmosis	Τεθμωσις	25y 4m	(1st) Amos	Aμως	25	(1st) Amosis	Aμωσις	25
Amenhotep I	~20	(2nd) Chebron	Χεβρων	13y	(2nd) Chebros	Χεβρως	13	(2nd) Chebron	Χεβρων	13
Thutmose I	~10	(3rd) Amenophis	Aμενωφις	20y 7m	(3rd) Amenophthis	Αμενωφθις	24	(3rd) Ammenophis	Aμμενωφίς	21
Thutmose II	~2	(4th) Amesses♀	Aμεσσης	21y 9m	(4th) Amensis	Αμενσις	22	(4th) Miphres	Μιφρης	12
Hatshepsut♀	~21	(5th) Mephres	Μηφρης	12y 9m	(5th) Misaphris	Μισαφρις	13	–		
Sum of years: ~78 years			(Sum: 91 years, 5 months) (Note: This is the sum of Josephus' figures; the subdivision is only found in Africanus and Eusebius. Josephus' total, excluding Queen Hatshepsut, is 71 years, 8 months. The original text likely counted the years between Ahmose I and the beginning of Thutmose III's sole reign, acknowledging that Hatshepsut ruled as senior co-ruler. However, Manetho's scribes misunderstood the text. Africanus' subtotal is notably off by several years, while Eusebius completely omits Hatshepsut.)			Sum: 69 years			Sum: 71 years	
Thutmose III	32y 1m	(6) Mephramouthosis	Μηφραμουθωσις	25y 10m	(6) Misphragmuthosis	Μισφραγμουθωσις	26	(5) Myspharmuthosis	Μισφραγμουθωσις	26
Amenhotep II	~25	(7) Thmosis	Θμωσις	9y 8m	(7) Touthmosis	Τουθμωσις	9	(6) Touthmosis	Τουθμωσις	9
Thutmose IV	~10	(8) Amenophis	Aμένωφις	30y 10m	(8) Amenophis	Αμενωφις	31	(7) Amenophis	Aμενωφις	31
Amenhotep III	~37	(9) Oros	Ωρος	36y 5m	(9) Oros	Ωρος	37	(8) Oros	Ωρος	36
Akhenaten	16y 10m	(10) Akenkheres♀	Aκεγχερης	12y 1m	(10) Akherres	Αχερρης	32	(9) Akhenkherses	Aχενχερσης	12
Smenkhkare	~2	(11) Rhathotis	Pαθωτις	9y	(11) Rathos	Ραθως	6	(10) Athoris	Aθωρις	39
Neferneferuaten♀	~1	(12) Akenkheres	Aκεγχηρης	12y 5m	(12) Chebres	Χεβρης	12	(11) Khenkheres	Χενχερης	16
Tutankhamun	~9	(13) Akenkheres	Aκεγχηρης	12y 3m	(13) Akherres	Aχερρης	12	(12) Akherres	Aχερρης	8
Ay II	~3	–	–	–	–	–	–	(13) Kherres	Χερρης	15
Horemheb	~27	(14) Armais	Aρμαις	4y 1m	(14) Armesis	Aρμεσης	5	(14) Armais	Aρμαις	5
Sum of years: ~240 years			(Sum: 246 years)		(15) Ramesses	Ραμεσσης	19	(15) Rhamesses	Ραμεσσης	68
Ramesses I	~1	(1st) Rhamesses	Pαμεσσης	1y 4m	(16) Amenophath	Αμενωφαθ	19	(16) Ammenophis	Aμμενωφις	40
Ramesses II	66y 2m	(2nd) Armesses Miamun	Aρμεσσης Μιαμουν	66y 2m		Sum: 263 years			Sum: 348 years	

Reconstructed regnal list of Manetho

#	Historical Pharaoh		Manetho		
1	Ahmose I	~25	(1st) Amosis	Aμωσις	25y 4m
2	Amenhotep I	~20	(3rd) Amenophis	Aμενωφις	20y 7m
3	Thutmose I Kheperen	~10	(5th) Mephres (Note: The name "Chebren" is a corruption of Kheperen, derived from the throne name of Thutmose I and II. The name "Mephres" is a corruption of Menkheperre, the throne name of Thutmose III. Most scholars believe that "Chebron" refers to Thutmose II. Mephramouthosis is thus probably a corruption of Menkheperre Thutmosis (Thutmose III). His reign probably corresponds to Josephus' "30 years", itself derived from his sole reign.)	Μηφρης	12y 9m
4	Thutmose II Kheperen	~3	(2nd) Chebron	Χεβρων	13y
5	Hatshepsut♀	21y 9m	(4th) Amesses♀	Aμεσσης	21y 9m
6	Thutmose III Menkheperre	32y 1m	(6th) Mephramouthosis	Μηφραμουθωσις	(8th) 30y 10m
7	Amenhotep II	~25	(8th) Amenophis	Aμένωφις	(6th) 25y 10m
8	Thutmose IV	~10	(7th) Thmosis	Θμωσις	(7th) 9y 8m
9	Amenhotep III	~37	(9th) Oros	Ωρος	(9th) 36y 5m
10	Akhenaten	16y 10m	(12th) Akenkheres	Aκεγχηρης	12y 5m
11	Smenkhkare	~2	(13th) Akenkheres	Aκεγχηρης	12y 3m
12	Neferneferuaten♀	~2	(10th) Akenkheres♀	Aκεγχερης	12y 1m
13	Tutankhamun	~9	(11th) Rhathotis	Pαθωτις	9y
14	Ay II	~3	(14th) Armais	Aρμαις	4y 1m
15	Horemheb	~27	–	–	–
		~245			246 years

Despite being the best-documented period in Egypt's history, almost all of Manetho's names and reign lengths were mixed. His sources were likely already corrupted due to the damnatio memoriae imposed over the Amarna rulers, and co-regency may have caused additional confusion. The period c. 1540–1292 BC spans 248 years; the sum of estimates reigns amounts to a minimum of 245 years, which closely matches Josephus' sum of 246 years.

=== Nineteenth Dynasty (Ramesside) ===
The Nineteenth Dynasty ruled from approximately 1292 to 1190 BC and includes one of the most famous pharaohs: Ramesses the Great.

#	Image	Personal name	Throne name	Notes	Reign
1		Ramesses I	Menpehtyre	Vizier and chosen successor of Horemheb, with whom he briefly shared the throne. Had a rather brief and unremarkable reign.	c. 1292–1291 BC (~1 year)
2		Seti I Merenptah	Menmaatre	Also served as vizier and military commander before succeeding his father. Led several military campaigns and faced the Hittites. His tomb is the largest in the Valley of the Kings.	c. 1290–1279 BC (Note: It is often stated that his coronation took place on III Shemu 24, although it may refer to his death.) (~11 years)
3		Ramesses II "the Great"; Meryamun	Usermaatre Setepenre	Regarded as one of the most powerful pharaohs of Egypt, as well as its longest-reigning and longest-living monarch, possibly only behind Pepi II Neferkare. Also had one of the longest reigns in recorded history. Conducted more military campaigns and built more monuments than any other pharaoh. Also known by the Greek name Ozymandias, after the first part of his prenomen Usermaatre. Known to have had about 100 children. Died aged around 91, which would place his accession at age 25. He was also one of the few pharaohs to be deified in their lifetime.	31 May 1279– 27 July 1213 BC (Note: Ramesses II began his reign on Year 1, III Shemu (11th month), day 27, which Beckerath equals to 31 May 1279 BC, and died on Year 67, II Akhet (2nd month), day 6. This equates to a total of 66 years, 2 months, 14 days according to the Egyptian calendar, or 66 years and 74 days.) (66 years, 74 days)
4		Merneptah; Hotephermaat	Baenre Meryamun	The 13th son of Ramesses II, was already an old man when he took the throne. Faced the first wide attack of the Sea Peoples.	1213–1203 (Note: Merneptah's reign began between 19/I Akhet and 13/II Akhet, which perfectly aligns with Ramesses II's death on 6/II Akhet. His highest date is likely 7/IV/ Akhet, Year 10. Beckerath gives his death as 3 May 1203, but this is solely based on Manetho. The date is derived from adding 10 years (Manetho writes 19) and 6 months to the aforementioned 13/II Akhet, which Beckerath calculates as 3 August 1213. Because of this, his exact date of death remains uncertain.) (9 years, x months)
5		Seti II; Meryenptah	Userkheperure Setepenre	Faced an internal coup orchestrated by his son or brother Amenmesse at the beginning of his reign, but defeated him and erased him from official records.	c. 1203–1198 BC (Note: The accession of Seti II probably took place on, or shortly after, the 29th day of II Peret (6th month). His death was announced in Thebes in Year 6, I Peret (5th month), day 19. His successor began his reign on I Peret, day 1–3, which places Seti's death at the end of IV Akhet (4th month). The exact chronology of events surrounding Amenmesse's usurpation is not clear. Beckerath proposes that the reign of Seti II actually began after Amenmesse's, c. December 1200/1199.) (5 years, ~10 months)
6		Amenmesse; Heqawaset	Menmire Setepenre	Rival king in opposition to his brother or father Seti II; exact chronology disputed.	c. 1203–1200 BC (Note: Amenmesse's accession took place around II Shemu (10th month), more precisely between 27/I/Shemu and 18/III/ Shemu. His last known date is Year 4, 29/III/ Shemu. Beckerath proposes that the reign of Amenmesse began on 3 May 1203, immediately after that of Merneptah.) (3 years, 1–2 months)
7		Merneptah; Siptah	Akhenre Setepenre (Sekhaienre Meryamun)	Son of Seti II (or Amenmesse), installed by Chancellor Bay under the regency of Tausret. Began his reign as Ramesses Siptah, but quickly changed it, possibly to claim direct descent from Merneptah.	c. 1198–1192 BC (Note: Siptah began his reign on I Peret (5th month), day 1–3, and died on Year 7, II Akhet, day 10–12. Some authors argue that he died on Year 6.) (6 years, 285 days)
8		Tausret; Setepenmut♀	Sitre Meritamun	Fourth female ruler of Egypt and last native queen regnant. Seti II's widow, initially regent for Siptah, then briefly sole pharaoh after his death. Like Hatshepsut before her, records of her reign were destroyed by later pharaohs.	c. 1198–1191 BC (including regency) (Note: Tausret probably died on I Shemu (9th month), Year 8. While her reign de jure lasted 2–4 years, she retroactively reckoned it as a continuation of Siptah's, who reigned from the start of I Peret (5th month).) (7 years, 4 months, de jure ~2 years)

Manethonian royal lists

#	Pharaoh and years		Josephus			Africanus			Eusebius		
1	Ramesses I	~1	Rhamesses	Pαμεσσης	1y 4m	Sethos	Σεθως	51	Sethos	Σεθως	55
2	Seti I	~11	–	–	–	Rapsakes	Ραψακης	61	Rampses	Ραμψης	66
3	Ramesses II Meryamun	66y 2m	Armesses Miamun	Aρμεσσης Μιαμουν	66y 2m	Amenephthes	Aμενεφθης	20	Ammenephthis	Aμμενεφθίς	40
4	Merneptah	9	Amenophis	Aμενωφις	19y 6m	Ramesses	Ραψακης	60	–	–	–
5	Seti II	5	Sethos	Σεθως	59y	Ammenemnes	Aμμενεμνης	5	Ammenemes	Aμμενεμης	26
6	(Amenmesse)	(3)				Thouoris	Θουωρις	7	Thouoris	Θουωρις	7
7	Siptah & Tausret	7				Total of years: 209 (sum is 204)			Total of years: 194 years		
	Total of years: ~102 years (Note: The main difficulty in determining the exact duration of the dynasty is the lack of data for the first two pharaohs. The simple sum of total years gives 99 years, but the addition of months raises this figure to roughly 102 years, while the subtraction of dates (1292–1191) gives 101 years. Manetho's original number was probably "104 years", which was corrupted into "204" by Africanus, and "194" by Eusebius.)										

Here ends the Second Book of Manetho, which records 96 kings, ruling for 2121 years according to Africanus (92 kings in 1121 years according to Eusebius). However, the correct sum of Africanus' dynasties comes to a puzzling 246 kings for 2221 years. The reconstructed chronology for Dynasties XII to XIX shows that about 190 kings ruled for roughly 560 years.

=== Twentieth Dynasty (Ramesside) ===
The Twentieth Dynasty ruled from roughly 1190 to 1077 BC. Shaw dated the dynasty to 1186–1069 BC.

(#) – Existence disputed

#	Image	Personal name	Throne name	Notes	Reign
1		Setnakhte; Meryamunre	Userkhaure Setepenre	An elderly man of unknown origin, perhaps a descendant of Ramesses II. Presented himself as a restorer after the unpopular reign of Queen Tausret. May have taken the throne after a brief period of anarchy.	c. 1190–1188 BC (Note: Setnakhte probably began his reign on II Shemu and died on Year 3, I Shemu, day 25, shortly before completing his 3rd regnal year.) (2 years, 11 months)
2		Ramesses III; Heqaiunu	Usermaatre Meryamun	Arguably the last great Egyptian pharaoh, he reigned during the Late Bronze Age collapse that saw the collapse of several neighboring civilizations. Defended Egypt from the Sea Peoples, but ended up being assassinated during the Harem conspiracy led by Queen Tiye and their son Pentawer.	c. 1187–1157 BC (Note: Ramesses III began his reign on I Shemu, day 26, and likely died in Year 32, III Shemu, day 14.) (31 years, 48 days)
3		Ramesses IV; Heqamaat Meryamun	Heqamaatre Setepenamun	Son of Ramesses III, executed the Harem conspirators after assuming the throne.	c. 1156–1150 BC (Note: Ramesses IV began his reign on III Shemu (11th month), day 15, and died in Year 7, around IV Peret (8th month). There is uncertainty about the exact chronology; his death may have occurred as early as I Peret (5th month).) (6 years, ~9 months)
4		Ramesses V Amunherkhepeshef	Usermaatre Sekheperenre	Son of Ramesses IV, his reign saw an epidemic of smallpox that likely ended with his life, as well as many members of his family.	c. 1149–1146 BC (Note: Ramesses V began his reign between I Peret (5th month) and IV Peret (8th month), and ended in Year 3, II Peret (6th month). Krauss assigns him a reign of 3 years 10 months, accepting an accession date in IV Peret.) (3 years, ~10 months)
5		Ramesses VI; Amunherkhepeshef Netjerheqaiunu	Nebmaatre Meryamun	Son of Ramesses III and uncle of Ramesses V, he likely usurped the throne after a civil war, which further contributed to the economic decline of Egypt.	c. 1145–1139 BC (Note: Ramesses VI began his reign around II Peret, day 8, and died sometime after Year 8, II Peret, day 11. Additional evidence points to a reign of 7 years and 9 months.) (7 years, 9 months)
6		Ramesses VII; Itiamun Netjerheqaiunu	Usermaatre Setpenre Meryamun	Son of Ramesses VI, the end of his reign likely saw a succession crisis.	c. 1138–1131 BC (Note: The accession date of Ramesses VII is highly disputed. Beckerath dates it to the end of III Peret (7th month). His highest known date may have been Year 8, IV Shemu, day 25, but it has been argued that it belongs to Ramesses IX instead. The accession date of Ramesses VIII is also disputed, having been dated between I Peret (5th month) and I Akhet (1st month), or potentially earlier. He died on I Akhet, day 20, potentially having reigned for a full year.) (7 years, 5–10 months?)
7		Ramesses VIII; Sethherkhepeshef Meryamun	Usermaatre Akhenamun	Last surviving son of Ramesses III, ruled very briefly.	c. 1130 BC (1 year or less)
8		Ramesses IX; Khaemwaset Mereramun	Neferkare Setpenre	Grandson of Ramesses III thru his father Montuherkhopshef, last pharaoh to rule over Nubia. By this time, the High Priest of Amun had already become the de facto rulers of Egypt.	c. 1129–1111 BC (Note: The reign of Ramesses IX probably began on I Akhet (1st month), day 21, and ended in Year 19, I Peret (5th month), day 26.) (18 years, 125 days)
9		Ramesses X Amunherkhepeshef Meryamun	Khepermaatre Setepenre	Son of Ramesses IX, the Libyans invaded Thebes during his reign.	c. 1110–1107 BC (Note: The reign of Ramesses X probably began on I Peret (5th month), day 26, and ended sometime after Year 3, IV Akhet (4 month). However, he may have ruled until Year 4. A figure of 3 years and 10 months have been proposed by Demarée.) (3 years, 10 months?)
10		Ramesses XI; Khamwaset Meryamun Netjerheqaiunu	Menmaatre Setepenptah	Son of Ramesses X, faced a massive revolt in Thebes. Egypt was already split by his reign, with the priests of Amun ruling over the south.	c. 1106–1077 BC (Note: The reign of Ramesses XI probably began on III or IV Shemu (11th or 12th month), and ended sometime after his 28th year; the exact date is uncertain.) (~29 years?)
*		Ramesses XII; Mereramun	Usermaatre Heqawaset	Theorized by Ian Mladjov to have been a short-lived king. Only attested in a single inscription, which is itself the subject of much debate. May be a variant of Ramesses II's name.	–

For the Twentieth Dynasty, Africanus records 12 kings ruling for 135 years. This actually coincides perfectly with the period between Merneptah (1213 BC) and Ramesses XI (1078 BC). The sum of reigns is roughly 110 years.

== Third Intermediate period (c. 1075–664 BC) ==
Following the Late Bronze Age collapse, the Egyptian Empire collapsed and fragmented once more. The rulers of the Twenty-first Dynasty claimed to rule over all of Egypt, but in practice their influence was limited to Lower Egypt, with the High Priests of Amun ruling over Upper Egypt. The Twenty-second Dynasty maintained control over Egypt for a few decades, but their power soon deteriorated due to infighting. This led to the rise of several competing royal lines in Thebes, Heracleopolis, Hermopolis, Leontopolis, and Tanis, which are collectively known as the Twenty-third Dynasty. Another short-lived line, from Sais, is referred to as the Twenty-fourth Dynasty.

The fragmentation of Egypt came to an end with the arrival of the Nubian kings of Kush, who conquered Egypt c. 745 BC . This was the first time all of Egypt was ruled by foreigners (the Hyksos mostly ruled in Lower Upper), although the Nubians were highly Egyptianized and considered themselves legitimate pharaohs, even reviving the tradition of pyramid building (the last pyramid was built by Ahmose I nearly 800 years before).

While not as chaotic as the previous two intermediate periods, the lack of official king lists makes it difficult to reconstruct the exact succession of rulers. The only surviving king list is that of Manetho, which is likely based on a biased source dated to the Kushite period. Note that the sum of items does not match the stated total of years.

Manetho's Dynasties XXI to XXV

Dynasty XXI	Dynasty XXII	Dynasty XXIII	Dynasty XXIV & XXV
7 kings of Tanis, 130 years: Smendes, 26 years.; Psousennes, 41 years.; Nephelkheres, 4 years.; Amenophthis, 9 years.; Osokhor, 6 years.; Psinakhes, 9 years; Psousennes, 35 years.	9 kings of Bubastus, 120 years: Sesônchis, 21 years.; Osorthôn, 15 years.; Three kings, 25 years.; Takelôthis, 13 years.; Three kings, 42 years.	4 kings of Tanis, 120 years: Petoubatēs, 40 years; Osorkhō, 8 years; Psammous, 10 years.; Zēt, 31 years.	1 king of Sais: Bokhkhoris, 6 years.; 3 kings of Ethiopia, 40 years: Sabakon, 8 years; Sebikhos, 14 years; Tarkos, 18 years

=== Twenty-first Dynasty (Tanis) ===
Most scholars date the 21st dynasty to c. 1070–945 BC; Ian Shaw dates it to c. 1069–945 BC. The native Egyptian names are given in small italics.

#	Image	Personal name	Throne name	Notes	Reign
1		Smendes I Nesbanebdjed Meryamun	Hedjkheperre Setepenre	Took the throne after the death of Ramesses XI and married his daughter. Ruled alongside Pinedjem I, the High Priest of Amun and effective pharaoh at Thebes, from his 16th year onwards.	c. 1076–1052 BC (~24 years)
2		Amenemnisu	Neferkare Heqawast	Co-ruler of Smendes; possibly a son of Herihor, exact chronology uncertain.	uncertain
3		Psusennes I Pasebakhaenniut Meryamun	Aakheperre Setepenamun	Son of the High Priest Pinedjem I. His tomb at Tanis is the only fully intact ancient Egyptian royal tomb ever found.	c. 1051–1002 BC (~49 years)
4		Amenemope	Usermaatre Setepenamun	Son of Psusennes I and co-ruler for a couple of years. Buried inside the intact tomb of Psusennes I.	c. 1002–993 BC (~9 years)
5		Osorkon "the Elder"; Meryamun	Aakheperre Setepenre	Scholars initially doubted his existence, hence the lack of a regnal number. Left no surviving monuments. His accession almost certainly took place in the year 992 BC, based on an astronomical calculation.	992–987 BC (~5 years)
6		Siamun	Netjerikheperre Setpenamun	Son of Psusennes I.	986–968 BC (~18 years)
7		Psusennes II; Hor Pasebakhaenniut Meryamun	Titkheperre Setepenre	Son of the High Priest Pinedjem II. His daughter married the future pharaoh Shoshenq I.	c. 967–944 BC (~23 years)

==== High Priests of Amun ====
The High Priests of Amun at Thebes were the de facto rulers of Upper Egypt during the Twenty-first dynasty, writing their names in cartouches, being buried in royal tombs, and passing their office to their sons. They likely did not consider themselves actual pharaohs, but their use of royal titles implied an equivalent level of authority. Dates are taken from Payraudeau (2020), which may not perfectly align with Hornung's. There is insufficient evidence to reconstruct a reliable chronology of these rulers.

(#) – only ever High Priest of Amun
(#) – Existence disputed

#	Image	Priest	Notes	Reign
(1)		Piankh	Previously believed to be a son-in-law of Herihor, but the evidence for this has been refuted, and scholars now believe that Piankh actually ruled before Herihor. According to another theory, Piankh may have served as High Priest during Herihor's reign, but this is also uncertain.	uncertain (under Ramesses XI)
(2)		Herihor; Siamun	Officer under Ramesses XI, adopted royal titulary at Thebes, possibly after the death of Ramesses XI, thus becoming ruler in the South alongside the Tanite pharaoh in the North.	c. 1070–1063 BC (High Priest) c. 1063–1054 BC (Pharaoh) (~16 years, de jure ~9 years)
(3)		Pinedjem I Meryamun	Son of Piankh, and father of Pharaoh Psusennes I. Assumed full pharaonic titulature.	c. 1063–1054 BC (High Priest) c. 1054–1032 BC (Pharaoh) (~31 years, de jure ~22 years)
(4)		Masaharta	Son of Pinedjem I.	c. 1054–1046 BC (~8 years)
(5)	–	Djedkhonsuefankh	Son of Pinedjem I.	c. 1046–1045 BC (~1 year)
(6)		Menkheperre	Son of Pinedjem I and brother of Djedkhonsuefankh, whom he succeeded. Adopted pharaonic titles.	c. 1045–990 BC (~55 years)
(7)		Smendes II; Nesbanebdjed	Son of Menkheperre, succeeded him as an old man.	c. 990–988 BC (~2 years)
(8)		Pinedjem II	Likely a son of Menkheperre.	c. 988–966 BC (~22 years)
(9)	–	Psusennes III; Pasebakhaenniut	Son of Pinedjem II; most likely the same person as Pharaoh Psusennes II.	c. 966–943 BC (~23 years)

=== Twenty-second Dynasty (Libyan) ===
The succession of kings of this dynasty is highly disputed; the following reconstruction is mostly based on Hornung, but dates follow Frédéric Payraudeau (2020). (Note: In the table of rulers at the end of his book, Hornung follows Beckerath in listing 9 kings for Dynasty 22. However, the individual chapter discussing the same dynasty gives a different succession. There, Karl Jansen-Winkeln explains that three kings named "Shoshenq" should be placed between Osorkon and Takelot I. However, the dates in the table of rulers follow Rolf Krauss, who placed a single "Shoshenq II" after Takelot and gave him a single regnal year. Frédéric Payraudeau places two kings named "Shoshenq" after Takelot and gives them about 8 years of combined rule. As a result, the reign of Osorkon II is given as 865–830 by Payraudeau, and 872–842 by Krauss. The chronology of the first two kings is more certain, the combined reign of Shoshenq I and Osorkon I is given as 943–987 and 943–988, respectively.) Other scholars date the dynasty c. 945–715 BC, after Shaw. Despite the political turmoil of this period, this dynasty managed to last for roughly 200 years, being exceeded only by the Eighteenth and the Ptolemaic dynasties.

(#) – Status ambiguous

#	Image	Personal name	Throne name	Notes	Reign
1		Shoshenq I Meryamun	Hedjkheperre Setpenre	Son of a Libyan chief and nephew of Osorkon the Elder, married a daughter of Psusennes II. Appointed his children as High Priests of Amun and other relevant offices. Ruled from Bubastis and then Tanis; almost certainly the "Pharaoh Shishak" of the Hebrew Bible. His campaign against in Israel and Judah can be securely dated to the year 926 or 925 BC.	c. 943–922 BC (~21 years)
2		Osorkon I Meryamun	Sekhemkheperre Setepenre	Son of Shoshenq I and grandson of Psusennes II, continued with his father's military campaigns in the Levant.	c. 922–887 BC (~35 years)
3(?)		Takelot I Meryamun	Hedjkheperre Setepenre	Son of Osorkon I, put down a revolt in Thebes. Chronology disputed; ruled for at least 13 years.	c. 887–873 BC (?) (~14 years)
4(?)		Shoshenq IIa; Meryamun	Heqakheperre	Son of Osorkon I, initially High Priest of Amun. Died suddenly from an infected head wound. Buried in the intact tomb of Psusennes I. Perhaps Osorkon's successor.	uncertain (briefly)
5(?)	–	Shoshenq IIb; Meryamun	Tutkheperre Setepenre	Existence confirmed in the 2000s; placed as fourth king by Hornung.	uncertain (briefly)
6(?)		Shoshenq IIc; Meryamun	Maatkheperre Setepenre	Perhaps a co-ruler in Upper Egypt, or a short-lived rival pharaoh. Exact placement uncertain.	uncertain (briefly)
7		Osorkon II; Meryamun	Usermaatre Setpenamun	Son of Takelot I; his cousin and High Priest Harsiese usurped power at Thebes. Believed by some scholars to have been succeeded by Takelot II instead of Shoshenq III.	c. 865–830 BC (~35 years)
8		Shoshenq III; Sibaste Meryamun Netjerheqaon	Usermaatre Setpenre	Possibly a son of Osorkon II. Faced the usurpation of Harsiese and then Pedubast I. Egypt was fragmented during his reign.	c. 830–791 BC (~39 years)
9		Shoshenq IV; Meryamun Sabast Netjerheqaiunu	Hedjkheperre Setepenre	Sometimes seen as the successor of Pedubast I in Leontopolis and part of Dynasty XXIII. Called "Shoshenq IIIa" by Beckerath and Hornung.	c. 791–778 BC (~13 years)
10		Pami; Meryamun	Usermaatre Setpenre	Sometimes placed in Dynasty XXIII.	c. 778–769 BC (~9 years)
11		Shoshenq V	Aakheperre	Possibly brother of Pami and son of Shoshenq III. Sometimes placed in Dynasty XXIII alongside his son Osorkon IV.	c. 769–731 BC (~38 years)

The exact succession of rulers during the period of Dynasties 22 and 23 is highly disputed:

Comparison of modern regnal lists

Kitchen 1972	Beckerath 1999	Shaw 2000	London 2000	Mladjov 2021
Dynasty 22: 1. Shoshenq I 945–924; 2. Osorkon I 924–889; 3. Shoshenq II 890; 4. Takeloth I 889–874; 5. Osorkon II 874–850; 6. Harsiese 870–860; 7. Takeloth II 850–825; 8. Shoshenq III 825–773; 9. Pimay 773–767; 10. Shoshenq V 767–730; 11. Osorkon IV 730–715/3; Dynasty 23: 1. Pedubast I 818–793; 2. Iuput I 804–803; 3. Shoshenq IV 793–787; 4. Osorkon III 787–759; 5. Takelot III 764–757; 6. Rudamun 757–754; 7. Iuput II 754–720; 8. Shoshenq VI (??)	Dynasty 22: 1. Shoshenq I 945–924; 2. Osorkon I 924–890; 3. Takelot I 890–877; 4. Shoshenq II 877–875; 5. Osorkon II 875–837; 6. Shoshenq III 837–798/5; 7. Shoshenq IIIa 798–785; 8. Pami 785–774; 9. Shoshenq V 774–736; Upper Egyptian line: 1. Takelot II 841–816; 2. Pedubast I 830–805/00; 3. Iuput I, 816–800; 4. Shoshenq IV 805/0–790; 5. Osorkon III, 790–762; 6. Takelot III, 767–755; 7. Rudamun, 755–735; 8. Ini 735–730; Unplaced Shoshenq, Harsiese, Shepenupet (?, Shoshenq VI (? Dynasty 23: 1. Pedubast I 756–730; 2. Osorkon IV 730–722; 3. Psammus? 722–712 (?)	Dynasty 22: 1. Shoshenq I 945–; 2. Osorkon I 3. Takelot I 4. Osorkon II; 5. Takelot II; 6. Shoshenq III; 7. Pimay; 8. Shoshenq V 9. Osorkon IV −715; Dynasty 23: 1. Pedubast I 818–; 2. Iuput I 3. Shoshenq IV; 4. Osorkon III; 5. Takelot III; 6. Rudamun; 7. Peftjauawybast; 8. Iuput II −715	Dynasty 22: 1. Shoshenq I 945–924; 2. Osorkon I 924–890; 3. Takelot I 890–877; 4. Shoshenq II 877–875; 5. Osorkon II 875–837; 6. Shoshenq III 837–798/5; 7. Shoshenq IIIa 798–785; 8. Pami 785–774; 9. Shoshenq V *774–736; Upper Egyptian line: 1. Horsiese 870–850; 2. Takelot II 841–816; 3. Padibast 830–80/800; 4. Iuput I 816–800; 5. Shoshenq VI 805/0–790; 6. Osorkon III, 790–762; 7. Takelot III, 767–755; 8. Rudamun, 755–735; 9. Ini, 735–730; Dynasty 23: 1. Pedubast II 756–730; 2. Iuput II 756–724; 3. Osorkon IV 730–722; 4. Psammus? 722–712	Dynasty 22: 1. Shoshenq I 943–922; 2. Osorkon II 922–889; 3. Takelot I 889–876; 4. Osorkon III 876–841; 5. Harsiese 873; 6. Shoshenq II *865; 7. Shoshenq III 841–803; 8. Shoshenq V 799–790; 9. Pami 790–782; 10. Shoshenq VI 782–744; Kings in Upper Egypt: 1. Takelot II 845–820; 2. Iuput I 820–809; 3. Osorkon IV 800–773; 4. Takelot III 773–763; 5. Rudamun 763–755; 6. Ini 755–750; Rival line: 1. Pedubast I 834–812; 2. Shoshenq IV 809–806; Dynasty 23 at Memphis: 1. Pedubast II 744–; 2. Osorkon V 3. Pami; (to Dyn. XXIV/XXV?); 4. Gemenefkhonsbak; 5. Pedubast II; Lentopolis: 1. Iuput II; 2. Penamun; 3. Wenamun; (to Dyn. XXVI); Heracleopolis: 1. Peftjauawybast; (to Dyn. XXVI); Hermopolis: 1. Nimlot I 2. Djehutyemhat; (to Dyn. XXV?); 3. Nimlot II; 4. Pedinemty; (to Dyn. XXVI)
Bunson 2002	Hornung 2006	Krauss 2007	Lloyd 2010	
Dynasty 22: 1. Shoshenq I 945–924; 2. Osorkon I 924–909; 3. Takelot I 909–883; 4. Shoshenq II 883; 5. Osorkon II 883–855; 6. Takelot II 860–835; 7. Shoshenq III 835–783; 8. Pami 783–773; 9. Shoshenq V 773–735; 10. Osorkon IV 735–712; Dynasty 23: 1. Pedubast I 828–803; 2. Iuput I 3. Shoshenq IV; 4. Osorkon III 777–749; 5. Takelot III; 6. Rudamun; 7. Iuput II; 8. Nimlot; 9. Peftjauawybast 740–25	Dynasty 22: 1. Shoshenq I 2. Osorkon I 3. Shoshenq (II); 4. Shoshenq (IIb); Shoshenq (IIc); 5. Takelot I 6. Osorkon II; 7. Shoshenq III; 8. Shoshenq IIIb (IV); 9. Pami; 10. Shoshenq V; Dyn. 23 (UE) and rivals: 1. Takelot II; 2. Iuput I 3. Osorkon III; 4. Takelot III; 5. Pedubast I 6. Shoshenq VI; 7. Rudamun; 8. Ini; Lower Egypt: 1. Pedubast I (?) c. 730; 2. Osorkon IV	Dynasty 22: 1. Shoshenq I 943–923; 2. Osorkon I 922–888; 3. Takelot I 887–874; 4. Shoshenq II 873; 5. Osorkon II 872–842; 6. Takelot II 845–821; 7. Shoshenq III 841–789; 8. Pami 790–784; 9. Shoshenq V 783–746	Dynasty 22: 1. Shoshenq I 945–939; 2. Osorkon I 924–889; 3. Shoshenq IIa; 4. Shoshenq IIb; 5. Shoshenq IIIc; 6. Takeloth I 887–874; 7. Osorkon II 874–835; 8. Shoshenq III 835–797; 9. Shoshenq IIIa 797–783; 10. Pimay 783–776; 11. Shoshenq V 776–739	

Graphic list of the various rival dynasties (c. 880–650 BC)

Lower Egypt		Upper Egypt	
Rival lines	Tanis	Thebes	Rival lines
–	Twenty-second Dynasty Takelot I 887–873 BC (?)		–
–	Shoshenq II*; 873–865 BC (?)	Theban 23rd Dyn. Harsiese; 870–860 BC	–
–	Osorkon II; 865–830 BC		–
–	Shoshenq III; 830–791 BC	Takelot II; 834–809 BC	Pedubast I 822–799 BC
–	Shoshenq III; 830–791 BC	Iuput I 809–798 BC	Pedubast I 822–799 BC
–	Shoshenq III; 830–791 BC	Shoshenq III; 798–791 BC	Shoshenq VI; 799–793 BC
–	Shoshenq IV; 791–778 BC	Osorkon III; 791–764 BC	–
–	Pami; 778–769 BC	Osorkon III; 791–764 BC	–
–	Shoshenq V 769–731 BC	Takelot III; 764–756 BC	–
–	Shoshenq V 769–731 BC	Rudamun; 756–750 BC	–
–	Shoshenq V 769–731 BC	Ini; 750–745 BC (?)	Peftjauawybast (Herac.); 750–720 BC
–	Shoshenq V 769–731 BC	Twenty-fifth Dynasty Piye; 743–715 BC	Djehutyemhat (Hermo.); 745–735 BC
–	Shoshenq V 769–731 BC	Twenty-fifth Dynasty Piye; 743–715 BC	Nimlot (Hermo.); 735–725 BC
Iuput II (Leon.); 735–715 BC	Tanite 23rd Dynasty; Pedubast II; 730–725 BC	Twenty-fifth Dynasty Piye; 743–715 BC	Piye; 720–715 BC
Twenty-fourth Dynasty; Tefnakht I (Sais); 726–718 BC	Tanite 23rd Dynasty; Pedubast II; 730–725 BC	Twenty-fifth Dynasty Piye; 743–715 BC	Piye; 720–715 BC
Twenty-fourth Dynasty; Tefnakht I (Sais); 726–718 BC	Osorkon IV; 725–716 BC	Twenty-fifth Dynasty Piye; 743–715 BC	Piye; 720–715 BC
Bakenranef (Sais/Tanis); 718–712 BC		Shebitku; 714–705 BC	
–	Pami II; 712–702 BC	Shabaka; 705–690 BC	
Egypt unified by the Twenty-fifth Dynasty
–	Gemenefkhonsbak, Sekhemkare/Pedubast III (ephemeral rebels)	Taharqa; 690–664 BC	
Necho I (Sais) ?–664 BC	Gemenefkhonsbak, Sekhemkare/Pedubast III (ephemeral rebels)	Taharqa; 690–664 BC	
Psamtik I (Sais); 664–610 BC	–	Tantamani; 664–656 BC	
Egypt unified by the Twenty-sixth Dynasty

=== Twenty-third Dynasty (Libyan) ===
The designation "Twenty-Third Dynasty" is applied variously by scholars to branches of the Twenty-Second Dynasty ruling in mostly Upper Egypt (at least intermittently at Thebes), to various local rulers based at Heracleopolis Magna, Hermopolis, Leontopolis, and to a line of kings who succeeded the Twenty-Second Dynasty at Tanis, all of Libyan origin. The following is the most recent reconstruction by Frédéric Payraudeau (2020). There are roughly 20 kings attested around this period, but this may vary significantly depending on the author (compare the lists given above). See also the discussion of David Aston and Karl Jansen-Winkeln.

(#) – Existence disputed

Rulers of Thebes

#	Image	Personal name	Throne name	Notes	Reign
1		Harsiese A Meryamun	Hedjkheperre Setepenamun	An obscure rival pharaoh at Thebes; sometimes placed in Dynasty XXII. Bunson identifies him as a son of Shoshenq II and an ally of the usurper Pedubast I.	c. 870–860 BC (~20 years)
2		Takelot II; Siese Meryamun	Hedjkheperre Setpenre	Initially thought to have been a son and successor of Osorkon II. Bunson claims that he defeated Harsiese.	c. 834–809 BC (~25 years)
3	–	Iuput I Meryamun	–	Initially thought to be a co-ruler of Pedubast I, most likely the successor of Takelot II.	c. 809–798 BC (~11 years)
Rival Upper Egyptian line
(1)		Meryamun; Pedubast I	Usermaatre Setpenamun	Revolted in Year 11 of Takelot II and briefly took over Thebes between Years 15 and 25. Initially thought to be the first king of the 23rd Dynasty, having previously been High Priest under Takelot II. Records show that he may have ruled with the support of Shoshenq III of the 22nd dynasty.	c. 822–799 BC (~23 years)
(2)	–	Shoshenq VI; Meryamun	Usermaatre Meryamun	Likely a son of Petubast I. An obscure Upper Egyptian king; Hornung calls him Shoshenq IV.	c. 799–793 BC (~5 years)
interruption by rival line, then Shoshenq III of the 22nd Dynasty
4		Osorkon III; Meryamun Saiset	Usermaatre Setpenamun	Son of Takelot II; recovered Thebes, then proclaimed himself king. Manethos' king "Psammous" may be based on his daughter, Shepenupet I, the God's Wife of Amun.	c. 791–764 BC (~27 years)
5		Takelot III; Meryamun Saiset	Usermaatre Setpenamun	Son and co-ruler of Osorkon III, alternatively placed as an obscure ruler of Heracleopolis.	c. 768–756 BC (~12 years)
6		Meryamun; Rudamun	Usermaatre Setpenamun	Son of Osorkon III and brother of Takelot III. Bunson places him in Leontopolis.	c. 756–750 BC (~6 years)
7		Ini III	Menkheperre	An obscure Theban pharaoh who ruled as far as Elephantine. Chronology uncertain; either the successor of Rudamun or a vassal under Piye, the founder of the Kushite 25th Dynasty. Suffered a damnatio memoriae, possibly after the uprising of Tefnakht I.	c. 750–745 BC or 720–715 BC (~5 years)
*		Shoshenq VII; Siese Meryamun	Uasnetjerre Setepenre (?); Hedjkheperre Setepenre (?)	Likely did not exist; probably a corruption of Shoshenq III's name.	

Rulers of Heracleopolis

#	Image	Personal name	Throne name	Notes	Reign
1		Peftjauawybast	Neferkare	Son-in-law of Rudamun. Was defeated by Piye, as depicted in the Stele of Piye, but was allowed to rule as the local governor of Heracleopolis.	c. 750–720 BC (~30 years)

Rulers of Hermopolis

#	Image	Personal name	Throne name	Notes	Reign
1		Djehutyemhat	Neferkheperre Khaikhau	Order uncertain. Originally a vassal of Dynasty XXII in Hermopolis, he proclaimed himself king with the support of the Theban elite.	c. 745–735 BC (~10 years)
2		Nimlot	–	Possibly a son of Osorkon III that proclaimed himself king after his death. Joined the coalition of Tefnakht of Sais. Submitted to Piye, as depicted in the Stele of Piye, and was allowed to rule as the local governor of Hermopolis.	c. 735–720 BC (~15 years)
*	–	Pedinemty	–	Order uncertain. Kitchen suggested that he may have been a successor to Djehutyemhat. Beckerath suggested he ruled at the time of Dynasty XXV at Lycopolis.	c. 700 BC (?)

Rulers of Leontopolis

#	Image	Personal name	Throne name	Notes	Reign
1		Iuput II; Meryamun Saiset	Usermaatre Setepenre	Submitted to Piye, as depicted in the Stele of Piye, and was allowed to rule as the local governor of Leontopolis.	c. 735–715 BC (~20 years)

Rulers of Tanis

This is the line recognized by Manetho as the legitimate successors of the 22nd dynasty.

#	Image	Personal name	Throne name	Notes	Reign
1		Pedubast II	Sehetepibenre	Took the throne after the death of Shoshenq V, the last king of the 22nd dynasty. Manetho calls him Petoubatēs, and records that "in his reign the Olympic festival (776 BC) was first celebrated." He is mentioned in Assyrian records around the reign of Ashurbanipal.	c. 730–725 BC (~5 years)
2		Osorkon IV	Usermaatre	Manetho calls him Osorkhō and records that "the Egyptians called him Heracles". Submitted to Piye, as depicted in the Stele of Piye, and was allowed to rule as the local governor of Tanis.	c. 725–716 BC (~9 years)
interruption by Bakenranef of the 24th Dynasty (?)
3	–	Pami II	Neferkare	Possibly Manetho's Psammous. Precise dating and position uncertain. Rebelled against Shebitku, but was ultimately defeated by Shabaka. Most likely the same as the obscure Tanite king Neferkare.	c. 712–702 BC (~10 years)
interruption by the Kushites of the 25th Dynasty (?)
4		Gemenefkhonsbak	Shepseskare Irenre	May have reigned at Athribis rather than Tanis.	c. 670 BC (?) (uncertain)
5	–	–	Sekhemkare	May or may not be the same person.	c. 670 BC (?) (uncertain)
6	–	Pedubast III	–	May or may not be the same person.	c. 670 BC (?) (uncertain)

Rulers of Terenouthis (date uncertain)

#	Image	Personal name	Throne name	Notes	Reign
1		Penamun	Merytawy[re?]	Unknown placement, known only by his cartouche in Terenouthis. Beckerath suggests he was a local ruler during Dynasty XXV. Kitchen proposes he ruled much later during Dynasty XXVII, or possibly later.	c. 750–650 BC (Beckerath) after 500 BC (Kitchen)

=== Twenty-fourth Dynasty (1st Saite) ===
This was a short-lived dynasty located in the western Delta, at Sais. It was actually a vassal of the 25th dynasty.

Proposed dates: c. 740–712 BC (28 years); c. 736–723 BC (13 years), c. 727–715 BC (12 years). c. 727–713 BC (14 years).

#	Image	Personal name	Throne name	Notes	Reign (Note: Payraudeau gives the reign of Bakenranef as 716–712 BC. However, this does not match the contemporary evidence. One stela records Year 8 of Tefnakht (some authors have argued that the king should be identified as Tefnakht II, but this seems unlikely), and another records Year 6 of Bakenranef, which matches Manetho's figure. Payraudeau follows Anthony Spalinger in dating the end of the Kushite conquest to 712 BC. However, he seemingly dismisses Bakenranef’s stela and assigns him only 4 years. Spalinger gives his reign as 718–712 BC, which implies that Tefnakht began his reign in 726 BC.)
1		Tefnakht I	Shepsesre	Chief of the Ma, a Libyan tribe. Already controlled much of the southwest c. 735 BC. Led a coalition of Egyptian kings (Iuput II of Leontopolis, Peftjauawybast of Heracleopolis, and Nimlot of Hermopolis) to repel the invading Nubians. Was defeated and then became a vassal king under Piye.	c. 726–718 BC (~8 years)
2		Bakenranef	Wahkare	Manetho calls him Bocchoris and assigns him 6 years, while also recording him as the sole member of the dynasty. Likely a brother of Tefnakht, he was defeated in battle by Piye. He was initially allowed to rule in Sais, but Piye's successor, Shebitku, hunted him down and burned him alive.	c. 718–712 BC (~6 years)

=== Twenty-fifth Dynasty (Nubian) ===
Following the collapse of the New Kingdom, the Nubians, a people from modern-day Sudan, founded the Kingdom of Kush. One of its rulers, Piye, invaded Lower Egypt and took the title of pharaoh, although the Nubians already controlled Upper Egypt in the early years of his reign. Kashta, Piye's father, is sometimes also listed as part of the dynasty. The capital during this dynasty was Memphis.

Manetho claims that the 25th Dynasty ruled for 40 years, but this is about half of its actual duration. This dynasty is also mentioned by Herodotus, who records "eighteen Ethiopian kings", and by Diodorus Siculus, who writes that "four Ethiopians held the throne, not consecutively but with intervals between, for a little less than thirty-six years in all."^{:100}^{:44} The accession of Taharqa can be securely dated to 690 BC, marking the first certain year in Egyptian history according to Hornung. Dates follow Payraudeau.

Proposed dates: c. 753–655 BC (98 years), c. 747–656 BC (91 years), c. 746–655 BC (91 years);

#	Image	Personal name	Throne name	Notes	Reign
1		Piye	Usermaatre	Also called Piankhi; likely Manetho's Set recorded at the end of Dynasty XXIII. Son of the Kushite king Kashta; conquered Thebes and defeated the coalition of Egyptian kings led by Tefnakht. Presented himself not as a conqueror, but as a restorer. His dynasty saw a renaissance of Egyptian arts, and its rulers revived the old tradition of pyramid building (see Nubian pyramids).	c. 743–713 BC (~30 years)
2		Shebitku	Djedkaure	Believed to be Shabaka's successor until the 2010s. Likely Herodotus' Sethos. Fought the Assyrian king Sennacherib with the aid of the Palestinians and Phoenicians.	c. 713–705 BC (~8 years)
3		Shabaka	Neferkare	Believed to be Shebiktu's predecessor until the 2010s. Commissioned the Shabaka Stone.	c. 705–690 BC (~15 years)
4		Taharqa	Nefertemkhure	Son of Piye; fought and eventually lost to the Assyrian king Esarhaddon, who took and sacked Memphis. Taharqa fled to the south and failed to regain Memphis from Ashurbanipal, Esarhaddon's successor. Retired to Nubia shortly before his own death.	690–664 BC (26 years)
5		Tantamani	Bakare	Nephew and co-ruler of Taharqa. Recovered Thebes, Aswan, and Memphis, but was defeated again by the Assyrians. Thebes was looted, and he retired to Nubia. Not recorded by Manetho.	664–656 BC (8 years)

=== Proto-Saite Dynasty ===
While modern scholars recognize Psamtik I as the founder of the 26th Dynasty, Manetho records four kings before him. They likely correspond to local rulers and Nubian/Assyrian vassals.

(#) – Status ambiguous

#	Image	Personal name	Throne name	Notes	Reign
(1)	–	Ammeris "the Nubian"	–	Included by Eusebius but not by Africanus.	12 years (?)
(2)		Tefnakht II	Menibre? Iribre?	Perhaps relatives of Bakenranef and Tefnakht, possibly attested in scarab seals.	7 years
(3)	–	Nekauba	–	Perhaps relatives of Bakenranef and Tefnakht, possibly attested in scarab seals.	16 years
(4)		Necho I Nechaos	Menkheperre	Was killed by an invading Kushite force under Tantamani. Father of Psamtik I.	8 years

== Late period (664–332 BC) ==
The Twenty-fifth Dynasty ended after the Assyrian conquest of Egypt. In 671 BC, Memphis, the capital of the first dynasties, was plundered by Esarhaddon, and the sack of Thebes followed a few years later. Despite this, a new dynasty, the Twenty-sixth, managed to restore Egypt's influence in the region and repelled the Assyrians and Babylonians. Still, they all eventually fell to the Achaemenid Persians, who became the Twenty-seventh Dynasty in 525 BC. Persian rule was interrupted by three short-lived dynasties (the 28th, 29th, and 30th) ruling for six decades, between 404 and 342 BC. The first one was founded by Amyrtaeus, and the last one ended with Nectanebo II, the last native ruler of Egypt until the 20th century.

The chronology starting from Taharqa, the penultimate Nubian king, can be fixed thanks to the Canon of Kings of Ptolemy, which is itself based on ancient Babylonian sources and fits perfectly with Manetho's reign lengths. The only period with disputed chronology is the restored native Egyptian rule between the 27th and 31st Dynasties; all other dates are fixed.

=== Twenty-sixth Dynasty (Saite) ===
The 26th Dynasty was the last great native Egyptian dynasty and ruled from 664 to 525 BC. Many of these pharaohs are better known by their Hellenized names; native Egyptian names are given in small italics.

#	Image	Personal name	Throne name	Notes	Reign
1		Psamtik I	Wahibre	One of the longest-reigning pharaohs; also known as Psammetichus. Son of Necho I, reunified Egypt by his 9th year with the assistance of the Assyrians and Greek mercenaries. He aided the Assyrians during their war against the Babylonians and Medes, although this did not stop the Fall of Nineveh in 612 BC.	664–610 BC (54 years)
2		Necho II	Wehemibre	His campaigns in Jerusalem are recorded in the Books of Kings of the Bible. Refurbished the Egyptian navy with Greek mercenaries and sent a fleet to circumnavigate Africa. His Canal of the Pharaohs pre-empted the Suez Canal by 2500 years.	610–595 BC (15 years)
3		Psamtik II	Neferibre	Conducted several military campaigns, especially in Nubia.	May/December 595–9 February 589 BC (6 years, 1–5 months) (Note: The reign of Necho II began sometime between 23 January and 19 November 610 BC and ended sometime between 4 May 595 BC and 19 January 594 BC. His successor Psamtik I died on Month 1 Day 23 of his Year 7, which equals 9 February 589 BC.)
4		Apries; Wahibre	Haaibre	Called Apries by Herodotus and Ouaphris by Manetho. Continued to assert Egyptian influence in the Near East, involving Egypt in the affairs of the Babylonians, Libyans, and Greeks. He was overthrown and killed after a mutiny of dissatisfied troops.	10 February 589–c. November 570 BC (19 years, ~10 months)
5		Amasis II; Ahmose II Netsa	Khnemibre	Better known by his Greek name Amasis, nicknamed "Philhellene", meaning "he who loves the Greeks". Usurped the throne with a military coup, but was later remembered as a great ruler.	c. July 570–c. January 526 BC (Note: The earliest document of Ahmose II is dated to July 570 BC. Cambyses was declared pharaoh on or shortly before August 525 BC (outdated sources dated his first document to 29 May 525 BC) and died shortly after 1 July 522 BC.) (44 years, ~6 months)
6		Psamtik III	Ankhkaenre	Son of Amasis; was defeated and captured by the Persians. He was initially allowed to live in Susa, the Persian capital, but was later accused of treachery and executed. Documents dated to his reign may belong to the rebel Psammetichus IV instead.	c. January 526–c. July 525 BC (6 months)

=== Twenty-seventh Dynasty (Achaemenid) ===
The first Persian domination lasted from 525 to 404 BC.

(#) – Regent
(#) – Rebel

#	Image	Personal name	Throne name	Notes	Reign
1		Cambyses; Kembud	Mesutre	Son of Cyrus the Great, founder of the Achaemenid Empire. Reigned from December 530 BC and conquered Egypt after defeating Psamtik III at the Battle of Pelusium. Described as a tyrant in both Egyptian and Greek sources. Died in uncertain circumstances while traveling to crush a rebellion in Syria.	c. August 525–July 522 BC (2 years, 11 months)
2		Bardiya (Note: The nomen is not attested in hieroglyphs.)	–	Also called "Gaumata the Magi" (priest), claimed by Darius I to be an usurper who impersonated the son of Cyrus the Great. Revolted on 11 March 522 BC and briefly took the throne from Cambyses. Not included in most modern king lists. (Note: Babylonian documents confirm the brief rule of Bardiya, but he does not appear in any Egyptian records. However, it's still possible that news of Bardiya's accession reached Egypt at some point. For instance, the reign of emperors Gordian I and Gordian II lasted only 20 days. Still, news of their accession managed to travel from Rome to Alexandria in time to be included in official documents for roughly one month (such travel took around 25 days by ship).)	c. July–29 September 522 BC (2 months)
3		Darius I "the Great"; Deriush	Setutre	Alleged son of Cambyses, took the throne after killing his rivals. Died in October 486, at the age of 64, while traveling to put down an Egyptian revolt.	29 September 522– October 486 BC (36 years, 1 month)
4		Xerxes I "the Great"; Kheshyresh	–	Son of Darius I, never visited Egypt personally. Put down rebellions in both Egypt and Persia. Was murdered by Artabanus.	October 486– August 465 BC (20 years, 10 months)
*	–	Artabanus	–	Recorded by ancient chronographers as an ephemeral king who ruled for 7 months, but was actually only the power behind the throne. Not included in any of the modern king lists.	465 BC (7 months, as regent)
5		Artaxerxes I Artekhshesesh	–	Son of Xerxes, killed Artabanus in hand-to-hand combat. Faced massive rebellions in Egypt.	August 465– c. December 424 BC (41 years, ~2 months)
6		Xerxes II; Kheshyresh	–	Ruled 2 months according to Manetho, more precisely, 45 days around December 425 BC. The second-shortest-reigning pharaohs, only behind the 18 days of Ptolemy XI Alexander II.	c. December 424– c. January 423 BC (45 days)
7		Sogdianus	–	Ruled 7 months according to Manetho, but in reality only one month at most.	c. January–February; 423 BC (~1 month)
8		Darius II (Ochus); Deriush	–	Son of Artaxerxes I, usurped the throne from the rightful heir and fought against the Persian aristocracy to maintain control. The Egyptians successfully revolted after his death.	February 423– March 404 BC (19 years, ~1 month)

==== Native rebels ====
#	Image	Personal name	Throne name	Notes	Reign
*		Pedubast IV	Seheruibre	Also called Petubastis III. A native Egyptian rebel in the Delta.	c. 522–520 BC (2 years)
*	–	Psammetichus IV	Ahmose (?); Nebkaenre (?)	A proposed native Egyptian rebel leader. Exact dates unknown.	c. 480s BC
*		Inaros II (Note: Enumerated after the Libyan prince Inaros of Athribis, who rebelled against the Assyrians about two centuries earlier.)	–	Possibly a prince of Heliopolis, grandson of Psamtik III, and son of Psamtik IV. Rebelled against Artaxerxes I and took control over modern Alexandria. Was defeated by Megabyzus and crucified in Persia.	c. 454 BC

=== Twenty-eighth Dynasty ===
The Twenty-eighth Dynasty lasted roughly 6 years and consisted of a single pharaoh:

#	Image	Personal name	Notes	Reign
1		Amyrtaeus; Amenirdisu	Proclaimed himself pharaoh on the death of Darius II and established himself in Sais. Was defeated and executed by Nepherites.	c. 404–399 BC (5–6 years)

=== Twenty-ninth Dynasty ===
The Twenty-ninth Dynasty ruled from 399/8 to 380 BC:

(#) – Existence disputed

#	Image	Personal name	Throne name	Notes	Reign
1		Nepherites I Nefaarud	Baenre Merynetjeru	Established himself at Mendes, captured Amyrtaeus and executed him at Memphis.	c. 399–393 BC (5–6 years)
2		Hakor	Khnemmaatre Setepenkhnemu	Lineage and position uncertain. Probably the original heir and successor of Nepherites I.	c. 393–380 BC (12–13 years)
3		Psammuthes; Pasherienmut	Userre Setepenptah	Briefly usurped the throne from the rightful heir. Manetho claims he ruled 1 year.	c. 393 BC (1 year or less)
4	–	Nepherites II; Nefaarud	–	Son of Hakor, only ruled for 4 months before being overthrown by Nectanebo I.	c. 380 BC (4 months)
*	–	Muthis	–	Only listed in the Aegyptiaca; most likely a mistake by Manetho or his scribes. Alternatively, another claimant to the throne during the reign of Hakor.	"1 year"

=== Thirtieth Dynasty ===
The Thirtieth Dynasty was the last native Egyptian dynasty and lasted from c. 380 to 342 BC.

#	Image	Personal name	Throne name	Notes	Reign (Note: The date of the end of the Thirtieth Dynasty is universally given as 343/342 BC (late 343 to early 342). Leo Depuydt proposed 340/339 BC as a new date for the second Persian conquest. The summation of Manetho's reigns for the 28th to 30th Dynasties, assuming they are all correct, amounts to 64 years, which closely matches the 65 years between 404 BC and 339 BC. However, Depuydt's rearrangement has not been widely adopted. Damien Agut-Labordère has labeled it as "not convincing", while Payraudeau has also favoured 342 BC.)
1		Nectanebo I Nakhtnebef	Kheperkare	Seized power in Sebennytos. Managed to stop a Persian invasion of the Nile.	c. 380–362 BC (17–18 years)
2		Teos; Djedhor Setep-en-Anhur	Irimaatenre	Son and brief co-ruler of Nectanebo I; was forced to abdicate as part of a general uproar against his heavy tax policies.	c. 362–360 BC (1–2 years)
3		Nectanebo II; Nakhthorhebyt Merihathor	Snedjemibre Setepenanhur	Last native ruler of Egypt until the Egyptian revolution of 1952; usurped the throne from his uncle. Managed to repel the Persians for a time, but was ultimately defeated at the Battle of Pelusium, escaping to Nubia before disappearing. Later stories portrayed him as the secret father of Alexander the Great.	c. 360–342 BC (17–18 years)

=== Thirty-first Dynasty (2nd Achaemenid) ===
The second Persian domination lasted from 342 to 332 BC.

(#) – Rebel

#	Image	Personal name	Throne name	Notes	Reign
1		Artaxerxes III (Ochus); Artekhshesesh	–	Son of Artaxerxes II and grandson of Darius II, invaded Egypt in 351 BC. Described as a cruel tyrant by ancient sources; he was poisoned with his sons by a court official.	c. 342–338 BC (3–4 years)
2		Artaxerxes IV (Arses); Artekhshesesh	–	Youngest son of Artaxerxes III, survived the conspiracy of Bagoas. Tried to poison the eunuch, but was murdered with his family.	338–336 BC (2 years)
3		Darius III (Codoman); Deriush	–	Cousin of Arses, took the throne after forcing Bagoas to drink his own poison. Faced the invading forces of Alexander III of Macedon and was defeated at the Battles of Issus and then Gaugamela. Was ultimately murdered by his own men.	336–332 BC (4 years)

==== Native rebels ====
#	Image	Personal name	Throne name	Notes	Reign
*		Khabash	Senensetepuniptah	Led a revolt against the Persians around 338 BC; later remembered as a national hero.	c. 338 BC (briefly)

== Hellenistic period (332–30 BC) ==
The Macedonian Greeks under Alexander the Great ushered in the Hellenistic period with his conquest of Persia and Egypt in 332 BC, creating one of the largest empires in history. However, this empire quickly fragmented after his sudden death in 323 BC, which led to the chaotic Wars of the Diadochi. Ptolemy, one of Alexander's generals, claimed the pharaonic titles and established the Ptolemaic Kingdom, the last and longest-reigning dynasty of Egypt. The former Persian territories were absorbed into the Hellenic Seleucid Empire, which bordered Egypt to the East. Both states would eventually fall to the Roman Republic over the course of the 1st century BC.

=== Thirty-second Dynasty (Argead) ===
The Argeads ruled Egypt from 332 to c. 304 BC. Like their predecessors, the Hellenistic rulers used the Sa-Ra title (nomen) to display their Egyptized personal names.

#	Image	Personal name	Throne name	Notes	Reign
1		Alexander III "the Great"; Aluksindres	Setepenre Meryamun	Succeeded his father Philip II of Macedon in 336 BC, at the age of 20. Conquered most of the known world at the time; he was received in Egypt as a liberator. Founded the city of Alexandria, the new capital and the first of many with his name. Died suddenly in Babylon, allegedly from a fever. Ptolemy I Soter buried him in Alexandria, although his tomb has not been found.	November 332–11 June 323 BC (Note: The Siege of Gaza, at Egypt's eastern frontier, took place in October 332 BC, after which Alexander spent several months in Egypt. His coronation therefore cannot have occurred earlier than November. Notably, this timing would have aligned his accession with the Egyptian New Year, which fell on 14 November in 332 BC. His death certainly took place on 11 June 323 BC.) (8 years, 7 months)
2		Philip III Arrhidaeus; Pelupuisa	Setepenre Meryamun	Half-brother of Alexander, murdered by Olympias, the queen mother.	323–317 BC (6 years)
3		Alexander IV; Aluksindres	Haaibre Setepenamun	Posthumous child of Alexander; murdered with his mother by General Cassander.	317–c. 304 BC (Note: Some scholars have argued that he was killed around 310 BC, but continued to be posthumously recognized as king. He was probably killed in 305/304, around the same time that Ptolemy claimed the title of king.) (12 years)

=== Thirty-third Dynasty (Ptolemaic) ===
The second Hellenistic dynasty, the Ptolemaic, ruled Egypt for nearly 275 years, from 305/4 BC to 30 BC. It was the longest-reigning dynasty of Egypt, followed closely by the Eighteenth. The most famous member of this dynasty was Cleopatra VII, better known simply as Cleopatra, who was successively the lover of Julius Caesar and, after his death, of Mark Antony, having children with both of them. She strove to create a dynastic and political union with Rome, but the assassination of Caesar and the defeat of Antony doomed their plans. Egypt was ultimately conquered by the Romans under Octavian, who would become the Roman emperor Augustus. All members of the Ptolemaic dynasty shared the same names, but adopted one or several Greek epithets on accession. Regnal numbers are only a modern convention.

(#) – Minor co-regent
(#) – Status ambiguous
(#) – Rebel

#	Image	Personal name	Throne name	Notes	Reign
1		Ptolemy I Soter; Ptolemis	Setepenre Meryamun	Friend and companion of Alexander, ruled as satrap after his death and proclaimed himself king in the midst of the Wars of the Diadochi. Stole Alexander's body and buried him in Alexandria, claiming to follow his last will. Commissioned the Lighthouse of Alexandria, one of the Seven Wonders, and the Library of Alexandria. Died aged around 85.	304–282 BC (Note: The exact chronology of Ptolemy's coronation is problematic, but it most likely took place between November 305 and July 304, possibly c. June. Regnal years during the Late dynastic period were all antedated so that a king's accession always coincided with the New Year; as such, Ptolemy's reign officially began on 7 November 305 BC. His death has been dated to January 282, although April/June is also possible. Various Greek authors write that he abdicated c. 285 BC, but this is uncertain and often disregarded by modern scholars.) (22 years)
2		Ptolemy II Philadelphus; Ptolemis	Userkare Meryamun	Son of Ptolemy I Soter and Berenice I, named co-ruler in 284. Initially married to Arsinoe I, named Philadelphus ("sibling-loving") after marrying his own sister, Arsinoe II. Completed his father's projects in Alexandria. Died at the age of 62.	c. 28 February 284– 28 January 246 BC (37 years, ~11 months)
*		Arsinoe II Philadelphos♀ Arsinat	Khnemet Ibenmaat Meret Netjeru	Sister-wife of Ptolemy II Philadelphus. She was given pharaonic titles (possibly posthumous), but was not recorded as sovereign by Hellenistic administration of the country.	c. 273/2–July 270/68 BC
3	–	Ptolemy Epigonos	–	Co-ruler of Ptolemy II Philadelphus; demoted after revolting with Timarchus of Miletus. Possibly a son of Arsinoe II, was allowed to rule Telmessos and died aged 60.	c. 267–259 BC (8 years, under Ptolemy II)
4		Ptolemy III Euergetes; Ptolemis Ankhdjet Meryptah	Iwaensenwy Netjerwy Setepenre Sekhemankhenamun	Son of Ptolemy II Philadelphus and Arsinoe I; expanded Ptolemaic power and campaigned as far as Babylon, at the hearth of the Seleucid Empire.	28 January 246–c. December 222 BC (23 years, ~11 months)
*		Berenice II Euergetis♀ Bereniket Netjeret Menkhet Meret Netjerut	–	Wife of Ptolemy III Euergetes, female vizier, and Queen regnant of Cyrene. She is attested to have pharaonic titles, but was not recorded as sovereign by Hellenistic administration of the country. Served for 5 years as regent of Ptolemy IV Philopator, who poisoned her.	c. 246–221 BC
5		Ptolemy IV Philopator; Ptolemis Ankhdjet Meryptah	Iwaennetjerwymenekhwy Setepenptah Userkare Sekhemankhamun	Son of Ptolemy III Euergetes and Berenice II. Effective power was held by Sosibius and Agathocles, who manipulated him into poisoning his own mother and brother. Faced the massive revolt of Horwennefer in 205 BC. Died at the age of 44 after a life of excesses.	c. December 222–July 204 BC (17 years, 8 months)
*		Arsinoe III Thea Philopator♀ Arsinat	–	Sister-wife of Ptolemy IV Philopator. She was given the title of "female ruler", but was not recorded as sovereign by Hellenistic administration of the country. Murdered at the instigation of Sosibius.	c. 220–204 BC
6		Ptolemy V Epiphanes Eucharistus; Ptolemis Ankhdjet Meryptah	Iwaennetjerwymerwyit Setepenptah Userkare Sekhemankhamun	Son of Ptolemy IV Philopator and Arsinoe III, born and named co-ruler in 210 BC. Succeeded in August 204 and ruled under successive regencies until November 197 BC.	November 210– September 180 BC (29 years, 10 months)
*		Cleopatra I Thea Epiphanes Syra♀ Qleopadrat	–	Wife of Ptolemy V Epiphanes, regent of her son Ptolemy VI Philometor during his minority, and female vizier. She was given pharaonic titles, but was not recorded in Hellenistic administration of country as sovereign, until the reign of her son, when her exact status is disputed.	c. 193–177 BC
7		Ptolemy VI Philometor; Ptolemis Ankhdjet Meryptah	Iwaennetjerwyperu Setepenptahkheperi Irymaatamunre	Son of Ptolemy V Epiphanes and Cleopatra I Syra. Succeeded at age 6 and ruled under the regency of his mother until October 177 BC, but was only declared of age in about January 169 BC. Was briefly deposed by Ptolemy VIII Physcon in late 164 BC, but was quickly restored with Roman aid. Died after falling from his horse.	September 180– November 164 BC (1st reign: 16 years, 2 months) 163–c. July 145 BC (2nd reign: 18 years)
*		Ptolemy VII Neos Philopator	Panetjerhunu Meryetef	Also known as Ptolemy Memphites. Formerly thought to have been a short-lived co-ruler, possibly a son of Ptolemy VIII Physcon and Cleopatra II. Posthumously added to the cult of the deified royals.	never reigned
8		Ptolemy VIII Euergetes II Tryphon "Physcon"; Ptolemis Ankhdjet Meryptah	Iwaennetjerwyperwy Setepenptah Irymaatre Sekhemankhenamun	Brother of Ptolemy VI Philometor, declared co-ruler in 170 BC alongside Cleopatra II. Nicknamed "the Fat" (Physcon); his reign was plagued by court intrigue. Expelled his co-rulers c. November 164, but was himself deposed a few months later. Restored in 145–130 and again in 127–116. Died on 28 June 116 BC, aged nearly 70.	5 October 170–163 BC (1st reign: 13 years) 145–130 BC (2nd reign: 15 years) 127–28 June 116 BC (3rd reign: 11 years)
9	–	Ptolemy Eupator	–	Child of Ptolemy VI Philometor, died shortly after being named co-ruler.	c. March–July 152 BC (~4 months)
10		Cleopatra II Philometor Soteira♀ Qleopadrat	–	First confirmed queen regnant of the dynasty. Sister-wife of Ptolemy VI Philometor, then wife of Ptolemy VIII Physcon, who briefly deposed her in late 164 BC. They reconciled in 145 BC, on the death of Ptolemy VI Philometor, but in 131 BC she deposed him and became sole ruler. She was deposed in 127 BC, but returned in early 124 BC. Then co-ruled alongside Cleopatra III, Ptolemy VIII Physcon, and briefly Ptolemy IX Soter until 116 BC. Had one of the longest reigns. (Note: The sum of Cleopatra II's reigns amounts to 58 years, the longest reign alongside Pepi II Neferkare (64) and Ramesses II (66), as well as one of the longest-reigning monarchs in history.)	5 October 170–164 BC (1st reign: 14 years) 163–127 BC (2nd reign: 36 years) 124–116 BC (3rd reign: 8 years)
11		Cleopatra III Euergetis (Note: Also called Cleopatra Philometor Soteira when associated with her son Ptolemy IX Soter.)♀ Qleopadrat	–	Daughter of Ptolemy VI Philometor and Cleopatra II, married her uncle-stepfather Ptolemy VIII Physcon. Declared co-ruler in 142/140 BC. Was exiled in 130 BC, but returned in 127 BC and became regent for her son Ptolemy IX Soter in 116 BC. In 107 BC, she deposed him in favour of another son, Ptolemy X Alexander I. Was killed during the ensuing civil war by Ptolemy X Alexander I.	c. 140–130 BC (1st reign: ~10 years) 127–c. September 101 BC (2nd reign: ~26 years)
12		Ptolemy IX Soter II "Lathyros"; Ptolemis Ankhdjet Meryptah	Iwaennetjermenekhnetjeret Meretmutesnedjetet Setepenptah Irimaatre Sekhemankhamun	Son of Ptolemy VIII Physcon and Cleopatra III; nicknamed "chickpea" (Lathyros). Was exiled in 107 BC, but retook the throne on the death of Ptolemy X Alexander I.	28 June 116–c. October 107 BC (1st reign: 9 years, 3 months) c. November 88– c. December 81 BC (2nd reign: 7 years, ~1 month)
13		Ptolemy X Alexander I Ptolemis Aleksentres	Iwaennetjermenekhenetjeret Menkhetre Setepenptah Irimaatre Senenankhenamun	Son of Ptolemy VIII Physcon and Cleopatra III. Became senior ruler in 101 BC, after the death of Cleopatra III, alongside Berenice III. Was expelled from Alexandria by Ptolemy IX Soter, dying at sea while attempting to escape to Cyprus.	September 107–c. May 88 BC (18 years, ~8 months)
14		Berenice III♀ Irypatet Werethesut Birniket	–	Daughter of Ptolemy IX Soter. Named co-ruler with her uncle-husband Ptolemy X Alexander I. Was expelled in 88 BC, but was allowed to return in 81 BC as co-ruler of her father. Briefly ruled as sole monarch for 4 months in 80 BC before being killed by Ptolemy XI Alexander II.	October 101–c. May 88 BC (1st reign: 12 years, ~7 months) c. July 81–c. April 80 BC (2nd reign: ~9 months)
15		Ptolemy XI Alexander II; Ptolemis Aleksentres	–	The shortest-reigning pharaoh. Son of Ptolemy X Alexander I and supposedly Cleopatra Selene, installed as king with the support of the Roman dictator Sulla. Was killed on his 19th day by an Alexandrian mob after murdering his wife Berenice III.	c. April 80 BC (18 days)
16		Ptolemy XII Neos Dionysus "Auletes"; Ptolemis Ankhdjet Meryptahset	Iwa'enpanetjernehem Setepenptah Irimaatenre Sekhemankhamun	Son of Ptolemy IX Soter and a concubine (possibly Cleopatra IV); nicknamed "the Flautist" (Auletes). Deposed by Cleopatra VI and Berenice IV after an unpopular reign; later restored with the help of the Roman general Pompey. Left his official will in Rome.	c. April 80–c. June 58 BC (1st reign: 22 years, ~2 months) c. February 55–c. March 51 BC (2nd reign: 4 years, ~1 month)
17		Cleopatra V Tryphaena♀ Qleopadrat	–	Daughter of Ptolemy IX Soter or Ptolemy X Alexander I, wife of Ptolemy XII Auletes, and mother of Berenice IV. Theorised to be the same person as Cleopatra VI; co-ruled with Ptolemy XII Auletes until her death or removal in 69 BC	c. April 80–c. October 69 BC (11 years, ~6 months)
18	–	Cleopatra VI Tryphaena II♀ Qleopadrat	–	Co-ruler with Berenice IV. Recorded by Porphyry of Tyre to be Berenice's sister, but most likely identical instead with her mother, Cleopatra V.	c. June 58–c. August 57 BC (1 year, ~2 months)
19	–	Berenice IV Epiphaneia♀ Bereniket	–	Daughter of Ptolemy XII Auletes and Cleopatra V (VI). Proclaimed co-ruler in 58 BC; deposed and executed on the return of her father.	c. June 58–c. February 55 BC (2 years, ~8 months)
*	–	Seleucus Kybiosactes	–	The first husband of Berenice IV. Called her co-ruler by Eusebius. Died a week after the wedding, as a result of murder or illness.	c. 57/56 BC (1 week)
*	–	Archelaus		The second husband of Berenice IV. He was called her co-ruler by Strabo and Eusebius, but there is no surviving evidence of this in the administrative records from the period. Died in battle.	c. 56 – January/February 55 BC (~6 months)
20		Cleopatra VII Thea Philopator♀ Qleopadrat Netjeret Meret ites	–	De facto last pharaoh. Daughter of Ptolemy XII Auletes, she succeeded him aged 18 and ruled as senior pharaoh with her brothers and eldest son. In 48 BC she fought and defeated her sister Arsinoe IV with the support of Roman dictator Julius Caesar, who fathered her first-born son and heir (Caesarion). After Caesar's assassination in 44 BC, she allied with and married Mark Antony during the wars of the Second Triumvirate. Their actions led Octavian, Caesar's heir, to declare war in 32 BC; both were defeated and they are believed to have committed suicide in August 30 BC.	c. March 51– 12 August 30 BC (Note: Most authors date Claeopatra's accession to 51 BC. Some authors have proposed a brief co-regency with her father in 52 BC, but the evidence isn't conclusive. Her reign was technically interrupted by a few months during 48 BC. Cleopatra almost certainly died on the 17th day of the Egyptian month Mesori, which corresponds to 10 August in the older Roman calendar, and 12 August in the Julian calendar.) (21 years, ~5 months)
21		Ptolemy XIII Theos Philopator; Ptolemis	–	Brother-husband of Cleopatra; joined Arsinoe IV in her war against Cleopatra and Caesar. Died in a failed attempt to ambush Caesar, aged 14–15.	c. March 51–13 January 47 BC (3 years and some months)
*	–	Arsinoe IV♀ Arsinat	–	Sister of Cleopatra; rebelled with the help of Ganymedes and then took Alexandria for a few months. Was betrayed, sent to Rome, and later executed by Mark Antony.	c. September 48– 13 January 47 BC (4 months)
22		Ptolemy XIV Philopator; Ptolemis	–	Brother-husband and nominal co-ruler with Cleopatra. Died at the age of 15–16, allegedly poisoned by his sister-wife.	January 47–c. August 44 BC (3 years, ~7 months)
23		Ptolemy XV Caesar "Caesarion"; Ptolemis Kyseres	Iwapanetjernetynehem Setepenptah Irmaatre Sekhemankhenamun	Son of Cleopatra and Julius Caesar, crowned co-ruler at the age of 3, better known as Caesarion ("little Cesar"). Nominally the last pharaoh; became sole ruler after Cleopatra's death, but was executed by Octavian after the fall of Alexandria.	2 September 44–August 30 BC (13 years, 11 months)

==== Native rebels ====
#	Personal name	Notes	Reign
*	Horwennefer	Rebel pharaoh in the South (Upper Egypt) against Ptolemy IV Philopator, with capital at Thebes.	November 205–c. September 199 BC (5 years, ~10 months)
*	Ankhwennefer	Successor (or possibly an alternate regnal name) of Horwennefer in Thebes, Upper Egypt. Took advantage of the invasion of Antiochus III the Great in Egypt's Eastern provinces. Captured and later executed by Ptolemy V Epiphanes.	c. September 199–27 August 186 BC (12 years, ~11 months)
*	Harsiesi; Sausir	Rebel pharaoh in the South (Upper Egypt) against Ptolemy VIII Physcon; took Thebes for a couple of months but was expelled and defeated in the following year.	c. September 131–c. September 130 BC (1 year)

== Roman period ==
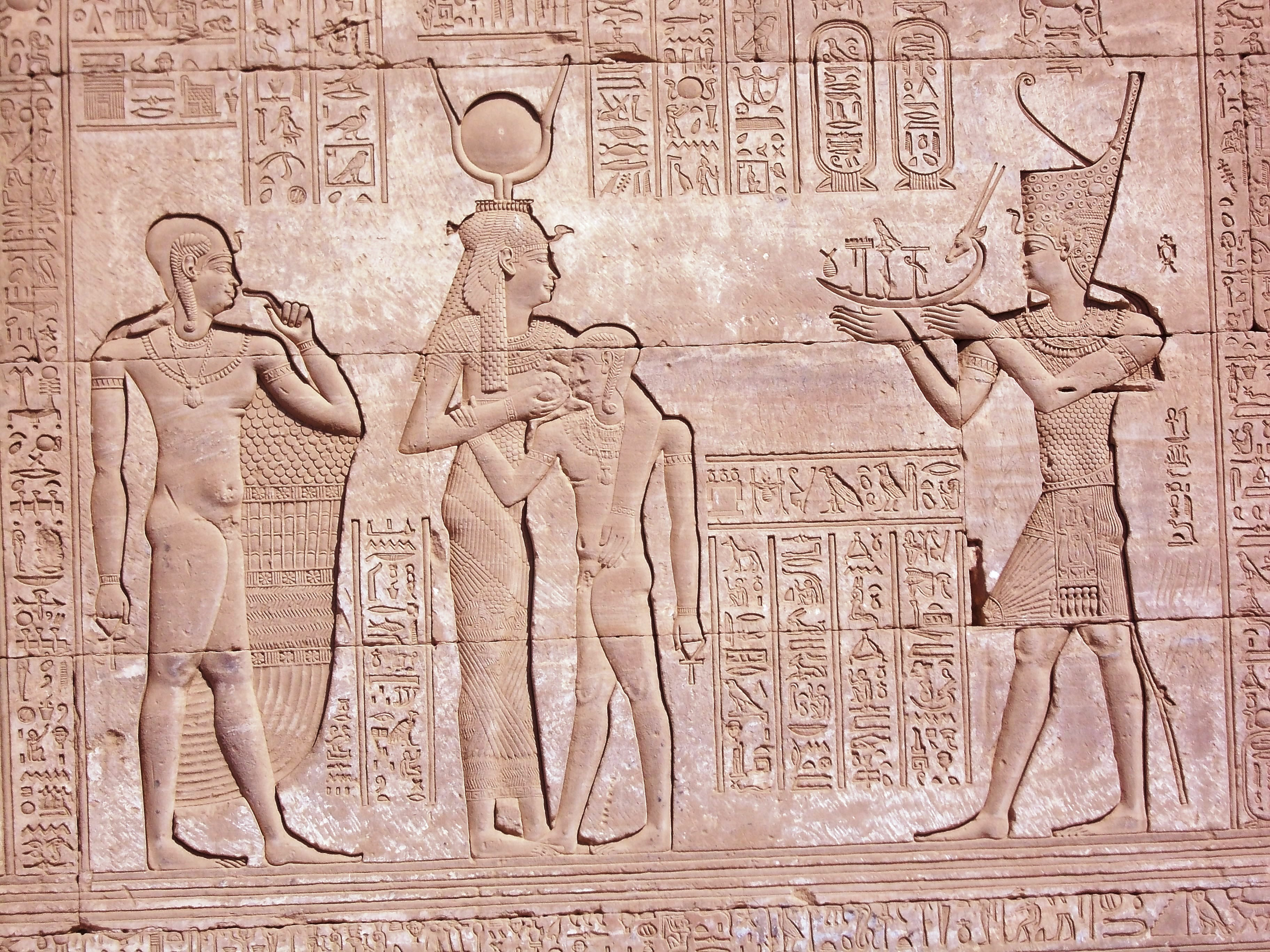
Egyptian relief depicting the Roman emperor Trajan (right, r. 98–117 AD) in full pharaonic style.

Egypt became a client kingdom of Rome in the reign of Ptolemy X Alexander I (r. 107–88 BC) but it was not until the death of Cleopatra (and defeat of Mark Antony) in 30 BC, that Egypt became a Roman province. The Roman emperors were accorded the title of pharaoh by the Egyptians, but the title was not acknowledged outside the province. The last Roman emperor known from a pharaonic titulary is Maximinus Daza (r. 310–313 AD). Royal cartouches are attested as late as 340 AD, but the pagan Egyptians chose to posthumously use cartouches of Diocletian (r. 284–305 AD) rather than acknowledging the later Christian emperors. This was around the same time that the knowledge and understanding of hieroglyphs began to be forgotten; the last known inscription of its kind, known as the Graffito of Esmet-Akhom, dates to the year 394.

Roman rule in Egypt continued almost uninterrupted until the 7th century, when the province fell to the Arab conquest, whereafter Egypt was ruled by the successive caliphates.

== See also ==
- List of ancient Egyptian royal consorts
- Dynasties of ancient Egypt
- Lists of rulers of Egypt
- History of Egypt
- Egyptian chronology
- List of monarchs of Kush
- Pharaohs in the Bible

== Bibliography ==
- Beckerath, Jürgen von (1999). Handbuch der ägyptischen Königsnamen (in German). P. von Zabern. ISBN 978-3-8053-2591-2.
- Beckerath, Jürgen von (1997). Chronologie des pharaonischen Ägypten: die Zeitbestimmung der ägyptischen Geschichte von der Vorzeit bis 332 v. Chr (in German). Verlag Philipp von Zabern. ISBN 978-3-8053-2310-9.
- Baker, Darrel D. (2008). The Encyclopedia of the Pharaohs: Volume I - Predynastic to the Twentieth Dynasty 3300–1069 BC. London: Stacey International. ISBN 978-1-905299-37-9.
- Bunson, Margaret R. (2002) [1991]. Encyclopedia of Ancient Egypt. Facts on File. ISBN 0-8160-8216-2.
- Cooney, Kara (2018). When Women Ruled the World: Six Queens of Egypt. National Geographic. ISBN 978-1-4262-1977-1.
- Clayton, Peter A. (2001) [1995]. Chronicle of the Pharaohs: The Reign-by-Reign Record of the Rulers and Dynasties of Ancient Egypt. London: Thames and Hudson. ISBN 978-0-500-05074-3.
- Dandamaev, M. A. (1989). A Political History of the Achaemenid Empire. BRILL. ISBN 978-90-04-66763-1.
- Dodson, Aidan; Hilton, Dyan (2004). The Complete Royal Families of Ancient Egypt. Thames & Hudson. ISBN 0-500-05128-3.
- Hayes, William C. (2007) [1970]. "Chapter VI. Chronology". In Edwards, I.E.S.; Gadd, C.J. (eds.). The Cambridge Ancient History. Vol. 1, part 1. Cambridge University Press. pp. 173–193.
- Helck, Wolfgang (1987). Untersuchungen zur Thinitenzeit (in German). Otto Harrassowitz Verlag. ISBN 978-3-447-02677-2.
- Helck, Wolfgang (1956). Untersuchungen zu Manetho und den ägyptischen Königslisten (in German). Walter de Gruyter GmbH & Co KG.
- Hornung, E.; Krauss, R.; Warburton, D. A., eds. (2006). Ancient Egyptian Chronology. Leiden: BRILL. ISBN 978-90-04-11385-5.
- Krauss, Rolf (2007). "Egyptian Chronology for Dynasties XIII to XXV" (PDF). In Bietak, Manfred (ed.). The Synchronisation of Civilisations in the Eastern Mediterranean in the Second Millennium B.C. III. ÖAW. pp. 173–190.
- Kitchen, K. A. (2009) [1972]. The third intermediate period in Egypt, 1100-650 B.C. Aris & Phillips. ISBN 978-0-85668-768-6. OCLC 297803817.
- Leprohon, Ronald J. (2013). The Great Name: Ancient Egyptian Royal Titulary. Writings from the ancient world, no. 33. Atlanta: Society of Biblical Literature. ISBN 978-1-58983-736-2.
- Lloyd, Alan B., ed. (2010). A companion to Ancient Egypt. Wiley-Blackwell.
- Naunton, Chris (2018). Searching for the Lost Tombs of Egypt (e-book ed.). Thames & Hudson. ISBN 978-0-500-05199-3.
- Tyldesley, Joyce (2006). Chronicle of the Queens of Egypt. WW Norton. ISBN 0-500-05145-3.
- Payraudeau, Frédéric (2020). L'Égypte et la vallée du Nil. Tome 3: Les époques tardives (1069-332 av. J.-C.) (in French). Humensis. ISBN 978-2-13-082231-8.
- Petrie, Flinders (1897). A History of Egypt. Volume I: From the Earliest Times to the XVIth Dynasty. London: Methuen & Co. OCLC 493045619.
- Petrie, Flinders (1899). A History of Egypt. Volume II: During the XVIIth and XVIIIth Dynasties. London: Methuen & Co.
- Petrie, Flinders (1905). A History of Egypt. Volume II: From the XIXth to the XXXth Dynasties. London: Methuen & Co.
- Ryholt, K. S. B. (1997). The Political Situation in Egypt During the Second Intermediate Period, C. 1800-1550 B.C. Museum Tusculanum Press. ISBN 978-87-7289-421-8.
- Shaw, Ian, ed. (2003) [2000]. The Oxford History of Ancient Egypt. Oxford: Oxford University Press. ISBN 978-0-19-280458-7.
- Shaw, Ian; Nicholson, Paul (1995). The Dictionary of Ancient Egypt. London: The British Museum Press. ISBN 978-0-8109-3225-8.
- Wilkinson, Toby (2005) [1999]. Early dynastic Egypt (PDF) (2nd ed.). Routledge. ISBN 978-0-203-02438-6.
- Wilkinson, Toby (2000). Royal Annals Of Ancient Egypt: The Palermo Stone and its Associated Fragments. London: Kegan Paul International. ISBN 0-7103-0667-9.

Online resources

- Bennett, Chris (2013). "Egyptian Royal Genealogy - Ptolemaic Dynasty".
- Mladjov, Ian. Chronologies. Ian Mladjov's Resources.
  - Mladjov, Ian (2021a). "Earlier rulers of Egypt". Ian Mladjov's Resources.
  - Mladjov, Ian (2021b). "Rulers of Egypt: chronology 1540–310 BC". Ian Mladjov's Resources.
- Lundström, Peter. Pharaohs of Ancient Egypt
  - Lundström, Peter (2025). "The Dynasties of Manetho". Pharaohs of Ancient Egypt.
  - Lundström, Peter (2025b). "List of Pharaohs". Pharaohs of Ancient Egypt.
  - Lundström, Peter (2025c). "Kinglists". Pharaohs of Ancient Egypt.
- Sewell-Lasater, Tara (2020). "Becoming Kleopatra: Ptolemaic Royal Marriage, Incest, and the Path to Female Rule". University of Houston.
- Tetley, M. Christine (2017). The Reconstructed chronology of the Egyptian Kings (2nd ed.). Barry W. Tetley. ISBN 978-0-473-41906-6.
- University College London (2000). "Chronology". Digital Egypt for Universities.
- Wolter, Teagan (2025). "List of pharaohs of ancient Egypt". Encyclopedia Britannica.
