= Sekheperenre =

Egyptian pharaoh

- Skheperenre
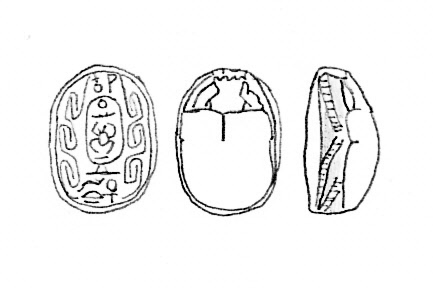
- Scarab seal of Sekheperenre. Ashmolean Museum (AN1935.100a)

Pharaoh
- Reign: 2 months and 1 to 5 days, some time between 1690 BC and 1649 BC
- Predecessor: [...]re
- Successor: Djedkherewre
Royal titulary
Prenomen
Sekheperenre
S-ḫpr.n-rˁ
He whom Ra causes to come into being
M23 t L2 t < N5 s L1 r n >
Variant:
M23 t L2 t < N5 z L1 n >
- Dynasty: 14th dynasty

Sekheperenre was an Egyptian pharaoh of the 14th Dynasty of Egypt during the Second Intermediate Period. According to the Egyptologists Kim Ryholt and Darrell Baker, Sekheperenre was the twenty-second king of the dynasty; alternatively, Jürgen von Beckerath sees him as the seventeenth ruler. As a king of the 14th Dynasty, Sekheperenre would have reigned from Avaris over the eastern Nile Delta and possibly over the western Delta as well.

== Attestation ==
With Nehesy, Nebsenre and Merdjefare, Sekheperenre is one of only four undisputed pharaohs of the 14th Dynasty to have left any attestation beyond the Turin canon, a king list compiled in the early Ramesside period. Indeed, Sekheperenre is attested by a single scarab seal bearing his name. The seal, donated by A. S. Hunt and of unknown provenance, is currently in the Ashmolean Museum.

== Chronological position ==
Sekheperenre's relative position in the 14th Dynasty is somewhat secured by the Turin canon, which mentions him in column 9, line 16 (Gardiner entry 8.16). According to the latest reading of the king list by Ryholt, Sekheperenre reigned 2 months and 1 to 5 days. In the previous authoritative study of the Turin canon, Alan Gardiner had read Sekheperenre's reign length as 2 years, but Ryholt established that the number of years attributed to Sekheperenre by the canon was nil. Sekheperenre was preceded by a king whose name is partially lost "[...]re" and succeeded by Djedkherewre.

The seal has a coil pattern, common in the twelfth to fourteenth dynasties and seal typology may be used to provide supporting evidence for the position and dating of Sekheperenre.

At the opposite, Sekheperenre's absolute chronological position is debated. According to Egyptologists Kim Ryholt and Darrell Baker, Sekheperenre was the twenty-second king of the 14th dynasty. Ryholt's reconstruction of the early 14th Dynasty is controversial however and other specialists, such as Manfred Bietak and Jürgen von Beckerath, believe that the dynasty started shortly before Nehesy c. 1710 BC rather than c. 1805 BC as proposed by Ryholt. In this case, Sekheperenre would only be the seventeenth king of the dynasty.

Preceded by [...]re	Pharaoh of Egypt; Fourteenth Dynasty	Succeeded by Djedkherewre
