= Hotep =

Egyptian word

Htp t p
ḥtp
in hieroglyphs

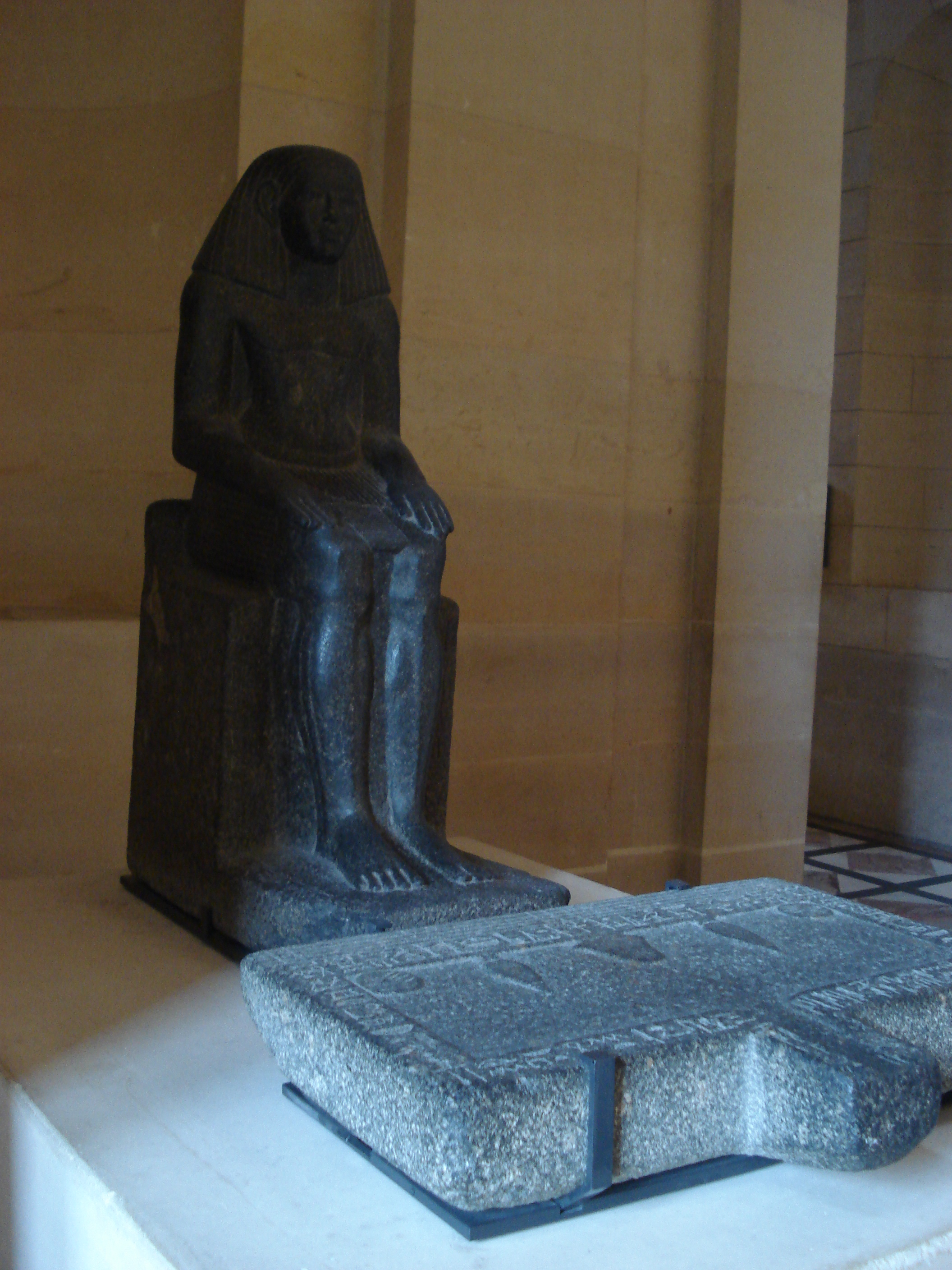
Hotep offering table

Hotep (ḥtp; also rendered hetep) is an Egyptian word that roughly translates as "to be satisfied, at peace". The word also refers to an "offering" ritually presented to a deity or a dead person, hence "be pleased, be gracious, be at peace". It is rendered in Egyptian hieroglyphs as an altar (Gardiner sign R4). The noun ḥtp.w means "peace, contentment". Davies (2018) interprets the concept of ḥtp as "the result of action in accord with maat [the proper order of the universe]".

The so-called offering formula begins with ḥtp-dj-nsw "an offering given by the king".

Egyptian ḥtp became Coptic ϩⲁⲧⲡ/ϩⲟⲧⲡ hatp/hotp "be content" and ϩⲱⲧⲡ hōtp "be reconciled".

Hotep was part of ancient Egyptian names, such as Hotepsekhemwy (ḥr ḥtp-sḫm.wj "the two powers are at peace"), the first ruler of the Second Dynasty of Egypt.

== In personal names ==
Pharaohs

- Hotepsekhemwy (2nd dynasty)
- Mentuhotep I, Mentuhotep II, Mentuhotep III, Mentuhotep IV, Mentuhotep V and Mentuhotep VI (11th to 16th dynasties)
- Amenemhat I (throne name Sehetepibre) (12th dynasty)
- Sehetepibre (13th dynasty)
- Hotepibre (13th dynasty)
- Sobekhotep I, Sobekhotep II, Sobekhotep III, Sobekhotep IV, Merhotepre Sobekhotep V, Khahotepre Sobekhotep VI, Sobekhotep VII and Sobekhotep VIII (13th to 16th dynasties)
- Neferhotep I, Neferhotep II and Neferhotep III (13th to 16th dynasties)
- Merhotepre Ini (13th dynasty)
- Rahotep (17th dynasty)
- Amenhotep I, Amenhotep II, Amenhotep III and Amenhotep IV, later known as Akhenaten (18th dynasty)

Other

- Neithhotep (1st dynasty queen)
- Imhotep (3rd dynasty official)
- Ptahhotep (5th dynasty official)
- Khnumhotep I (12th dynasty nomarch)
- Hedjhotep (minor deity)
- Hetepheres I, Hetepheres II (4th dynasty queens)
- Hetepheres (4th dynasty princess)
- Neferhetepes (4th dynasty princess)
- Hathorhotep (12th dynasty princess)
- Mentuhotep (queen) (16th dynasty queen)

== In popular culture ==
- Nyarlathotep is a deity or a demon in stories by H. P. Lovecraft, and the title of a 1920 short story.
- Hotep is one of the advisors to Pharaoh in the animated epic film The Prince of Egypt (1998).
- The title of the American comedy film Bubba Ho-Tep (2002) refers to the nickname for a reanimated mummy that wears a cowboy hat
- Robin Thede used the derivative term "hertep" in A Black Lady Sketch Show.
