= Sewadjkare III =

Egyptian pharaoh

- Sewadjkare II

Pharaoh
- Reign: about 1 year, starting after c. 1699 BC
- Predecessor: Merdjefare
- Successor: Nebdjefare
Royal titulary
Praenomen
Sewadjkare
S.w3ḏ-k3-Rˁ
He whom the Ka of Ra causes to flourish
M23 t L2 t < ra s wAD kA Z1 >
- Dynasty: 14th dynasty

Sewadjkare III (also known as Sewadjkare II) was an Egyptian pharaoh of the Fourteenth Dynasty of Egypt during the Second Intermediate Period c. 1700 BC. As a king of the 14th Dynasty, Sewadjkare III would have reigned from Avaris over the eastern Nile Delta and possibly over the western Delta as well.

== Evidence ==
No contemporary attestation of Sewadjkare III survives to this day and this pharaoh is only known to us thanks to the Turin canon. This king list was redacted during the early Ramesside period from older documents and serves as the primary source for kings of the second intermediate period. Sewadjkare III's prenomen appears on the 9th column, 6th line of the papyrus.

== Chronological position ==
Sewadjkare III's relative position in the 14th Dynasty is somewhat secured by the Turin canon. According to this king list, Sewadjkare reigned for about one year and was preceded by Merdjefare and succeeded by Nebdjefare.

At the opposite, Sewadjkare III's absolute chronological position is debated. According to Egyptologists Kim Ryholt and Darrell Baker, Sewadjkare III was the eleventh king of the 14th Dynasty, reigning c. 1699 BC for around one year. Ryholt's reconstruction of the early 14th dynasty is controversial however and other specialists, such as Manfred Bietak and Jürgen von Beckerath, believe that the dynasty started shortly before Nehesy c. 1710 BC rather than c. 1805 BC as proposed by Ryholt. In this case, Sewadjkare III would only be the sixth king of the dynasty.

== Identity ==
Sewadjkare III should not be confused with two other pharaohs bearing the same prenomen and who also reigned during the Second Intermediate Period. The earliest of the two is Sewadjkare I of the early 13th Dynasty, c. 1781 BC. Just like Sewadjkare III, Sewadjkare I is known only thanks to the Turin canon. The other pharaoh bearing the same prenomen is Sewadjkare Hori II (also known as Hori II) who reigned at the very end of the 13th Dynasty, from c. 1669 until 1664 BC.

Preceded by Merdjefare	Pharaoh of Egypt; Fourteenth Dynasty	Succeeded by Nebdjefare
