= Sehebre =

Egyptian pharaoh of the 14th dynasty

- Sehabre

Pharaoh
- Reign: 3-4 years, c. 1704-1699 BC
- Predecessor: Nebefawre
- Successor: Merdjefare
Royal titulary
Nomen
Sehebre
Sḥ3b-Rˁ
He whom Ra causes to be festive
< N5 s V28 b W3 N5 >
- Father: uncertain, Sheshi (Ryholt)
- Mother: uncertain, Tati (Ryholt)
- Dynasty: 14th dynasty

Sehebre was a ruler of the Fourteenth Dynasty of Egypt, ruling for three to four years around 1700 BC during the Second Intermediate Period. According to Egyptologists Kim Ryholt, Jürgen von Beckerath, and Darrell Baker, he was the fifth king of the dynasty. As such he would have ruled over the eastern Nile Delta – and possibly over the western Delta as well – from his capital at Avaris.

== Attestation ==
Sehebre is known solely from the Turin canon, a king list redacted during the early Ramesside period, over 400 years after Sehebre's reign. According to the latest reading of the canon by Ryholt, Sehebre's name is given on the 9th column, row 4 of the document (corresponding to entry 8.4 of Gardiner and von Beckerath reading of the canon). Sehebre is credited a reign of 3 to 4 years, an unknown number of months and 1 day by the canon.

== Identity ==
No contemporary attestation of Sehebre is known to this day. However, Ryholt points out that this stands at odds with Sehebre's reign length of three to four years, the longest reign of the 14th Dynasty and only equaled by his successor Merdjefare. At the opposite, kings with shorter reigns, such as Nehesy who reigned around 1 year, are well attested by contemporary artefacts. Thus, Ryholt suggests that Sehebre is to be identified with either Wazad or Sheneh, both of which are well-attested rulers of the 14th Dynasty, but who do not appear in the Turin Canon.

== See also ==
- List of pharaohs

Preceded by Nebefawre	Pharaoh of Egypt; Fourteenth Dynasty	Succeeded by Merdjefare
