= Wazad =

Egyptian pharaoh

- Uazed, Wadjed, Wasa, Uatched
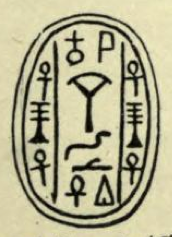
- Scarab of pharaoh Wazad, drawing by Flinders Petrie.

Pharaoh
- Reign: c. 1700 BC, possibly 3–4 years (Ryholt)
Royal titulary
Praenomen
Unknown, possibly Sehebre or Merdjefare (Ryholt)
Nomen
Wazad
Nṯr-nfr W3ḏ-d di-ˁnḫ
The good god, Wazad, given life
nTr nfr M13 I10 d X8 S34
- Dynasty: 14th dynasty

Wazad was an Egyptian pharaoh during the Second Intermediate Period. According to the Egyptologists Kim Ryholt and Darrell Baker, Wazad was a member of the 14th Dynasty of Egypt reigning c. 1700 BC. As a king of the 14th Dynasty, he would have reigned from Avaris over the eastern Nile Delta and possibly over the western Delta as well. The Memphis-based 13th Dynasty reigned over Middle and Upper Egypt at the same time. Alternatively, according to Jürgen von Beckerath and Wolfgang Helck, Wazad was a ruler of the 16th Dynasty and a vassal of the Hyksos 15th Dynasty. This view is debated in Egyptology, in particular because Ryholt and others have argued that the 16th Dynasty was an independent Theban kingdom rather than a vassal dynasty of the Hyksos.

== Attestations ==
Wazad is known from five scarabs, all bearing his nomen Wazad and none giving his prenomen. For this reason, Wazad is difficult to relate to the rulers mentioned on the Turin canon, where only the prenomina subsist for the kings of the 14th Dynasty. The scarabs of Wazad are now in the Egyptian Museum of Berlin (19/64), in the British Museum (BM EA 32319), in the Egyptian Museum (CG 36029) and in a private collection. The last one was stolen in the early 20th century. Finally, a scarab, now in the Petrie Museum (UC 11617) has been attributed to Wazad in the past, but is now believed to be non-royal.

== Chronological position ==
Since only Wazad's nomen is attested, attempts at attributing to him any given prenomen remain conjectural. Ryholt, however, proposes that a seriation of 14th Dynasty seals shows that Wazad reigned after Nehesy. Since furthermore "only few of the kings who ruled between Nehesy and Yaqub-Har are attested by contemporary sources", Ryholt posits that Wazad may be identifiable with one of the successors of Nehesy with the longest reign, either Sehebre or Merdjefare (Turin Canon column 9, lines 4 and 5). Both of these kings reigned three to four years.

In previous studies, Jürgen von Beckerath believed Wazad was a "little Hyksos", a member of the 16th Dynasty and a vassal of the 15th Dynasty. Ryholt has shown however that the 16th Dynasty comprised kings ruling over Thebes and its region from c. 1650 BC until the brief conquest of the city by the Hyksos c. 1580 BC.
