= Sewadjkare Hori =

Egyptian pharaoh

- Hori II, Sewadjkare II

Pharaoh
- Reign: 5 years, ..., and 8 days; c. 17th century BCE
- Predecessor: Mersekhemre Ined
- Successor: Merkawre Sobekhotep
Royal titulary
Prenomen
Sewadjkare
Swˁḏ-k3-Rˁ
He who causes the Ka of Ra to flourish
M23 t L2 t < ra s wAD kA Z1 >
Nomen
Hori
...-ḥr-j
Man of Horus/Follower of Horus
< HASH G5 i >
- Dynasty: 13th dynasty

Sewadjkare Hori (also known as Hori II) was a pharaoh of the late 13th Dynasty, possibly the thirty-sixth king of this dynasty. He reigned over Middle and Upper Egypt for five years, either during the early or mid-17th century, from 1669 until 1664 BC or from 1648 until 1643 BC.

== Attestation ==
Sewadjkare Hori is only known for certain from the Turin canon, row 8, column 7 (Gardiner, von Beckerath: row 7, column 7). The Turin canon provides the prenomen Sewadjkare and the nomen Hori for this king.

Jürgen von Beckerath assigns to him a stone fragment from El-Tod inscribed with the prenomen "Sewadj[...]re". However, since there are two other rulers from the Second Intermediate Period bearing the same prenomen, this identification remains conjectural.

== Identity ==
Sewadjkare Hori should not be confused with Sewadjkare, a pharaoh of the early 13th Dynasty, and with another Sewadjkare III from the mid 14th Dynasty. Both of these pharaohs enjoyed shorter reigns than Sewadjkare Hori.

Preceded by Mersekhemre Ined	Pharaoh of Egypt; Thirteenth Dynasty	Succeeded by Merkawre Sobekhotep
