= Sobekhotep =

Sobekhotep or Sebekhotep is an ancient Egyptian name meaning “Sobek is pleased” or “Sobek is satisfied”, and may refer to:

== Pharaohs ==
=== 13th Dynasty ===
- Sekhemre Khutawy Sobekhotep, believed to be Sobekhotep I
- Khaankhre Sobekhotep, believed to be Sobekhotep II
- Sekhemre Sewadjtawy Sobekhotep III, reigned c. 1740 BC
- Khaneferre Sobekhotep IV, most powerful pharaoh of the 13th Dynasty, c. 1730 BC
- Merhotepre Sobekhotep, also known as Sobekhotep V, reigned c. 1724 BC
- Khahotepre Sobekhotep VI, reigned c. 1696 BC
- Merkawre Sobekhotep, reigned c. 1664 BC

=== 16th Dynasty ===
- Sekhemre Seusertawy Sobekhotep VIII, reigned c. 1645 BC

== Nobles ==
- Sobekhotep (Middle Kingdom treasurer) (12th dynasty)

=== 13th Dynasty ===
- Sobekhotep (13th dynasty), son of Seneb, the brother of Sobekhotep III
- Sobekhotep (13th dynasty), grandfather of Queen Nubkhaes
- Sobekhotep Miu (13th dynasty), son of Sobekhotep IV
- Sobekhotep Djadja (13th dynasty), son of Sobekhotep IV
- Sobekhotep (13th dynasty), son of Sobekhotep VII

=== 16th Dynasty ===
- Sobekhotep (16th dynasty), mother of Queen Mentuhotep
- Sobekhotep (16th dynasty), possibly a son of Dedumose I

=== 18th Dynasty ===
- Sobekhotep (mayor of the Faiyum) (18th dynasty)
- Sobekhotep (New Kingdom treasurer) (18th dynasty)

== See also ==
- Sobekneferu, last ruler of the Twelfth Dynasty
- Sobek, nomen of an unidentified pharaoh of the early 13th Dynasty, possibly Nerikare or Sekhemrekhutawy Khabaw
