= Seheqenre Sankhptahi =

Egyptian pharaoh

- Sehekaenre Seankhptah, Se'anchptah
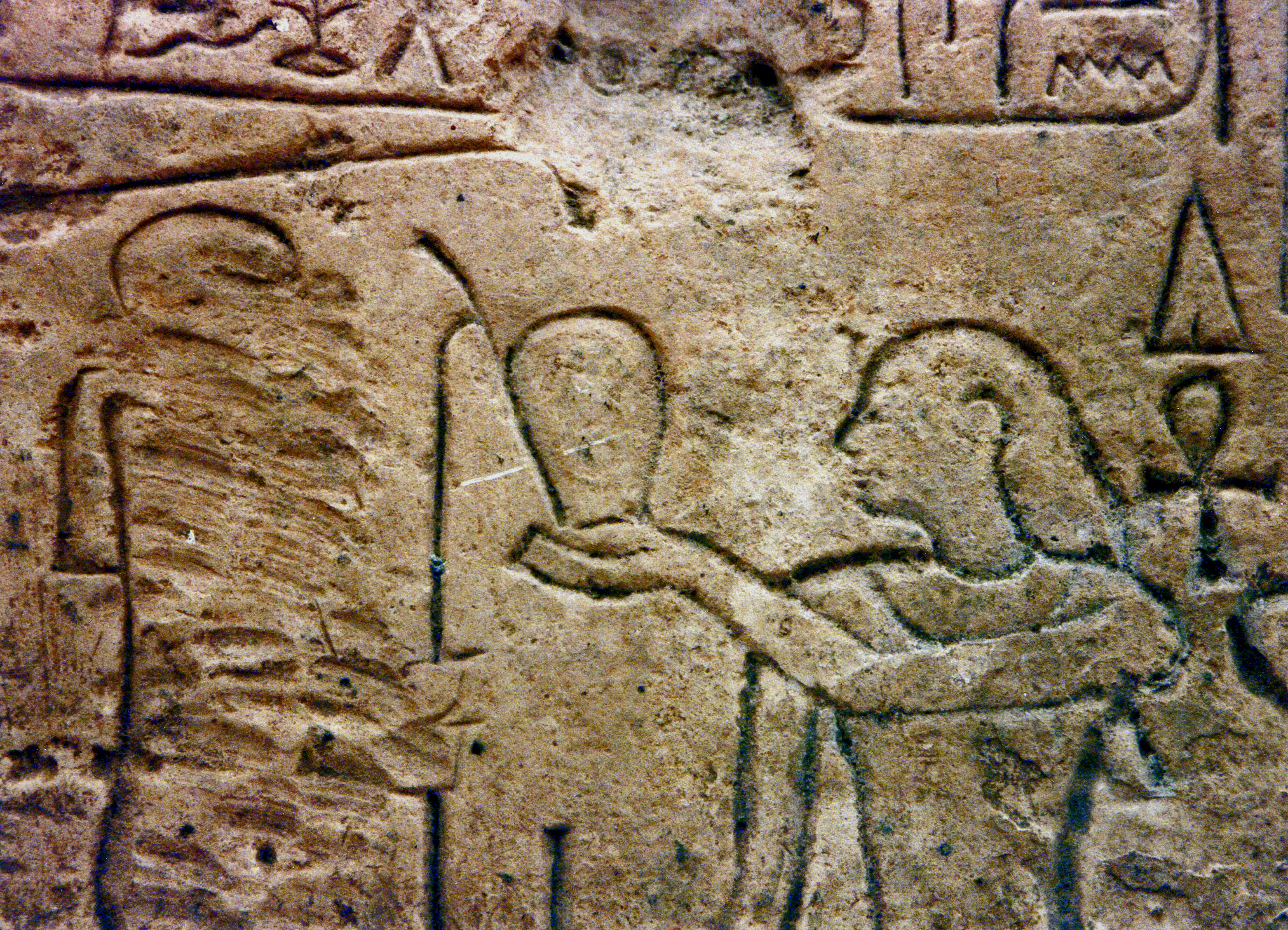
- Detail of the stele of Nebsumenu depicting pharaoh Seheqenre Sankhptahi offering ms.t oil to the god Ptah, National Archaeological Museum of Spain.

Pharaoh
- Reign: unknown duration
- Predecessor: Sekhemkare II (?)
- Successor: unknown
Royal titulary
Prenomen
Seheqenre
S.ḥḳ-n-Rˁ
He whom Ra causes to rule< N5 s S38 q Y1 n >
Turin canon
[Sehe]qenre
[S.ḥ]ḳ-n-Rˁ
He whom Ra causes to rule
< N5 HASH q Y1 n >
Nomen
Sankhptahi
S-ˁnḫ-ptḥ-i
He whom Ptah causes to live
G39 N5 < C20 s S34 i >
- Father: uncertain, possibly Sekhemkare II
- Dynasty: 13th dynasty

Seheqenre Sankhptahi was a pharaoh of the late 13th Dynasty, possibly the fifty-fourth or fifty-fifth king of this dynasty. He most likely reigned for a short period over the Memphite region during the mid-17th century BC, some time between 1663 BC and 1649 BC.

== Family ==
A stele of unknown provenance, although probably Memphite in origin, and dated on stylistic grounds to the Second Intermediate Period presents a list of members of a royal family and gives the king's son name as [?]-ptḥ-i. If this prince is the future pharaoh Seheqenre Sankhptahi as Ryholt proposes, then pharaoh Sekhemkare II is his father and Minemsaes and Sit[...] are his sisters. The stele is housed in the Egyptian Museum (CG20600).

== Attestions ==
Of Unknown Provenance, a round-topped stela dated to Year 1 of Sehekaenre Sankhiptah.

Pharaoh Seheqenre Sankhptahi is named and represented on the stele of royal sealer and overseer of sealers Nebsumenu. Kim Ryholt notes that it depicts Sankhptahi offering oil to the god Ptah (defaced) "He who is south of his wall" (rsy-snb=f) and to Anubis (defaced) "Lord of bandagers" (nb wtyw), both of which are epithets from the Memphite region. Ryholt concludes that Seheqenre Sankhptahi probably reigned over Memphis and thus belongs to the 13th dynasty, which had control over the region at the time. Furthermore, Ryholt suggests that Sankhptahi may himself have been born in Memphis, as indicated by his theophorous name based on Ptah, the god of the city.

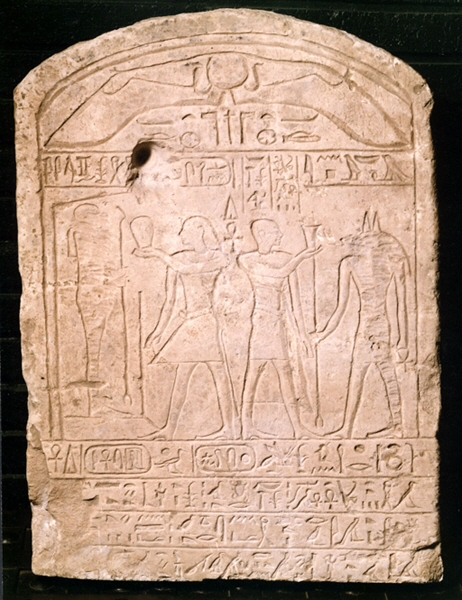
Stele of Nebsumenu representing Seheqenre Sankhptahi making offerings to Ptah and Anubis.

=== Non-contemporary attestations ===
The Turin canon 8:25 contains the damaged prenomen [?]ḳ-n-Rˁ. Ryholt remarks that Seheqenre is the only king of the period whose name matches these signs and reads [S.ḥ]ḳ-n-Rˁ

=== Uncertain attestations ===
Ryholt points to a blue-green steatite cylinder seal of unknown provenance and bearing the golden horus name Sekhaenptah, S.ḫˁ-n-ptḥ, He whom Ptah causes to appear, as maybe belonging to Seheqenre Sankhptahi. Percy Newberry simply dates the seal to "about the end of the Middle Kingdom" without further identification of its owner. The seal is probably lost: originally in the Timmins collection housed in the Metropolitan Museum of Art, it is now reportedly missing from the museum.
