= Merkawre Sobekhotep =

Ancient Egyptian king during the Second Intermediate Period

Merkawre Sobekhotep (mr-kꜣw-rꜥ sbk-ḥtp)
- Sobekhotep VII; Merkaure
- Inscription from a pink granite seated statue of Merkawre Sobekhotep discovered in Karnak.

Pharaoh
- Reign: 2 years, ..., and 3 or 4 days; c. 17th century BC. Estimated by Kim Ryholt to be 2 and a half years
- Predecessor: Sewadjkare Hori
- Successor: unknown
Royal titulary
Prenomen
Turin canon
Merka[w]re Sobek[hotep]
He who loves the Ka[s] of Ra, Sobek [is satisfied]
< N5 U7 D21 Z1 D28 Z1 HASH I3 HASH >
Nomen
Sobekhotep
Sobek is satisfied
Sbk ḥtp
G39 N5 < sbk Htp t p >
- Children: Bebi(?), Sobekhotep(?)
- Dynasty: 13th dynasty

Merkawre Sobekhotep (VII) was an Ancient Egyptian petty king during the Second Intermediate Period. His chronological position within this period is unclear. The period represents the transition between the Middle Kingdom (Middle Bronze) and New Kingdom (Late Bronze), a time of climate change and socio-economic problems leading to political turmoil with numerous claimants to the throne throughout the country.

== Biography ==
=== Reign ===
Merkaure had a short reign of two regnal years. Not much is known about this king besides some attestations found in the Karnak Temple, Thebes, Upper Egypt. These items may indicate that he ruled at Karnak or they were brought to Karnak as looted items. One object refers to the local deity Amun, while another refers to the Mouth/Speaker of Nekhen, a town further south. However, his name in the Karnak King List shows that he was not omitted and forgotten by people in the Thebaid region. The order of succession is unclear as he does not provide any evidence of his right to succession.

=== Family ===
==== Children ====
The attestations mentions two King's Sons who may have been his sons. However, they are apparently adult with several titles. Considering the short reign of the king, the king's sons were either born non-royal or may have gotten their titles from another king.

- Bebi - "king's son" and of "court official".
- Sobekhotep - "king's son" and of "court official".

=== Titulary (Royal names) ===
His Horus, Nebty, and Golden Horus names are unknown.

His prenomen mr-kꜣw-rꜥ can be transliterated as Merkawre (Mer-kaw-re) or Merkaure (Mer-kau-re), and translated as masc. "mr" (beloved) + "Ka.w" (ka part of the soul + .w plural) + "Ra" (deity)", "Beloved Kas of Ra". The name can be compared to Khakaure Senusret II of the 12th Dynasty. An alternative reading is Ramerkau/Ramerkaw (rꜥ-mr-kꜣw).

His nomen Sobekhotep (sbk-hotep) consist of the elements Sobek (deity) + hotep (peace). The name became popular as a common name during the 12th Dynasty and became a royal name for several rulers during the 13th Dynasty.

== Attestations ==
Merkaure is only attested by a few attestations mainly from Thebes, Upper Egypt, with one reference to Nekhen (Hierakonpolis).

=== Contemporary ===
Merkawre Sobekhotep is attested by a scarab-seal of unknown origin.

He is also attested by two statues dedicated to Amun. The statues were originally from Karnak and are now in the Egyptian Museum and in the Louvre Museum respectively. The statues present Merkawre Sobekhotep with two sons Bebi and Sobekhotep, both bearing the titles of "king's son" and of "court official".

==== Seated Statue Louvre E 7824 ====
At Karnak, a pink granite seated statue with the royal name.

==== Seated Statue Cairo JE 43599 ====
At Karnak, a granite seated statue dedicated to Amun with the royal name of mr-kꜣw-rꜥ sbk-ḥtp. Also mentioned (1) Bebi King's Son, Seb Official, Mouth of Hierakonpolis (sꜣ-nsw; sꜣb; rꜣ-nḫn bbj (PD 228 weak)) and (2) Sobekhotep King's Son, Seb Official, Mouth of Hierakonpolis (sꜣ-nsw; sꜣb; rꜣ-nḫn sbk-ḥtp).

Bebi (PD 228 weak) may be mentioned in Bologna EG 1927 as "king's son", and Stela Cairo CG 20578 as “senior king's son” and “true king's son”.

=== Non-contemporary ===
In the New Kingdom, Merkawre Sobekhotep was mentioned in the Karnak King List (Thutmose III, 18th Dynasty) and Turin King List (Ramesses II, 19th Dynasty).

==== Karnak King List ====
The Karnak King List 42 (45) mentions "Merkaure". He is mentioned along with Mersekhemre (41 (46)) and Sekhemre Seusertawy (43 (44)). The list itself is not considered chronological, and only a select number of rulers are mentioned. The kings sit in rows of four/five kings and the different numbering can depend on what direction the names are read.

Preceded by KAR 41 (46) Mersekhemre	KAR 42 (45); Merkaura Sobekhotep	Succeeded by KAR 43 (44) Sekhemre Seusertawy

==== Turin canon ====
The Turin King List 8:08 mentions: "The Dual King Merkau[ra] Sobek[hotep], 2 years, [x months], 4 days". In this list he is preceded by Sewadjkare Hori (8:07) and succeeded by [Lost] 8:09. After Merkawre Sobekhotep's kingship, the sequence of rulers of the 13th dynasty is highly uncertain due to a large lacuna affecting the Turin canon. Four to seven king names are lost to the lacuna. Notably both his prenomen and nomen are mentioned together.

Preceded by TUR 8:07 Sewadjkare Hori	TUR 8:08; Merkaura Sobekhotep; 2 years ... 4 days	Succeeded by TUR 8:09 [...]

== Theories ==
The exact chronological position of Merkawre Sobekhotep in the 13th dynasty is not known for certain owing to uncertainties affecting earlier kings of the dynasty. Darrell Baker makes him the thirty-seventh king of the dynasty, Kim Ryholt sees him as the thirty-eighth king and Jürgen von Beckerath places him as the thirty-second pharaoh of the dynasty.

=== Speculations ===
He probably reigned over Middle and perhaps Upper Egypt during the mid-17th century BC from 1664 BC until 1663 BC. Alternatively, the German Egyptologist Thomas Schneider dates this short-lived king's reign from 1646 BC to 1644 BC

Preceded by Sewadjkare Hori	Pharaoh of Egypt; Thirteenth Dynasty	Unknown
