= Waza =

Waza or WAZA may refer to:

- WAZA (FM), a radio station (107.7 FM) licensed to Liberty, Mississippi, United States
- World Association of Zoos and Aquariums
- Detroit Waza, an American arena soccer team
- Waza National Park in Cameroon
- a term used in Chad and Sudan to describe long metal trumpets elsewhere known as kakaki or malakat
- The House of Vasa
- Waza, an annual event hosted by Heroku for art and technique of application development
- Wasa, also called Wazad, a pharaoh of the 14th dynasty of Egypt
- a line of products by Boss Corporation
