= King Ini =

King Ini may refer to:

- Ine of Wessex, King of Wessex from AD 689–726

Or one of several Egyptian pharaohs:

- Nyuserre Ini, pharaoh of the 5th Dynasty of Egypt, during the 25th century BC, Old Kingdom
- Qakare Ini, pretender to the Egyptian throne during the 11th or 12th Dynasty
- Merhotepre Ini, pharaoh of the 13th Dynasty of Egypt during the Second Intermediate Period, c. 1675 BC
- Mershepsesre Ini II, pharaoh of the late 13th Dynasty of Egypt during the Second Intermediate Period, c. 1650 BC
- Menkheperre Ini, a king of the 23rd Dynasty of Egypt ruling over Thebes, during the Third Intermediate Period in the 8th century BC
