= Mershepsesre Ini II =

Egyptian pharaoh of the 13th Dynasty

- Ana, Ani, Inai, Inj
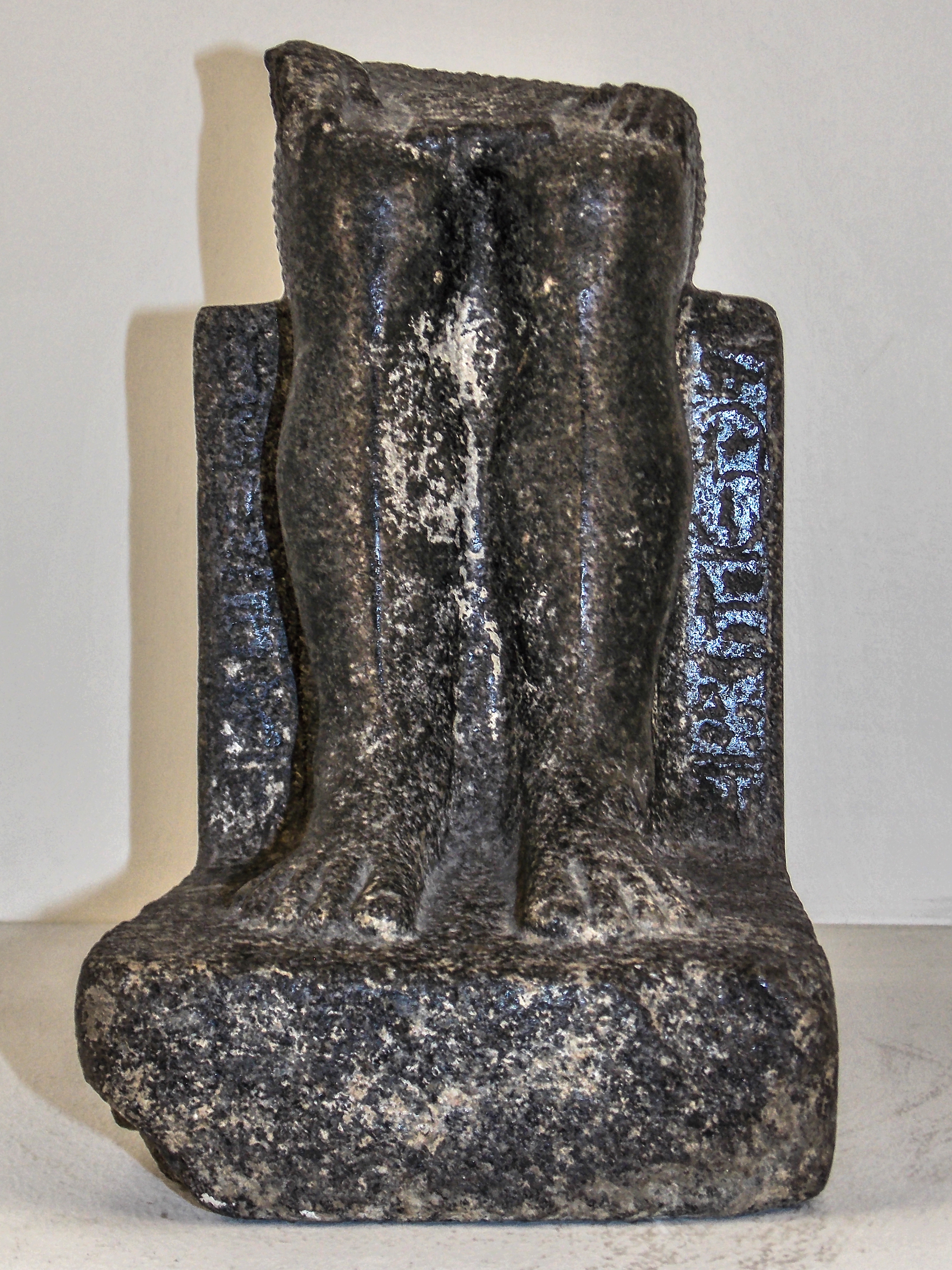
- Sitting statue of Mershepsesre, now in Benevento

Pharaoh
- Reign: unknown length
- Predecessor: uncertain, Sewadjare Mentuhotep V (new arrangement) or Mer...re (von Beckerath)
- Successor: uncertain, Mersekhemre Neferhotep II (new arrangement) or Merkheperre (von Beckerath)
Royal titulary
Prenomen
Mershepsesre
Mr-šps-Rˁ
The noble one who loves Ra
M23 t L2 t < ra U7 A50 s >
Nomen
Ini
Jnj

G39 N5	i K1 n i
- Dynasty: 13th Dynasty

Mershepsesre Ini (also known as Ini II) was a pharaoh of the late 13th Dynasty, possibly the forty-sixth king of this dynasty. He reigned over Upper Egypt during the mid-17th century BC.

== Attestations ==
Mershepsesre Ini is attested only by a single inscription, giving his nomen and prenomen carved on the lower half of a statue which originated from the precinct of Amun-Ra in Karnak. In Roman times, the statue was brought to the Temple of Isis at Benevento, Italy, where it was unearthed in 1957; the statue is now housed in the local Museo del Sannio.
Ini may also be attested on the Turin canon in column 8, row 16, which reads "Mer...re". If this identification is correct, Mershepsesre Ini II was the forty-sixth king of the dynasty. Kim Ryholt proposed instead that the "Mer...re" of the Turin canon refers to Mersekhemre Neferhotep II, whom he regards as a different ruler from Mersekhemre Ined. Nevertheless, Mershepsesre Ini must have reigned toward the end of the dynasty.

== Chronological position ==
The exact chronological position of Mershepsesre Ini is uncertain, although he must have reigned at the end of the 13th Dynasty. In his reconstruction of the Second Intermediate Period, Kim Ryholt does not give any position to Mershepsesre Ini due to a lack of evidence. In the new arrangement, Mershepesre Ini's predecessor is Sewadjare Mentuhotep V and his successor is Mersekhemre Neferhotep II. Jürgen von Beckerath instead gives the "Mer...re" of the Turin canon as the predecessor of Mershepsesre Ini and his successor as Merkheperre.

Preceded by Mentuhotep V	Pharaoh of Egypt; Thirteenth Dynasty	Succeeded by Mersekhemre Neferhotep II
