= Merdjefare =

Egyptian pharaoh

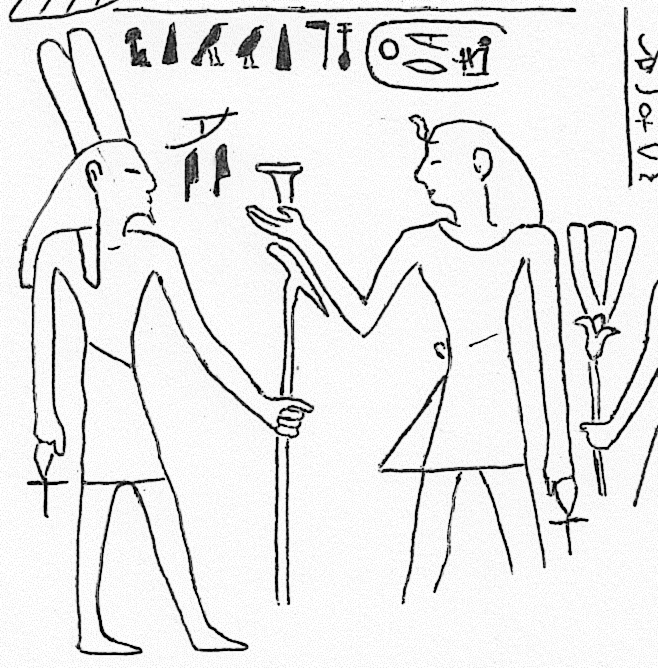
- Merdjefare (right) offering to the god Sopdharsopd (left)

Pharaoh
- Reign: 3 to 4 years, starting after c. 1704 BC and finishing 1699 BC
- Predecessor: Sehebre
- Successor: Sewadjkare III
Royal titulary
Praenomen
Merdjefare
Mr-ḏf3-rˁ

M23 L2	N5 mr r I10 f G1 G41 G36
Nomen
Unknown, possibly Wazad (after Ryholt)
- Dynasty: 14th Dynasty

Merdjefare was an ancient Egyptian pharaoh of the 14th Dynasty of Egypt during the Second Intermediate Period c. 1700 BC. As a king of the 14th Dynasty, Merdjefare would have reigned from Avaris over the eastern Nile Delta and possibly over the western Delta as well.

== Attestation ==
Merdjefare is one of only four pharaohs of the 14th Dynasty to have left any attestation beyond the Turin canon, a king list compiled in the early Ramesside period. Indeed, Merdjefare is mentioned on the stele of a royal seal-bearer and treasurer named Ranisonb. The stele, discovered in 1988–89, shows Merdjefare making offerings to Sopdharsopd and probably originates from Ranisonb's tomb at Saft el-Hinna in the southeastern Nile Delta. The stele is now in the private Krief collection.

== Chronological Position ==
Merdjefare's relative position in the 14th Dynasty is somewhat secured by the Turin canon, which mentions him in column 9, line 5. According to this king list, Merdjefare reigned for 3 to 4 years, one of the longest reigns of the 14th Dynasty, and was preceded by Sehebre and succeeded by Sewadjkare III.

At the opposite, Merdjefare's absolute chronological position is debated. According to egyptologists Kim Ryholt and Darrell Baker, Merdjefare was the tenth king of the 14th Dynasty, reigning c. 1700 BC for 3 to 4 years. Ryholt's reconstruction of the early 14th Dynasty is controversial however and other specialists, such as Manfred Bietak and Jürgen von Beckerath, believe that the dynasty started shortly before Nehesy c. 1710 BC rather than c. 1805 BC as proposed by Ryholt. In this case, Merdjefare would only be the fifth king of the dynasty.

== Identity ==
Since only Merdjefare's prenomen is known, attempts at attributing him any given nomen remain conjectural. Ryholt however proposed that Merdjefare's nomen may have been either Wazad or Sheneh. Indeed, according to Ryholt, a seriation of 14th Dynasty seals shows that both Wazad and Sheneh reigned after Nehesy. Since furthermore "only few of the kings who ruled between Nehesy and Yaqub-Har are attested by contemporary sources", Ryholt posits that Wazad may be identifiable with one of the successors of Nehesy with the longest reign, either Sehebre or Merdjefare.

Preceded by Sehebre	Pharaoh of Egypt; Fourteenth Dynasty	Succeeded by Sewadjkare III
