= Sekhemkare II =

17th century BC Egyptian pharaoh

Pharaoh
- Predecessor: Unknown
- Successor: Seheqenre Sankhptahi
- Dynasty: XIII dynasty

Sekhemkare II was a pharaoh of the late 13th dynasty of ancient Egypt. He was mentioned in the Turin King List (line 8, row 24, fragments 93 and 95), where he is recorded as [...]kara. There are rumors that in the Chas collection there is a fragment of the Turin papyrus with the hieroglyph sḫm that fits into the hole between fragments 93 and 95, there is no confirmation of this. He is also mentioned on the Seheqenre Sankhptahi stele as Sa[...]kara. All this gives rise to a fairly strong hypothesis, as suggested by Darrell Baker, that his name was Sekhemkare.
