= Heribre =

Egyptian pharaoh

- Heribra

Pharaoh
- Predecessor: Awibre
- Successor: Nebsenre
Royal titulary
Prenomen
Heribre

M23 X1 L2 X1	ra h r mDAt ib Z1
- Dynasty: 14th dynasty

Heribre or Heribra was an Egyptian king of the Fourteenth Dynasty, in the Second Intermediate Period. He is known from the Turin King List, where he appears between Awibra and Nebsenra (or Nebsenre).
