= Tati (queen) =

- Queen consort of Egypt
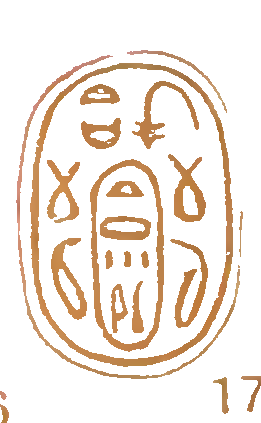
- Scarab of queen Tati in a drawing by Percy Newberry. British Museum BM20824
- Spouse: Sheshi (uncertain)
- Issue: Nehesy (uncertain)
- Dynasty: Second Intermediate Period; 14th Dynasty? 15th Dynasty?

Tati was an ancient Egyptian king's wife of the 14th Dynasty or 15th Dynasty in the Second Intermediate Period. Her chronological position is unknown.

== Attestations ==
Tati is poorly attested with no major archaeological monuments.

King's Wife Tati is known from several scarab seals. A total of eleven scarab name seals of Tati have been found. They bear both her name and her royal titles, and on some scarabs the name is enclosed in a cartouche. Scarab seals indicate that goods were stored at or sent from estates controlled by Tati. The scarabs have features associated with the 14th Dynasty and 15th Dynasty.

=== Scarabs with cartouche ===
The cartouche was reserved for the king and sometimes the heir apparent. There are only a few examples of females writing their names in cartouche. The fact that Tati wrote her name inside a cartouce is significant because it suggests she held a status beyond that of a typical queen consort. The use of a cartouche could indicate that she may have had a hereditary role as the heir apparent, or a ruling role as a regent or a ruler in her own right.

- Seal, Basel Cat. 130
- Seal, Berlin ÄM 32716
- Seal, Berlin ÄM 32717
- Seal, BM EA 20824 found at Tell el-Yahudiya.
- Seal, MMA 30.8.646
- Seal, Sotheby's London 21.04.1975 no. 88 (5)

=== Scarabs without cartouche ===
If she wrote her name in cartouche on many scarabs, it is also significant that her name appear without a cartouche on some scarabs. This may indicate that she started as a king's wife and then had her status elevated to justify the use of a cartouche. One example could be the death of her husband and the succession of a minor heir where she acted as a regent.

- Seal, Aberdeen ABDUA:81055 found at Tell el-Yahudiya.
- Seal, BM EA 37721
- Seal, Cairo JE 75042

== Theories ==
=== Wife of Sheshi, Mother of Nehesy ===
Ryholt (1997) believe Tati played an official political role. Such seals are otherwise only known for kings, heirs apparent and royal treasurers of the Fourteenth Dynasty, and the use of the cartouche is attested otherwise mainly for kings. Tati's seals have been found at Leontopolis and Abydos. Since her scarabs are of two designs, this has allowed them to be dated to the reign of Sheshi, since the designs correspond to a change that took place during his reign, as evidenced by his hundreds of surviving seals. The most likely explanation for her prominence is that she was the wife of Sheshi.

The Egyptologist Kim Ryholt suggested that Tati's marriage was probably part of a dynastic alliance between Sheshi and the Kushite rulers of Kerma. This is suggested by the strong relations the Fourteenth Dynasty is known to have had with Kerma, as well as by the names of Tati and her presumed son. The name Tati is attested in earlier execration texts naming a Kushite queen (spouse of Awaw) as one of the enemies of the pharaoh. It is possible that this earlier Tati was an ancestor and namesake of the Egyptian queen. A royal lineage for Tati would also explain why she of all the consorts of the Fourteenth Dynasty was accorded such high status, since her marriage was one of equals, forming an alliance between kingdoms.

According to Ryholt, Tati's son by Sheshi was Nehesy (nḥsy), whose name means "the Nubian", referring to the region around Kerma. On this theory, Nehesy probably received his name from his mother. Since he is known to have been an old man at the time of his accession, it is likely that Tati had died by then. There are no references to her with the title of queen mother.

=== New finds ===
Ryholt's interpretation has been challenged by a newly found stela that places Nehesy at the end rather than the beginning of the Second Intermediate Period. According to the stela, he was the brother of the "king's sister", Tany, who was most likely of Theban origin, making it unlikely that his mother was Tati.

== Bibliography ==
- Ryholt, Kim (1997). The Political Situation in Egypt during the Second Intermediate Period, c. 1800–1550 B.C. Carsten Niebuhr Institute Publications. Vol. 20. Museum Tusculanum Press. ISBN 978-87-7289-421-8.
- Yehia, Maha (2016). "The Three Stelae of King Nehsy from Tell Habwe at Al Arish Museum: A New Interpretation". Journal of Faculty of Tourism and Hotels, Fayoum University. 10 (2): 469–482.
