= Sankhenre Sewadjtu =

Egyptian pharaoh of the 13th Dynasty

- S'ankhre'enswadtju, Sewadjtew

Pharaoh
- Reign: 3 Years, 2 to 4 Months, from 1675 BC until 1672 BC or in 1694 BC or in 1654 BC
- Predecessor: Merhotepre Ini
- Successor: Mersekhemre Ined
Royal titulary
Praenomen
Sankhenre Sewadjtu
S.ˁnḫ-n-Rˁ-sw3ḏtw
The one whom Re has brought to life, he who is caused to flourish
< N5 s anx n Aa1 n s wAD t Z7 > G7
- Dynasty: 13th dynasty

Sankhenre Sewadjtu was the thirty-fourth pharaoh of the Thirteenth Dynasty of Egypt during the Second Intermediate Period. Sewadjtu reigned from Memphis, starting in 1675 BC and for a period of 3 years and 2 to 4 months.

== Attestations ==
Sankhenre Sewadjtu is unknown from contemporary historical records, and is exclusively attested by the Turin canon. This may be because he ruled Egypt at a time when the 13th Dynasty's control over Egypt was receding. He is listed as the successor of Ini in the Turin Canon, on column 7 line 5, and is given a reign of 3 years and 2 to 4 months in this document.

Kim Ryholt proposes that Sankhenre Sewadjtu is attested on the Karnak king list under a different name owing to a scribal error. Indeed, two prenomina Sewadjenre (#33, 59) and two prenomina Snefer[...]re (# 42, 60) are recorded in this list but Ryholt points out that, in each case, only one king with such prenomen is known. Ryholt thus proposes that the two remaining names refer to Sankhenre Sewadjtu and Seankhenre Mentuhotepi. Indeed, Ryholt notes that wadj, nfr and ankh resemble each other in hieratic.

== Chronological position ==
The exact chronological position of Sankhenre Sewadjtu in the 13th Dynasty is not known for certain owing to uncertainties affecting earlier kings of the dynasty. Darrell Baker makes him the thirty-fourth pharaoh of the dynasty, Kim Ryholt sees him as the thirty-fifth king and Jürgen von Beckerath places him as the twenty-ninth pharaoh of the dynasty.

Preceded by Merhotepre Ini	Pharaoh of Egypt; Thirteenth Dynasty	Succeeded by Mersekhemre Ined
