= Nebdjefare =

Pharaoh of the Fourteenth Dynasty of Egypt

Pharaoh
- Reign: c. 1694 BC – c. 1693 BC
Royal titulary
Prenomen
Nebdjefare
The possessor of Re's bounty

M23 X1 L2 X1	N5 N5 nb I10 I9 G1 G41 G36
- Dynasty: Fourteenth Dynasty

Nebdjefare was a pharaoh of the Fourteenth Dynasty of Egypt. He appears to have ruled during the Second Intermediate Period, for between 12 and 24 months, during the 17th century BC. Knowledge of his reign comes entirely from the severely damaged Turin King List.

== Biography ==
Nebdjefare is an obscure pharaoh of the Fourteenth Dynasty of Egypt, known only from the Turin King List. He would have ruled the north of Lower Egypt between 12 and 24 months in the early 17th century BC. Scholars have variously placed the beginning of his reign at c. 1694 BC (Ryholt & Bülow-Jacobsen 1997) and c. 1672 BC (Gonzalez 1995), a time usually considered part of the Second Intermediate Period or of the very end of the Middle Kingdom. At the time of his reign, the Thirteenth Dynasty would still have been ruling the rest of Egypt from Memphis.

Knowledge of his reign comes from the Turin King List, a badly damaged papyrus that recorded the names of Egyptian Gods, and the reigns of pharaohs from the First through the Seventeenth Dynasty of Egypt. Because of the extensive damage to the papyrus, while the section giving the length of his rule as being one year is preserved, the section of months and days is lost. He therefore would have ruled between 12 and 24 months. Nebdjefare is the seventh pharaoh of the ninth column on the Turin King List. Due to papyrus damage, his nomen has not survived.
