= Nebsenre =

Egyptian pharaoh of the 14th Dynasty of Egypt

- Ranebsen
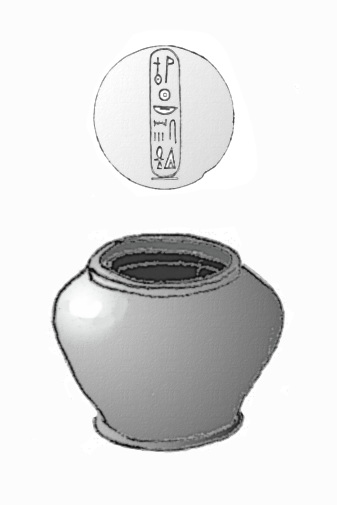
- Small jar and jar lid with cartouche of Nebsenre

Pharaoh
- Reign: at least 5 months in the first half of the 17th century BCE
- Predecessor: Heribre
- Successor: unknown
Royal titulary
Prenomen
Nebsenre
Nb.sn Rˁ
Their Lord is Ra
M23 t L2 t < N5 nb s n Z2 >
- Dynasty: 14th Dynasty

Nebsenre (meaning "Their Lord is Ra") was an Egyptian pharaoh of the 14th Dynasty of Egypt during the Second Intermediate Period. Nebsenre reigned for a least five months over the Eastern and possibly Western Nile Delta, some time during the first half of the 17th century BCE. As such Nebsenre was a contemporary of the Memphis based 13th Dynasty.

== Attestations ==
=== Historical source ===
The prenomen "Nebsenre" is preserved on the ninth column, 14th row (Note: Following Ryholt's reconstruction of the Turin canon. This corresponds to the eighth column, fourteenth row in the reconstruction of the canon of Gardiner and von Beckerath.) of the Turin canon, a list of kings written during the reign of Ramses II (1279–1213 BCE) which serves as the primary historical source for the Second Intermediate Period. The canon further credits Nebsenre with a lost number of years, five months and 20 days of reign following Heribre on the throne. The prenomen of Nebsenre's successor is written as wsf on the Turin king list, indicating that his name was already lost in a lacuna of the document from which the canon was copied in Ramesside times.

=== Contemporary artefact ===
Nebsenre is one of only four kings of the 14th Dynasty to be attested by an artefact contemporary with his reign: a jar of unknown provenance bearing his prenomen, which was in the private Michailidis collection.

== Chronological position ==
According to the Egyptologists Kim Ryholt and Darrell Baker, Nebsenre was the 14th king of the 14th Dynasty, a line of rulers of Canaanite descent reigning over the eastern Nile Delta from c. 1700 BCE until c. 1650 BCE. (Note: Ryholt dates the beginning of the 14th Dynasty to c. 1800 BCE, adding five kings to it before Nehesy. This is rejected by most Egyptologists, who consider Nehesy to have been either the founder or the second king of the dynasty.) Alternatively, the Egyptologist Jürgen von Beckerath sees him as the fifteenth ruler, due to a differing reconstruction of the early 14th Dynasty.

== Bibliography ==
- Baker, Darrell D. (2008). The Encyclopedia of the Egyptian Pharaohs. Volume I: Predynastic to the Twentieth Dynasty (3300–1069 BC). London: Bannerstone Press. ISBN 978-1-905299-37-9.
- Bourriau, Janine (2003). "The Second Intermediate Period (c. 1650–1550 BC)". In Shaw, Ian (ed.). The Oxford History of Ancient Egypt (new ed.). Oxford: Oxford University Press. ISBN 978-0-19-280458-7.
- Kaplony, Peter (1973). Beschriftete Kleinfunde in der Sammlung Georges Michailidis: Ergebnisse einer Bestandsaufnahme im Sommer 1968. Uitgaven van het Nederlands Historisch-Archaeologisch Instituut te İstanbul, 32. Istanbul: Nederlands Historisch-Archeologisch Instituut in het Nabije Oosten. OCLC 1064212.
- Leprohon, Ronald J. (2013). The great name: ancient Egyptian royal titulary. Writings from the ancient world, no. 33. Atlanta: Society of Biblical Literature. ISBN 978-1-58-983736-2.
- Quirke, Stephen (2001). "Second Intermediate Period". In Redford, Donald B. (ed.). The Oxford Encyclopedia of Ancient Egypt, Volume 3. Oxford University Press. pp. 260–265. ISBN 978-0-19-510234-5.
- Ryholt, Kim (1997). The Political Situation in Egypt during the Second Intermediate Period, c. 1800–1550 B.C. CNI publications, 20. Carsten Niebuhr Institute of Near Eastern Studies, University of Copenhagen : Museum Tusculanum Press. ISBN 978-87-7289-421-8.
- Ryholt, Kim (2012). "The Royal Canon of Turin". In Hornung, Erik; Krauss, Rolf; Warburton, David (eds.). Ancient Egyptian Chronology. Handbook of Oriental Studies. Leiden, Boston: Brill. pp. 26–32. ISBN 978-90-04-11385-5. ISSN 0169-9423.
- von Beckerath, Jürgen (1999). Handbuch der ägyptischen Königsnamen (in German). Münchner ägyptologische Studien, Heft 49, Mainz : Philip von Zabern. ISBN 978-3-8053-2591-2.

Preceded by Heribre	Pharaoh of Egypt; Fourteenth Dynasty	Unknown
