= Sobekhotep VIII =

Ancient Egyptian ruler during the Second Intermediate Period

Sekhemre Seusertawy Sobekhotep VIII
- Sobkhotep, Sebekhotep
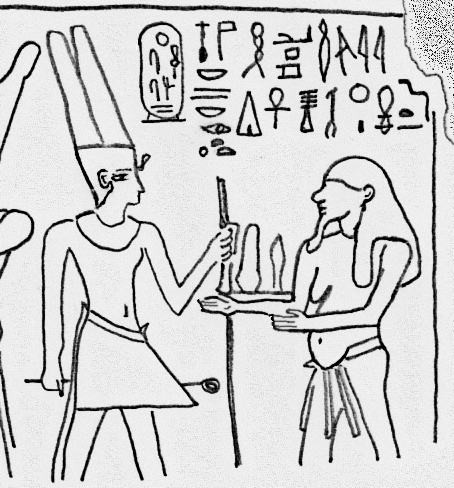
- Sobekhotep VIII (left) facing the god Hapi, from the Inundation Stela

Pharaoh
- Reign: Year 4 (highest attestation); 16 regnal years? 1645-1629 BC
- Predecessor: Djehuti
- Successor: Neferhotep III
Royal titulary
Prenomen
Sekhemre Seusertawy
Sḫm-Rˁ-s-wsr-t3.wj
Powerful is Ra, he who makes the two lands strong

M23 X1 L2 X1	ra sxm s wsr s tA tA
Nomen
Sobekhotep
Sbk-ḥtp
Sobek is satisfied

G39 N5	sbk Htp t p
- Dynasty: 16th Dynasty

Sekhemre Seusertawy Sobekhotep VIII was an ancient Egyptian ruler during the Second Intermediate Period whose exact chronological placement remains uncertain. He may have ruled over the Theban region in Upper Egypt. Scholars debate whether he belonged to the 13th, 16th, or 17th Dynasty. If Sobekhotep VIII was a king of the 16th Dynasty, it is thought that he is listed in the Turin Canon (11:2), which credits him with a 16-year reign.

== Reign ==
Almost nothing is known about Sekhemre Seusertawy Sobekhotep.

Reign length. His reign length lasted to the end of Year 4 as attested by the Inundation Stele, which is his only and highest attestation. The stela was dated to the very end of Year 4 just prior to Egyptian New Year (I Akhet 1) and he most likely continued to reign into his Year 5 based on this evidence. If he can be associated with Turin King List 11:2, then the list credits the ruler with 16 regnal years. However, a longer reign would suggest there would be more attestations of this ruler.

== Attestation ==
=== The Inundation Stela ===
The only contemporary attestation of Sobekhotep VIII is a stela found inside the third pylon at Karnak. This stela was used as construction material to fill the pylon during Amenhotep III's extensive works at the site. The stela is dated to the epagomenal, or final five days, of Sobekhotep VIII's fourth regnal year, and describes his attitude at a temple, probably that of Karnak, during a massive Nile flood:

(Life to) the son of Ra Sobekhotep, beloved of the great inundation, given life for ever. Year 4, fourth month of Shemu, the epagonal days, under the auspices of the person of this god, living for ever. His person went to the hall of this temple in order to see the great inundation. His person came to the hall of this temple which was full of water. Then his person waded there[...]

According to Egyptologist John Baines, who studied the stela in detail, by coming to the temple as it was flooded, the king reenacted the Egyptian story of the creation of the world in imitating the actions of the creator god Amun-Ra, to which the stela iconography closely associates the king, ordering the waters to recede from around the primordial mount.

=== Non-contemporary attestations ===
==== Karnak King List ====
The Karnak King List 43 (44) mentions Sekhemre Seusertawy (sḫm-rꜤ swsr-tꜢwi). He is listed between Merkawra (42 (45)) and a lost name (44 (43)).

==== Turin King List ====
The Turin King List does not mention Sekhemre Seusertawy. The list is heavily fragmented and many names have been lost. Some have speculated that he can be identified in Turin King List 11:2 as Sekhemre [...].

== Theories ==
=== Chronological position ===
==== A king of the 13th Dynasty ====
Egyptologists Jürgen von Beckerath and Labib Habachi considered Sobekhotep VIII to be a king of the 13th Dynasty.

==== A king of the 16th Dynasty ====
The Turin King List (11:2) reads: "The Dual King Sekhemra ... 16 years ...". Egyptologists Kim Ryholt and Darrell Baker assign this entry to Sekhemre Seusertawy, which is Sobekhotep VIII's nomen. If this identification is correct, then Sobekhotep VIII reigned for 16 years as the third king of the 16th Dynasty. This would make him the direct successor of Djehuti and the predecessor to Neferhotep III, although his relation to both of these kings remains unknown. In his reconstruction of the chronology of the Second Intermediate Period, Ryholt proposes that Sobekhotep VIII reigned from 1645 BC until 1629 BC, shortly after the Hyksos 15th Dynasty took over the Nile Delta and the city of Memphis, thereby precipitating the collapse of the 13th Dynasty.

Preceded by Djehuti	Pharaoh of Egypt; Sixteenth Dynasty of Egypt	Succeeded by Neferhotep III
