= Mersekhemre Ined =

Egyptian pharaoh

- Mersekhemre Neferhotep II?
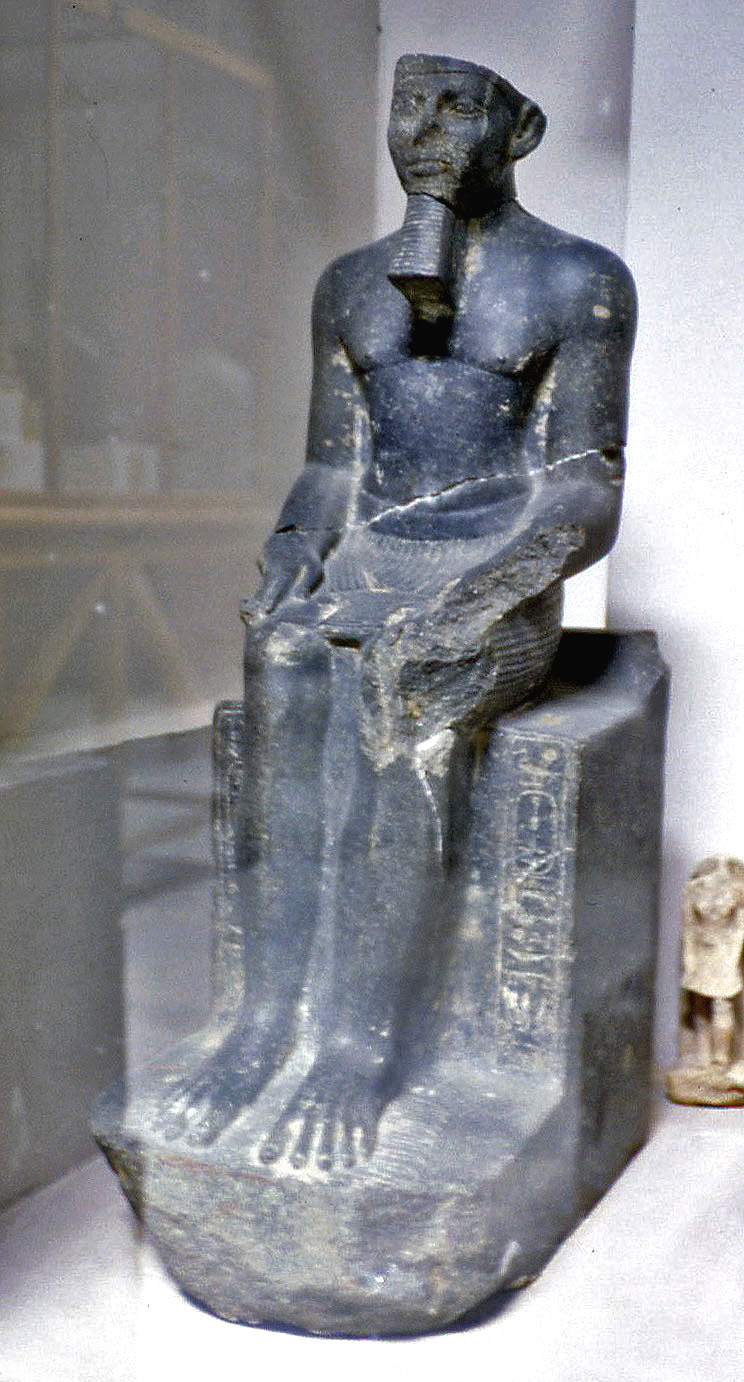
- Statue of Mersekhemre Neferhotep II, who could be the same person as Mersekhemre Ined. Discovered in the Karnak cachette, now on display in the Egyptian Museum, CG 42024.

Pharaoh
- Reign: 3 years, 1 to 4 months and 1 day (c. 17th century BC)
- Predecessor: Sankhenre Sewadjtu
- Successor: Sewadjkare Hori
Royal titulary
Praenomen
Mersekhemre
Mr-sḫm-Rˁ
He who loves the power of RaM23 t L2 t < ra U7 sxm >
Turin canon: Mersekhemre Ined
Mr.j-sḫm-Rˁ-ind
He who loves the power of Ra, InedM23 t L2 t < ra U7 r sxm Z1 i in n d wr >
Nomen
(if the same person as Neferhotep II) Neferhotep
Nfr-ḥtp
Perfect and content

G39 N5	nfr Htp t p
- Dynasty: 13th Dynasty

Mersekhemre Ined was a pharaoh of the late 13th Dynasty, possibly the thirty-fifth king of this dynasty. As such he would have reigned from Memphis over Middle and Upper Egypt for a short time either during the early or mid-17th century, from 1672 until 1669 BC or from 1651 until 1648 BC. He may be the same king as Mersekhemre Neferhotep II.

== Reign ==
The identity of Mersekhemre Ined with respect to Neferhotep II is still in doubt.

=== Mersekhemre Neferhotep ===
Two royal statues of a king named Mersekhemre Neferhotep were uncovered by Georges Legrain in 1903 in the Karnak Cachette and are now in the Egyptian Museum, CG 42023 and CG 42024.

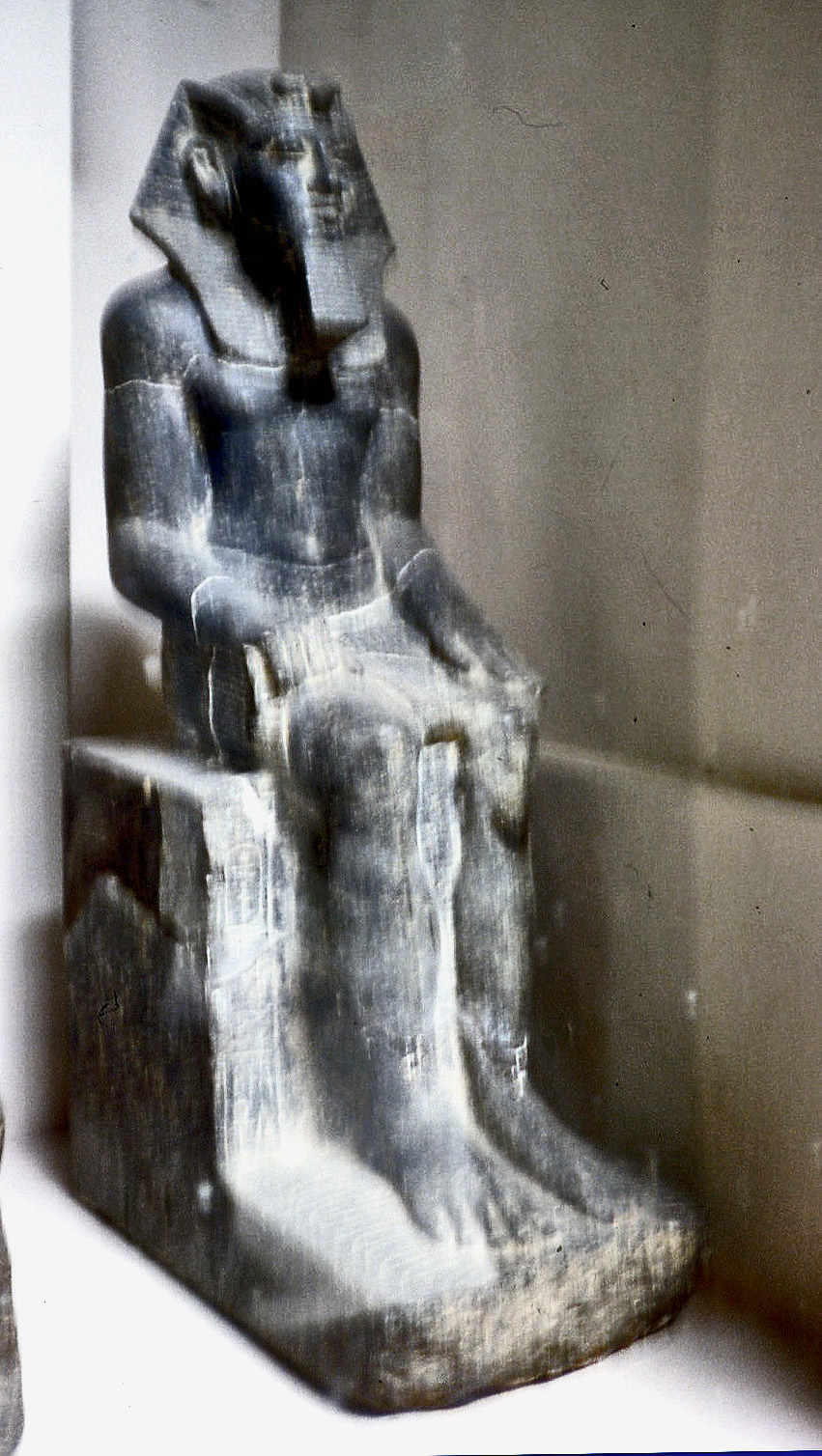
Statue CG 42023 of Mersekhemre Neferhotep II, possibly the same person as Mersekhemre Ined.

=== Non-contemporary attestation ===
According to the latest reading of the Turin canon by Kim Ryholt, Mersekhemre Ined reigned for 3 years, 1 to 4 months and 1 day.

== Theories ==
He likely ruled Middle and Upper Egypt while the Hyksos 14th or 15th Dynasty probably already controlled large parts of the Delta region during Mersekhemre Ined's time on the throne in the late 13th Dynasty.

Additionally, a king Mersekhemre Ined is mentioned in entry 7.6 of the Turin Canon and a king Mersekhemre appears in the Karnak king list, entry VI, 2. Egyptologists Jürgen von Beckerath, Detlef Franke, Jacques Kinnaer, Rolf Krauss and Donald B. Redford conclude that the Mersekhemre Ined of the Turin canon and Mersekhemre Neferhotep are one and the same person. In contrast, Kim Ryholt sees in these documents the references to two distinct rulers with the same official royal name, as for example in the case of Merhotepre Sobekhotep V and Merhotepre Ini. Rather, Ryholt identifies Neferhotep II with a king "Mer...re" on column 8 row 16 of the Turin canon, which would place Neferhotep II at the very end of the 13th Dynasty, possibly the dynasty's 46th ruler. However, this entry of the Turin canon may refer to Mershepsesre Ini II instead, with Neferhotep II being the same king as Mersekhemre Ined.

Preceded by Sankhenre Sewadjtu	Pharaoh of Egypt; Thirteenth Dynasty	Succeeded by Sewadjkare Hori
