= Turin King List =

Ancient Egyptian manuscript

- Created: c. 1245 BC
- Discovered: 1820; Thebes, Ottoman Egypt
- Discovered by: Bernardino Drovetti
- Present location: Turin, Piedmont, Italy

The Turin King List, also known as the Turin Royal Canon, is an ancient Egyptian hieratic papyrus thought to date from the reign of Pharaoh Ramesses II (r. 1279–1213 BC), now in the Museo Egizio (Egyptian Museum) in Turin. The papyrus is the most extensive list available of kings compiled by the ancient Egyptians, and is the basis for most Egyptian chronology before the reign of Ramesses II. The list records more than 200 kings, but not all names have survived.

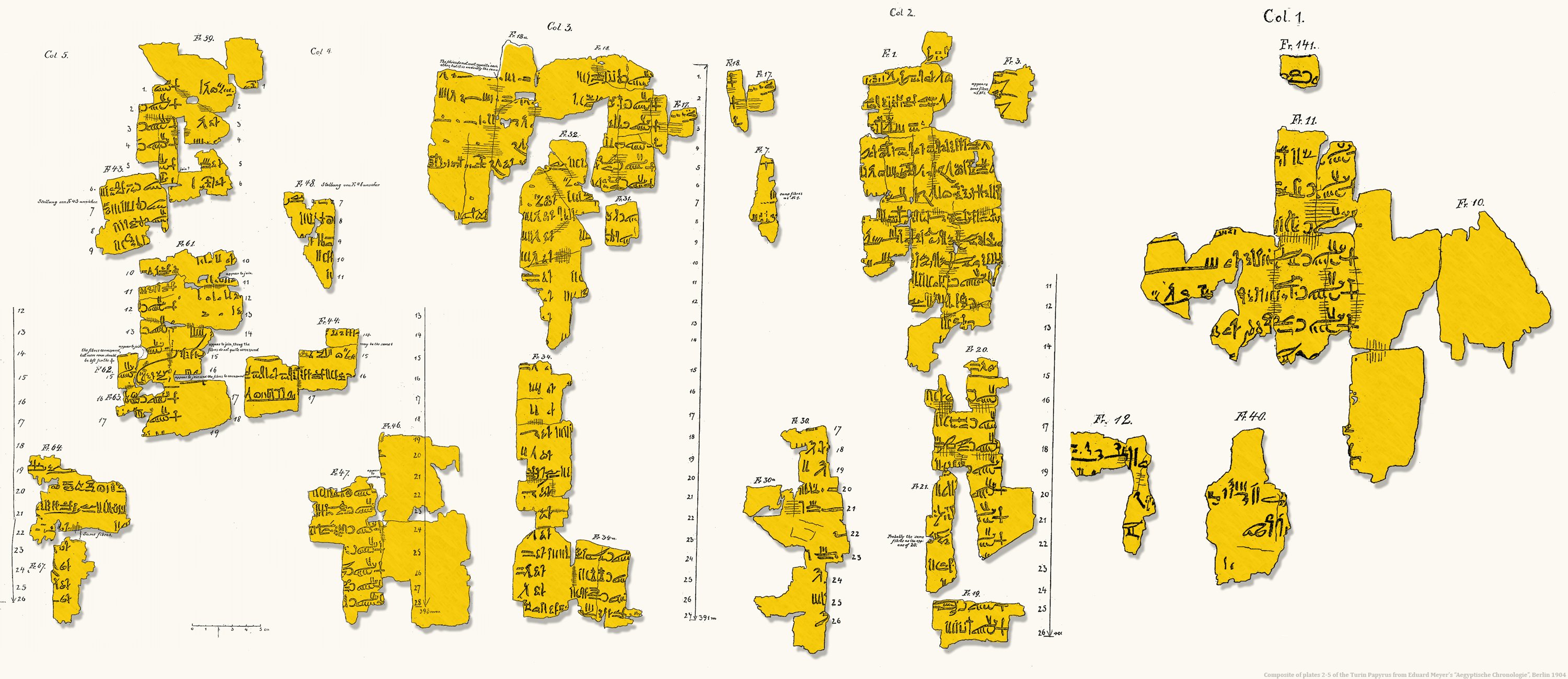
1904 version of attempt to assemble parts of the Turin King list

== Creation and use ==
The king-list is written on the reverse of a discarded tax register dating to the reign of Ramesses II, the third pharaoh of the 19th Dynasty, during the middle of the New Kingdom.

The beginning and ending of the list are now lost; there is no introduction, and the list does not continue after the 19th Dynasty. The composition may thus have occurred at any subsequent time, from the reign of Ramesses II to as late as the 20th Dynasty. The document itself is a sloppy copy of a much more detailed original, which is in turn based on much older sources. For example, only the pharaohs of the First and Second dynasties feature both their length of reign and age at death.

The papyrus lists the names of rulers, the lengths of reigns in years, with months and days for some kings. In some cases they are grouped together by family, which corresponds approximately to the dynasties of Manetho's Aegyptiaca. The list includes the names of ephemeral rulers or those ruling small territories that may be unmentioned in other sources.

The list also contains kings from the 15th Dynasty, the Hyksos who ruled Lower Egypt and the River Nile delta. The Hyksos rulers do not have cartouches (enclosing borders which indicate the name of a king), and a hieroglyphic sign is added to indicate that they were foreigners, although foreign rulers are not typically listed on King-lists.

The papyrus was originally a tax roll, but on its back is written a list of rulers of Egypt – including mythical kings such as gods, demi-gods, and spirits, as well as human kings. That the back of an older papyrus was used may indicate that the list was not of great formal importance to the writer, although the primary function of the list is thought to have been as an administrative aid. As such, the papyrus is less likely to be biased against certain rulers and is believed to include all the kings of Egypt known to its writers up to the 19th or 20th Dynasty.

== Discovery and reconstruction ==
=== Circumstances surrounding the discovery of the papyrus ===
The circumstances surrounding the discovery of the papyrus are no longer known, and there are many unclear points surrounding them; the archaeological context is lost. All we know is that the Italian traveler Bernardino Drovetti bought it c. 1818 in Thebes, Egypt. Purchased in Livorno in 1820, it was shipped to Genoa by sea and then overland to Turin in 1824. The 19th-century Egyptologist Gaston Maspero believed that Drovetti had unintentionally mutilated the papyrus during his journey.

It was acquired in 1824 by the Egyptian Museum in Turin, Italy and was designated Papyrus Number 1874. When the box in which it had been transported to Italy was unpacked, the list had disintegrated into small fragments. Jean-Francois Champollion, examining it, could recognize only some of the larger fragments containing royal names, and produced a drawing of what he could decipher. A reconstruction of the list was created to better understand it and to aid in research.

=== Research and processing ===
The Saxon researcher Gustav Seyffarth re-examined the fragments, some only one square centimeter in size, and made a more complete reconstruction of the papyrus based only on the papyrus fibers, as he could not yet determine the meaning of the hieratic characters. Subsequent work on the fragments was done by the Munich Egyptologist Jens Peter Lauth, which largely confirmed the Seyffarth reconstruction. Giulio Farina, the director of the Museo Egizio from 1928 to 1946 published his analysis and examination of this document in 1938 in a book called The Restored Papyrus of the Kings or Turin Canon; here, he proposed a new placement of some fragments, gave the hieroglyphic transcription of the hieratic text, the translation and an extensive historical-chronological commentary.

In 1997, prominent Egyptologist Kim Ryholt published a new and better interpretation of the list in his book The Political Situation in Egypt during the Second Intermediate Period. Egyptologist Donald Redford has also studied the papyrus and has noted that although many of the list's names correspond to monuments and other documents, there are some discrepancies and not all of the names correspond, questioning the absolute reliability of the document for pre-Ramesses II chronology.

Despite attempts at reconstruction, approximately 50% of the papyrus remains missing. This papyrus as presently constituted is 1.7 m long and 0.41 m wide, broken into over 160 fragments. In 2009, previously unpublished fragments were discovered in the storage room of the Egyptian Museum of Turin, in good condition. The fragments were found after studying a 1959 study by archaeologist Alan Gardiner. In his writing, Gardiner suggested that there were fragments in the museum that had not been used by scholars in reconstructing the document.

The name Hudjefa, found twice in the papyrus, is now known to have been used by the royal scribes of the Ramesside era during the 19th Dynasty, when the scribes compiled king lists such as the Saqqara King List and the royal canon of Turin and the name of a deceased pharaoh was unreadable, damaged, or completely erased.

== Contents of the papyrus ==
The papyrus is divided into eleven columns, distributed as follows. The names and positions of several kings are still being disputed, since the list is so badly damaged. Pharaohs that are known have the damaged part of the inscribed name in parentheses, if the damaged part is known.

- Column 1 – Gods of Ancient Egypt
- Column 2 – Gods of Ancient Egypt, spirits and mythical kings
- Column 3 – Rows 1–10 (Spirits and mythical kings), Rows 11–25 (Dynasties 1–2)
- Column 4 – Rows 1–25 (Dynasties 2–5)
- Column 5 – Rows 1–26 (Dynasties 6–8/9/10)
- Column 6 – Rows 12–25 (Dynasties 11–12)
- Column 7 – Rows 1–2 (Dynasties 12–13)
- Column 8 – Rows 1–23 (Dynasty 13)
- Column 9 – Rows 1–27 (Dynasty 13–14)
- Column 10 – Rows 1–30 (Dynasty 14)
- Column 11 – Rows 1–30 (Dynasties 14–17)

It's possible that a twelfth column once existed that contained Dynasties 18–19/20, but that section has since been lost.

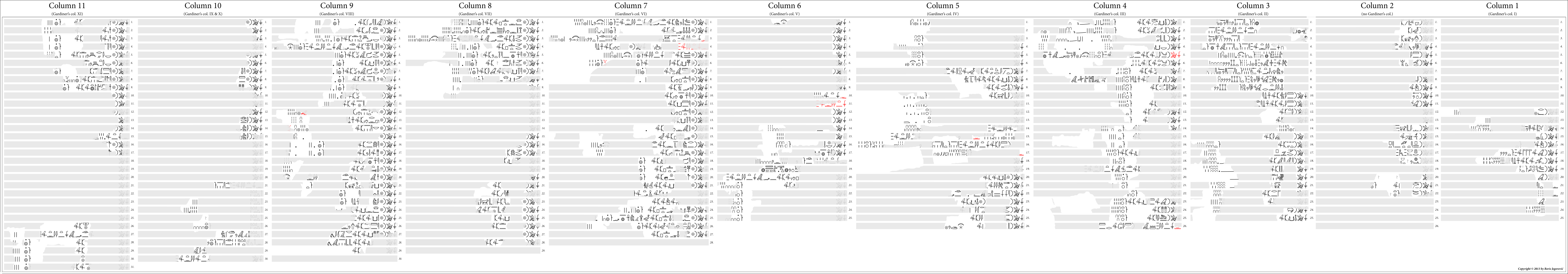
Turin King List with 2013 corrections of positions for some fragments – table representation of rows from the original papyrus, translated into hieroglyphs

The following are the names written on the papyrus, omitting the years.

Column 1
#	Modern name	Name in list	Hieroglyphs
1.	Names lost		
2.	Names lost		
3.	Names lost		
4.	Names lost		
5.	Names lost		
6.	Names lost		
7.	Names lost		
8.	Names lost		
9.	Names lost		
10.	Names lost		
11.	Names lost		
12.	Ra	Ra[…]	sw bit < r a ra HASH > HASH
13.	Name lost		
14.	Geb	Geb[…]	sw bit < xn b G7 aHa a W ra HASH > HASH
15.	Osiris	Usir[…]	sw bit < U40 ir HASH > HASH
16.	Set	Set[…]	sw bit < stX G7 Z1 HASH > HASH
17.	Horus	Hor Neter[…]	sw bit V10A G5 G7 nTrw G7
18.	Thoth	Djehuty	sw bit < t G26 y G7 > G7 anx DA s
19.	Maat	Maat	sw bit V10A U5 a Sw t H8 I12
20.	Horus the Elder	Hor[…]	sw bit < G5 HASH > HASH
21.	Summary of previous entries		
22.	Summary of previous entries		
23.	Summary of previous entries		
24.	Summary of previous entries		
25.	Name lost		
Column 2
#	Modern name	Name in list	Hieroglyphs
1.	Hab	Hab	sw bit < h A b Z5 > HASH
2.	Aped	Aped	sw bit < G39 Z1 > HASH
3.	Apis	Hepu	sw bit < E1 W Hp p > HASH
4.	Horus the Elder	Shemsu	sw bit < Y1V s W D54 > G7 ir n HASH
5.	He who endures	Meni[…]	sw bit < mn n i HASH > HASH
6.	Unknown	Wer[…]qa[…]	sw bit < wr r HASH q A28 HASH > HASH
7.	Name lost		
8.	Unknown	Af[…]	sw bit < i f HASH > HASH
9.	Set[…]	Set[…]	sw bit < stX G7 HASH > HASH
10.	Doctor[…]	Sunu[…]	sw bit < sXr nw W HASH > HASH
11.	Horus	Hor[…]	sw bit < G5 G7 HASH > HASH
12.	Names lost		
13.	Names lost		
14.	Does not thirst	Ni-ib[…]	sw bit < D35 i b E8 mw HASH > HASH
15.	Unknown	Nesensebk[…]sew[…]	sw bit < mr R12 Aa12 kfA Z5 G7 HASH > HASH
16.	Clods of the shore	Pensetensepet[…]	sw bit < p N35C s t ad t n s p t HASH > HASH
17.	Possessor of noble women	Her-hemut-shepsesut[…]	sw bit < Xr r N42 t A40s Z3A A50 Z3A HASH > HASH
18.	Protector of noble women	Khu-hemut-shepsesut[…]	sw bit < x D43 W QUERY N42 t A40s HASH > HASH
19.	Names lost		
20.	Names lost		
21.	Names lost		
22.	Sokar	Sokar[…]	sw bit < z k r Z5 HASH > G7
23.	Uraeus	Iaret[…]	sw bit < a r HASH > HASH
24.	Names lost		
25.	Names lost		
26.	Names lost		
Column 3	Names lost		
#	Modern name	Name in list	Hieroglyphs
1.	Name lost		
2.	Summary of previous entries		
3.	Summary of previous entries		
4.	Summary of previous entries		
5.	Names lost		
6.	Names lost		
7.	Names lost		
8.	Names lost		
9.	Names lost		
10.	Menes	Meni	sw bit < mn n i A2 > G7 anx DA s HASH
11.	Narmer	Meni	sw bit < mn n i y G7 > G7 anx DA s ir n HASH
12.	Hor-Aha	Iteti	sw bit < i t y > G7
13.	Names lost		
14.	Names lost		
15.	Djet	Itui	sw bit < HASH G4 i > tyw HASH
16.	Den	Qenti	sw bit < qn t y > G7 HASH
17.	Anedjib	Merygeregipen	sw bit < U7 r grg p n HASH > HASH
18.	Semerkhet	Semsem	sw bit < s m s m > G7 HASH
19.	Qa'a	[…]beh	sw bit < HASH b H > G7 HASH
20.	Hotepsekhemwy	[…]bau-hetepju	sw bit < HASH G30 Z1 mDAt Z2 > G7 HASH
21.	Nebra	[…]kau	sw bit < HASH mt E1 w > G7 HASH
22.	Nynetjer	[…]Netjerren	sw bit < HASH nTr r n > G7 HASH
23.	Wadjenes	[…]s	sw bit < HASH s > G7
24.	Senedj	Sened[…]	sw bit < snD HASH > HASH
25.	Neferkare I	Neferka	sw bit < nfr kA Z1 > G7
Column 4
#	Modern name	Name in list	Hieroglyphs
1.	Neferkasokar	Neferkasokar	sw bit < nfr kA Z1 z k r Z5 G7 > G7
2.	Hudjefa I	Hudjefa	sw bit < H D f A xn wr > G7
3.	Khasekhemwy	Bebti	sw bit < b b t y HASH > HASH
4.	Nebka	Nebka	sw bit < nb kA Z1 HASH > HASH
5.	Djoser (Note: Uniquely the Beginning nswt-bjt part of Djoser's name is written in red ink, no other name in the list is written with this)	Djoser[…]it	sw bit < Dsr r i t G7 > G7 ir n G7 f
6.	Sekhemkhet	Djoser[…]ti	sw bit < Dsr r t y G7 > G7
7.	Khaba	Hudjefa	sw bit < HASH xn wr G7 > G7
8.	Huni	Hu[…]	sw bit < H Z5 A25 HASH > G7 anx DA s
9.	Sneferu	Senefer	sw bit < s nfr f r > G7
10.	Names lost		
11.	Names lost		
12.	Khafre	[…]khaf[…]	sw bit < HASH xa Z1 G7 > G7
13.	Names lost		
14.	Names lost		
15.	Names lost		
16.	Names lost		
17.	Userkaf	[…]kaf	sw bit < HASH kA Z1 G7 > G7
18.	Names lost		
19.	Names lost		
20.	Names lost		
21.	Names lost		
22.	Names lost		
23.	Menkauhor Kaiu	Menkahor	sw bit < G5 G7 mn n kA Z1 G7 > G7
24.	Djedkare Isesi	Djedu	sw bit < dd dd > G7
25.	Unas	Unis	sw bit < wn n i s > G7
26.	Summary of previous entries		
Column 5
#	Modern name	Name in list	Hieroglyphs
1.	Names lost		
2.	Names lost		
3.	Names lost		
4.	Names lost		
5.	Names lost		
6.	Names lost		
7.	Netjerkare Siptah	Neitiqerty	sw bit < n t Z5 i q r t y G7 > G7 gb Z1 G7 p t H G7 ir n
8.	Neferkare Pepiseneb	Neferka Khered	sw bit < nfr kA Z1 G7 > G7 Xrd G7 s n D58s A1
9.	Neferkamin Anu	Nefer	sw bit < nfr f r G7 > G7
10.	Qakare Ibi	Ibi	sw bit < i b E8 > G7
11.	Names lost		
12.	Names lost		
13.	Names lost		
14.	Summary of previous entries		
15.	Summary of previous entries		
16.	Summary of previous entries		
17.	Summary of previous entries		
18.	Names lost		
19.	Names lost		
20.	Neferkare VII	Neferkare	sw bit < ra nfr kA Z1 G7 > G7
21.	Nebkaure Khety	Khety	sw bit < X t Spsi i i G7 > HASH
22.	Setut	Senenh[…]	sw bit V10A s M22 M22 n n A53 h A a HASH ir n f
23.	Neferkare Khety	[…]Neferkare	sw bit < HASH > HASH < ra nfr kA Z1 > G7
24.	Unknown	Mery[…] Khety[…]	sw bit < U7 r HASH X t ti i > G7 HASH
25.	Unknown	Shed[…]	sw bit < mH d HASH i i > G7
26.	Unknown	H[…]	sw bit < H HASH > G7
Column 6
#	Modern name	Name in list	Hieroglyphs
1.	Names lost		
2.	Names lost		
3.	Names lost		
4.	Names lost		
5.	Names lost		
6.	Names lost		
7.	Names lost		
8.	Names lost		
9.	Names lost		
10.	Summary of previous entries		
11.	Summary of previous entries		
12.	Names lost		
13.	Names lost		
14.	Intef II	[…]n[…]	sw bit HASH n HASH
15.	Name lost		
16.	Mentuhotep II	Nebhepet[…]re	sw bit < ra nb xrw HASH > HASH
17.	Mentuhotep III	Seankhka[…]	sw bit < s anx n x kA HASH > HASH
18.	Summary of previous entries		
19.	Summary of previous entries		
20.	Amenemhat I	[…]pib	sw bit < HASH p ib Z1 G7 > G7 n f m
21.	Senusret I	[…]ka	sw bit < HASH kA > G7
22.	Names lost		
23.	Names lost		
24.	Names lost		
25.	Names lost		
Column 7
#	Modern name	Name in list	Hieroglyphs
1.	Amenemhat IV	Maakherure	sw bit < ra U5 a xrw W A2 > G7 ir n f m
2.	Sobekneferu	Sobeknefrure	sw bit < ra nfr nfr nfr I5A G7 > G7
3.	Summary of previous entries		
4.	Summary of previous entries		
5.	Wegaf	Khutawire	sw bit < ra D43 N19 > G7 ir HASH
6.	Sekhemkare Amenemhat Senebef	Sekhemkare	sw bit < ra zSSt kA Z1 > G7 i HASH G7
7.	Sekhemkare	Amenemhat[…]re	sw bit V10A ra i mn n m HAt t Z1 G7 HASH
8.	Hotepibre	Sehetepibre	sw bit < ra s Htp t p ib Z1 > HASH
9.	Iufni	Iufeni	sw bit < i W f n&A1 > G7
10.	Amenemhat VI	Seankhibre	sw bit < ra s anx n x ib Z1 > G7 HASH
11.	Semenkare Nebnuni	Semenkare	sw bit < ra s mn n kA > G7 HASH
12.	Sehetepibre	Sehetepibre	sw bit < ra s Htp t p ib Z1 > HASH
13.	Sewadjkare	Sewadjkare	sw bit < ra s wAD kA > G7 HASH
14.	Nedjemibre	Nedjemibre	sw bit < ra nDm m mDAt ib HASH > G7
15.	Khaankhre Sobekhotep	Sebekhetepre	sw bit < ra I5A Htp t p > G7 gb HASH
16.	Renseneb	Renseneb	sw bit < r n A2 s n D58s mDAt > G7 ir n HASH
17.	Hor Awibre	Awibre	sw bit < ra Aw W t mDAt Z2 ib Z1 > G7
18.	Sedjefakare Kay Amenemhat VII	Sedjef[…]kare	sw bit < ra s D f HASH kA Z1 > G7
19.	Sekhemre Khutawy Sobekhotep	Amenemhatsebekhotep	sw bit < ra zSSt D43 N19 I5A Htp t p > G7
20.	Khendjer	User[…]re […]djer	sw bit < ra wsr HASH ra n Dr > G7
21.	Imyremeshaw	[…]kare	sw bit < ra HASH kA Z1 G7 > G7 m&r mSa
22.	Sehetepkare Intef	[…]ka Intef	sw bit < HASH kA > G7 ini&n t f G7
23.	Seth Meribre	[…]ibre Seth	sw bit < HASH ib Z1 G7 stX G7 > G7
24.	Sobekhotep III	Sekhemkare […]Sobekhotep	sw bit < ra zSSt kA HASH I5A Htp t p > G7
25.	Neferhotep I	Kha[…]re Neferhotep	sw bit < ra xa a HASH nfr Htp t p > G7 gb HA A A2 anx n x f
26.	Sihathor	Ra Sahathor	sw bit < ra Hwt t pr Hr Z1 t H_HASH G7 gb Z1 G7 > G7
27.	Sobekhotep IV	Kha[…]neferre Sobekhotep	sw bit < ra xa a HASH nfr I5A Htp t p > G7
28.	Name lost		
Column 8
#	Modern name	Name in list	Hieroglyphs
1.	Khahotepre Sobekhotep VI	Khaheteprehotep	sw bit < ra xa a mDAt Htp t p G7 > G7
2.	Wahibre Ibiau	Wahibreibiau	sw bit < ra sk H mDAt ib Z1 i a N35B mDAt A24 ib Z1 > G7
3.	Merneferre Ay	Merneferre	sw bit < ra U7 r nfr > G7 ir n f m
4.	Merhotepre Ini	Merhetepre	sw bit < ra U7 r Htp t p > G7
5.	Sankhenre Sewadjtu	Seankhenresewadjtu	sw bit < ra s anx n x n s wAD t W > G7
6.	Mersekhemre Ined	Mersekhemre Ined	sw bit < ra U7 r abA Z1 i bz n d wr > G7
7.	Sewadjkare Hori	Sewadjkare Hori	sw bit < ra s wAD kA Z1 G7 > G7 G5 i V11A G7
8.	Merkawre Sobekhotep	Merkawre Sobek[…]	sw bit < ra U7 r kA Z1 xa H_HASH I5A HASH > HASH
9.	Names lost		
10.	Names lost		
11.	Names lost		
12.	Names lost		
13.	Names lost		
14.	Names lost		
15.	Names lost		
16.	Unknown	[…]r[…]re	sw bit < ra H_HASH r HASH > HASH
17.	Merkheperre	Merkheperre	sw bit < ra U7 r xpr > HASH
18.	Merkare	Merka[…]	sw bit < HASH U7 r kA Z1 > HASH
19.	Names lost		
20.	Names lost		
21.	Names lost		
22.	Dedumose II	[…]mose	sw bit < HASH ms s Z5 > G7
23.	Unknown	[…]maat[…]re Ibi	sw bit < ra HASH t Sw > G7 i b E8 i A1
24.	Unknown	[…]webenre Hor	sw bit < ra HASH w b n ra > G7 G5 HASH
25.	Sekhemkare II	Se[…]kare	sw bit < ra HASH kA Z1 G7 > HASH
26.	Seheqenre Sankhptahi	[…]enre	sw bit < ra HASH mDAt n > G7 HASH
27.	Unknown	[…]re […]	sw bit < ra HASH > HASH
28.	Unknown	[…]en[…]	sw bit < HASH mDAt H_HASH G7 > G7 HASH
29.	Summary of previous entries		
Column 9
#	Modern name	Name in list	Hieroglyphs
1.	Nehesy	Nehesy	sw bit < ra a H s y qmA > G7
2.	Khakherewre	Khatyre	sw bit < ra xa a ti y > G7
3.	Nebefawre	Nebfaure	sw bit < ra nb Aw f W t mDAt Z2 > G7
4.	Sehebre	Sehabre	sw bit < ra s H b Hb ra > G7 ir n f m
5.	Merdjefare	Merdjefare	sw bit < ra U7 r D f A xn wr > G7
6.	Sewadjkare III	Sewadjkare	sw bit < ra s wAD kA Z1 > G7
7.	Nebdjefare	Nebdjefare	sw bit < ra ra nb D f A W xn wr > G7
8.	Webenre	Webenre	sw bit < ra W b n ra G7 > G7
9.	Name lost		
10.	Unknown	[…]djefare	sw bit < ra HASH xn wr > G7
11.	Unknown	[…]benre	sw bit < HASH b n ra G7 > G7 HASH
12.	Unknown	[…]autibre	sw bit < ra QUERY Aw W t mDAt Z2 ib Z1 > HASH
13.	Heribre	Heribre	sw bit < ra h r mDAt ib Z1 > G7 anx DA s HASH
14.	Nebsenre	Nebsenre	sw bit < ra nb s n Z2 > G7
15.	Unknown	[…]re […]	sw bit < ra HASH > HASH
16.	Sekheperenre	Sekheperenre	sw bit < ra s xpr r n > G7 HASH
17.	Djedkherure	Djedkherure	sw bit < ra dd G7 xrw W > G7 HASH
18.	Seankhibre	Seankhibre	sw bit < ra s anx n x ib Z1 > G7 HASH
19.	Unknown	Nefertem[…]re	sw bit < ra nfr t tm HASH G7 > G7 HASH
20.	Unknown	Sekhem[…]re	sw bit < ra sxm m HASH > G7 ir n HASH
21.	Kakaukemure	Ka[…]kemure	sw bit < ra kA mt E1 HASH km W t E1 > HASH
22.	Unknown	Neferib[…]re	sw bit < ra nfr ib HASH > HASH s
23.	Unknown	Dj[…]re	sw bit < ra i A2 HASH > HASH anx DA s
24.	Khakare	Khakare	sw bit < ra xa a mDAt kA Z1 G7 > HASH D44 HASH
25.	Aakare	Aakare	sw bit < ra O29V kA G7 > G7 ir n HASH
26.	Semenenre Hapu	Semenenre Hapu[…]	sw bit < ra s mn n r n > G7 Hp p W mDAt HASH
27.	Djedkare Nebnati	Djedkare Nebnati[…]	sw bit < ra dd dd kA Z1 G7 > G7 nb n n A ti i D54 HASH
28.	Bebnum	[…]ka[…] Bebnum	sw bit < HASH kA Z1 G7 > G7 b b n Z2 m D54 HASH
29.	Name lost		
Column 10
#	Modern name	Name in list	Hieroglyphs
1.	Unknown	[…]re […]	sw bit < ra HASH > HASH
2.	Names lost		
3.	Names lost		
4.	Names lost		
5.	Unknown	[…]re […]	sw bit < ra HASH > HASH
6.	Unknown	[…]re […]	sw bit < ra HASH > HASH
7.	Unknown	Senefer[…]re	sw bit < ra s nfr HASH > HASH
8.	Unknown	Men[…]re	sw bit < ra mn n HASH > HASH
9.	Unknown	[…]Djed[…]	sw bit < HASH dd dd HASH > HASH
10.	Names lost		
11.	Names lost		
12.	Names lost		
13.	Unknown	Inenek[…]	sw bit < i bz k n HASH > HASH
14.	Unknown	Ineb[…]	sw bit < i A2 nb HASH > HASH
15.	'Apepi	Ip[…]	sw bit < i A2 p HASH > HASH
16.	Names lost		
17.	Names lost		
18.	Names lost		
19.	Names lost		
20.	Names lost		
21.	Summary of previous entries		
22.	Names lost		
23.	Names lost		
24.	Names lost		
25.	Names lost		
26.	Names lost		
27.	Khamudi	Khamudi	HqA q xAst t Z1 xA A m W d y qmA A1
28.	Summary of previous entries		
29.	Names lost		
30.	Names lost		
Column 11
#	Modern name	Name in list	Hieroglyphs
1.	Sekhemre Sementawy Djehuty	Sekhem[…]re	sw bit < ra abA Z1 HASH > G7
2.	Sobekhotep VIII	Sekhem[…]re	sw bit < ra abA Z1 G7 HASH > G7 HASH
3.	Neferhotep III	Sekhemre S[…]	sw bit < ra abA Z1 G7 s HASH > G7
4.	Seankhenre Mentuhotepi	Sewadjen[…]re	sw bit < ra s wAD n H_HASH HASH > HASH
5.	Nebiryraw I	Nebiriaure	sw bit < ra nb i r y Aw W mDAt Z2 > G7
6.	Nebiryraw II	Nebiretaure[…]	sw bit < ra nb i t N17 Aw W mDAt Z2 HASH > HASH
7.	Semenre	Semenre	sw bit < ra s mn n DA mDAt Z2 > HASH
8.	Bebiankh	Seuserre[…]	sw bit < ra s wsr s r D40 mDAt Z2 > G7
9.	Sekhemre Shedwaset	Sekhemre Shedwaset	sw bit < ra abA Sd d A24 wAs t niwt G7 > G7
10.	Unknown	[…]re […]	sw bit < ra HASH > HASH
11.	Name lost		
12.	Unknown	[…]re […]	sw bit < ra HASH > HASH
13.	Names lost		
14.	Names lost		
15.	Summary of previous entries		
16.	Senebkay	Woser[…]re	sw bit < ra wsr r H_HASH HASH > HASH
17.	Unknown	[…]Woser[…]	sw bit < HASH wsr HASH > HASH
18.	Names lost		
19.	Names lost		
20.	Names lost		
21.	Names lost		
22.	Names lost		
23.	Names lost		
24.	Names lost		
25.	Names lost		
26.	Unknown	[…]hebre	sw bit < HASH Hb ra > G7
27.	Names lost		
28.	Names lost		
29.	Names lost		
30.	Unknown	[…]tere[…]	sw bit HASH t ra HASH
31.	Unknown	[…]nre	sw bit < HASH n ra G7 > G7 HASH

== Reconstructed list of historical kings ==
The following is a reconstructed list of kings, based on Ryholt's reconstruction.

Summary

Dynasty	Column		Kings		Heading		Summation	
Dynasties I–V	3.11	4.25	39 kings	39	"(Kings from the house of) Menes"	3.10	768 years[…]	4.26
Dynasties VI–VIII	5.1	5.13	13 kings	52	— none		187 years, 6 months, 3 days	5.14–15
					Summation of the first Seven dynasties		955 years, 0 months, 15 days	5.16–17
Dynasty IX/X	5.18	6.9	18 kings	70	— none		lost	6.10
Dynasty XI	6.12	6.17	6 kings	76	"Kings (from Mentuhotep II)"	6.11	143 years[…]	6.18
Dynasty XII	6.20	7.2	8 kings	84	"Kings of the Residence Itj-tawy"	6.19	213 years, 1 month, 17 days	7.3
Dynasty XIII	7.5	8.27	51 kings	135	"Kings after the children (?) of Sehotepibra"	7.4	lost	8.28
Dynasty XIV	8.29	10.20	51 kings	186	— none		lost	10.21
Dynasty XV	10.23	10.28	6 kings	192	"Kings from foreign lands", i.e. Hyksos	10.22	140–190 years	10.29
Dynasty XVI	10.31	11.14	15 kings	207	lost heading	10.30	lost	11.15
Abydene (?)	11.16	11.31	16 kings	223	— none		lost	

The Turin King List probably recorded at least 26 additional names: 9 kings of Dynasty XVII, 15 kings of Dynasty XVIII, and the first 3 of Dynasty XIX; all in all totaling 250 kings. However, there are some instances of lacunae, that is, notes left by the scribes whenever they encountered ilegible names in their sources. There are also two instances of fictitious pharaohs, both in Dynasty IV (likely corresponding to Manetho's Bikheris and Thamphthis).

Ryholt estimates that the lacunae represent at least 12 missing kings: six for Dynasty XIII, and at least six for Dynasty XIV. In addition, there is a lacuna in Column 5.15 that very likely corresponds to Manetho's Dynasty VII, consisting of 10 additional kings recorded only in the Abydos King List. The second lacuna in Dynasty XIV is especially problematic, as it may include other rulers known otherwise only from scarab seals. All in all, there are about 270 kings beginning with Narmer/Menes down to Ramesses II, in a period of roughly 1800 years.

Dynasties I–V

#	C	Name in list		Pharaoh	Reign	Lifespan
-	3.10	"[Kings beginning with] Meni […] "				
1	3.11	Meni	𓏠𓈖𓇋	Narmer	Lost	Lost
2	3.12	Iteti	𓏏𓏏𓇋𓏭	Aha	Lost	Lost
3	3.13-4	Iti	𓇋𓏏[…]𓅆	Djer	[…] 10+ months, 28 days	Lost
4	3.15	Itui	[…]𓅂𓇋	Djet	Lost	Lost
5	3.16	Qenti	𓐖𓏏𓏭	Den	Lost	Lost
6	3.17	Merigeregepen	𓌻𓂋𓍅𓊪𓈖[…]	Anedjib	Lost	74 years
7	3.18	Semsem	𓋴𓅓𓋴𓅓	Semerkhet	Lost	72 years
8	3.19	[…]beh	[…]𓃀𓎛𓅆	Qa'a	Lost	63 years
9	3.20	[…]bau-hetepju	[…]𓅢𓊵𓊪𓅆	Hotepsekhemwy	Lost	95 years
10	3.21	[…]kau	[…]𓃓𓂸𓏤𓏤𓏤𓅆	Nebra	Lost	Lost
11	3.22	Banetjer	[…]𓊹𓂋𓈖𓅆	Nynetjer	Lost	95 years
12	3.23	[…]s	[…] […]𓋴𓅆	Wadjnes	Lost	70 years
13	3.24	Sened[…]	𓅾[…]	Senedj	Lost	54 years
14	3.25	Neferka	𓄤𓂓𓏤	Neferkara I	Lost	70 years
15	4.1	Neferkasokar	𓄤𓂓𓏤𓊃𓎡𓂋𓏯𓅆	Neferkasokar	8 years, 3 months, […] days	10–30 years
16	4.2	Hudjefa	𓊃𓆓𓋴	Hudjefa ("lost")	11 years, 8 months, 4 days	34 years
17	4.3	Bebti	𓃀𓃀𓈅𓅆	Khasekhemwy	27 years, 2 months, 1 day	40 years
18	4.4	Nebka	𓎟𓂓𓏤	Nebka	19 years […]	Lost
19	4.5	Djoserit	𓂦𓂋𓇋𓏏𓅆	Djoser	19 years and 1 month	Lifetime […]
20	4.6	Djoserti	𓂦𓂋𓏏𓏭𓅆	Sekhemkhet	6 years, […] months […]	Not included
21	4.7	Hudjefa	𓊃𓆓𓋴	Hudjefa II	6 years, […] months […]	Not included
22	4.8	Hu[…]	𓎛𓏯𓀝[…]𓅆	Huni	24 years	Not included
23	4.9	Snefer[…]	𓋴𓄤𓆑𓂋𓅆	Sneferu	24 years	Not included
24	4.10	Lost		Khufu	23 years […]	Not included
25	4.11	Lost		Djedefre	8 years […]	Not included
26	4.12	Khaf[…]	[…]𓈍𓆑[…]𓅆	Khafre	Lost	Not included
27	4.13	Lost		Baufra (?	Lost	Not included
28	4.14	Lost		Menkaure	28 years […]	Not included
29	4.15	Lost		Shepseskaf	4 years […]	Not included
30	4.16	Lost		Thamphthis (?	28 years […]	Not included
31	4.17	[…]kaf	[…] […]𓂓𓆑𓅆	Userkaf	7 years […]	Not included
32	4.18	Lost		Sahure	12 years […]	Not included
33	4.19	Lost		Neferirkare Kakai	Lost	Not included
34	4.20	Lost		Shepseskare	7 years[…]	Not included
35	4.21	Lost		Neferefre	Lost	Not included
36	4.22	Lost		Nyuserre Ini	10+ years[…]	Not included
37	4.23	Menkahor	𓅃𓅆𓏠𓈖𓂓𓏤𓅆	Menkauhor Kaiu	8 years […]	Not included
38	4.24	Djedu	𓊽𓊽	Djedkare Isesi	28 years […]	Not included
39	4.25	Unis	𓃹𓈖𓇋𓋴	Unas	30 years […]	Not included
-	4.26	"Total of the (39) kings beginning with Meni down to Unas, their years: 768 (years) […]"				

Dynasties VI–VIII

#	C	Name in list		Pharaoh	Reign
40	5.1	Lost		Teti	[…] years, 6 months, 21 days
41	5.2	Lost		Userkare	Lost
42	5.3	Lost		Pepi I	20 years […]
43	5.4	Lost		Nemtyemsaf I	44 years […]
44	5.5	Lost		Pepi II	90+ years[…]
45	5.6	Lost		Nemtyemsaf II	1 year, 1 month
46	5.7	Neitiqerty	𓈖𓏏𓏯𓇋𓈎𓂋𓏏𓏭𓅆	Neitiqerty Siptah	Lost
47	5.8	Neferka Khered	𓄤𓂓𓏤𓅆	Neferkare Pepiseneb	Lost
48	5.9	Nefer	𓄤𓆑𓂋𓅆	Neferkamin Anu	Lost
49	5.10	Ibi	𓇋𓃀𓃙	Qakare Ibi	2 years, 1 month, 1 day
50	5.11	Lost		Neferkaure	4 years, 2 months, 0 days
51	5.12	Lost		Neferkauhor	2 years, 1 month, 1 day
52	5.13	Lost		Neferirkare	1 year and half month
-	5.14	Total of [13 kings from Teti] until Neferirkare amounting to 181 years, 6 months, 3 days, and a lacuna of 6 years. Total: 187 years […] […]			
-	5.15	Total of [13 kings from Teti] until Neferirkare amounting to 181 years, 6 months, 3 days, and a lacuna of 6 years. Total: 187 years […] […]			
-	5.16	From Meni[…] 949 years, 0 months, 15 days, and a lacuna of 6 years			
-	5.17	Total: [From Meni, 52] kings amounting to 955 years, 0 months and 15 days			

Dynasty IX/X

#	C	Name in list		Pharaoh	Reign
53	5.18	Lost		Khety I ?	Lost
54	5.19	Lost		unknown	Lost
55	5.20	Neferkara	𓇳𓄤𓂓𓏤𓅆	Neferkare VII	Lost
56	5.21	Kheti	𓄡𓏏𓀻𓇌𓅆	Khety II	Lost
57	5.22	S[…]tut-ha[…]	𓋴𓇒𓈖𓈖𓀾𓉔 […]	Setut	Lost
58	5.23	Neferkara […]	𓇳𓄤𓂓𓏤𓅆	unknown	Lost
59	5.24	Mery[…] Khety […]	𓌻𓂋 […]	unknown	Lost
60	5.25	Shed[…]	𓄞𓂧 […]	unknown	Lost
61	5.26	H[…] […]	𓎛 […]	unknown	Lost
62	6.1	Lost		unknown	Lost
63	6.2	Lost		unknown	Lost
64	6.3	Lost		unknown	Lost
65	6.4	Lost		unknown	Lost
66	6.5	Lost		unknown	Lost
67	6.6	Lost		Meryhathor?	Lost
68	6.7	Lost		Neferkare VIII?	Lost
69	6.8	Lost		Khety III?	Lost
70	6.9	Lost		Merikare?	Lost
-	6.10	Total: 18 kings […]			

Dynasty XI

#	C	Name in list		Pharaoh	Reign
-	6.11	The kings of […]			
71	6.12	Lost		Mentuhotep I	16 years
72	6.13	Lost		Intef I	16 years
73	6.14	Lost		Intef II	49 years
74	6.15	Lost		Intef III	8 years
75	6.16	Nebhapetra	𓇳𓎟𓊤	Mentuhotep II	51 years
76	6.17	Sankhka(ra)	𓋴𓋹𓈖𓐍𓂓	Mentuhotep III	12 years
-	6.18	(lacuna)		(Mentuhotep IV)	(7 years)
-	6.18	Total: 6 kings amounting to 136 years and a lacuna of 7 years; Total: 143 years […]			

Dynasty XII

#	C	Name in list		Pharaoh	Reign
-	6.19	Kings of the Residence Itj-tawy […]			
77	6.20	[…]pi[…]	[…]𓊪𓄣𓏤𓅆	Amenemhat I	29 years […]
78	6.21	[…]ka[…]	[…]𓂓𓏤	Senusret I	45 years […]
79	6.22	Lost		Amenemhat II	30+ years […]
80	6.23	Lost		Senusret II	19 years (?) […]
81	6.24	Lost		Senusret III	30+ years […]
82	6.25	Lost		Amenemhat III	40+ years […]
83	7.1	Maakherura	𓇳𓌷𓂝𓊤𓍢𓀁	Amenemhat IV	9 years, 3 months, 27 days
84	7.2	Sobekneferura	𓇳𓄤𓄤𓄤𓆊𓅆	Sobekneferu ♀	3 years, 10 months, 24 days
-	7.3	Total of kings of the Residence Itj-tawy: 8 kings who ruled 213 years, 1 month and 17 days			

Dynasty XIII

#	C	Name in list		Pharaoh	Reign
-	7.4	Kings after the children of Sehotepibra (?)			
85	7.5	Khutawyra	𓇳𓂤𓈃	Wegaf / Sobekhotep	2 years, 3 months, 24 days
86	7.6	Sekhemkare	𓇳𓏣𓂓𓏤	Senebef	[…] years […]
86	7.6	lacuna		Nerikare	6 years […]
87	7.7	Amenemhat	𓇳𓏠𓅓𓄂𓏏𓏤𓅆	Sekhemkare Amenemhat V	3 years […]
87	7.7	(lacuna?)		Ameny Qemau	?
88	7.8	Sehotepibra	𓇳𓋴𓊵𓏏𓊪𓄣𓏤	Hotepibre	1 […]
89	7.9	Iufni	𓇋𓏲𓆑𓈖𓀀	Iufni	Lost
90	7.10	Sankhibra	𓇳𓋴𓋹𓈖𓐍𓄣𓏤	Amenemhat VI	[…] and 23 days
91	7.11	Semenkara	𓇳𓋴𓏠𓈖𓂓	Nebnuni	[…] and 22 days
92	7.12	Sehotepibra	𓇳𓋴𓊵𓏏𓊪𓄣𓏤	Sehetepibre	1+ months and 27 days
93	7.13	Sewadjkara	𓇳𓋴𓇅𓂓	Sewadjkare	[…] and 21+ days
94	7.14	Nedjemibra	𓇳𓇛𓅓𓏛𓄣	Nedjemibre	7 months
95	7.15	Sobek[hot]ep	𓇳𓆍𓊵𓏏𓊪	Sobekhotep II/I	Lost
96	7.16	Ren[se]neb	𓂋𓈖𓀁𓋴𓈖𓃀𓏛	Renseneb	4 months
97	7.17	Awtibra	𓇳𓄫𓏲𓏏𓏛𓏥𓄣𓏤	Awibre Hor	[…] and 7 days
97	7.17	(lacuna?)		Khabaw, Djedkheperew	?
98	7.18	Sedjef[a]kara	𓇳𓋴𓆓𓆑[…]𓂓𓏤	Amenemhat VII	Lost
99	7.19	Sekhemra Khutawy Sobekhotep	𓇳𓏣𓂤𓈃𓆍𓊵𓏏𓊪	Wegaf / Sobekhotep	Lost
100	7.20	User[ka]ra Khendjer	𓇳𓄊[…]𓏤𓇳𓈖𓇥𓂋	Khendjer	Lost
101	7.21	[Smenkh]kara Imyremeshaw	𓇳[…]𓂓𓅆 𓅗𓀎	Smenkhkare	[…] and 4 days
102	7.22	[Sehotep]ka[ra] Intef	[…]𓂓𓏤𓅆𓏎𓈖𓏏𓆑	Intef IV	[…] and 3 days
103	7.23	[Mer]ibra Seth	[…]𓄣𓏤𓅆𓁣𓅆	Seth Meribre	[…] and 6 days
104	7.24	Sekhemkara […] Sobekhotep	𓇳𓈍𓂝𓏛[…]𓄤𓊵𓏏𓊪	Sobekhotep III	4 years, 2 months […] days
105	7.25	Kha[sekhem]ra Neferhotep	𓇳𓈍𓂝[…]𓄤𓊵𓏏𓊪	Neferhotep I	11 years, 1 month […] days
106	7.26	Sihathor	𓇳𓉗𓏏𓉐𓅃𓅆𓅬𓏤𓅆	Sihathor	1+ months and 3 days
107	7.27	Kha[…]neferra Sobekhotep	𓇳𓈍𓂝[…]𓏛𓄤𓆊𓊵𓏏𓊪	Sobekhotep IV	Lost
108	7.28	Lost	[…]	Sobekhotep V	Lost
109	8.1	Khahoteprahotep	𓇳𓈍𓂝𓏛𓊵𓏏𓊪𓅆	Sobekhotep VI	4 years, 8 months, 29 days
110	8.2	Wahibra Jaib	𓇳𓎝𓎛𓏛𓄣𓏤𓇋𓈗𓏛𓀜𓄣𓏤	Wahibre Ibiau	10 years, 8 months, 28 days
111	8.3	Merneferra	𓇳𓌻𓂋𓄤	Merneferre Ay I	23 years, 8 months, 18 days
112	8.4	Merhotepra	𓇳𓌸𓊵𓏏𓊪	Ini	2 years, 2–4 months, 9 days
113	8.5	Sankhenra Sewadjtu	𓇳𓋴𓋹𓈖𓐍𓈖𓋴𓇅𓏏𓏲	Sewadjtu	3 years and 2–4 months
114	8.6	Mersekhemra Ined	𓇳𓌻𓂋𓌂𓏤𓇋𓆛𓈖𓂧𓅨	Ined	3 years, 1 month, 1 [day]
115	8.7	Sewadjkara Hori	𓇳𓋴𓇅𓋳𓏤𓅆𓅃𓇋	Hori	5 years, […] and 8 days
116	8.8	Merkau[ra] Sobek[hotep]	𓇳𓌻𓂋𓏤𓂓𓏤[…]𓆊[…]	Sobekhotep VII	2 years, […] and 4 days
117	8.9	Name lost	[…]	Unknown	[…] and 11 days
118	8.10	Name lost	[…]	Unknown	Lost
119	8.11	Name lost	[…]	Unknown	Lost
120	8.12	Name lost	[…]	Unknown	Lost
121	8.13	Name lost	[…]	Unknown	Lost
122	8.14	Name lost	[…]	Unknown	Lost
123	8.15	Mer[…]ra[…]	𓇳[…]𓂋[…]	Unknown	Lost
124	8.16	Merkheperra	𓇳𓌻𓂋𓆣	Merkheperre	Lost
125	8.17	Merka[ra]	[…]𓌻[…]𓂓𓏤	Merkare	Lost
126	8.18	Name lost	[…]	Unknown	Lost
127	8.19	Name lost	[…]	Unknown	Lost
128	8.20	[…]dj[…]	[…]𓆓[…]	Unknown	Lost
129	8.21	[…]mes[…]	[…]𓄟𓋴𓏯	Unknown	Lost
130	8.22	[…]maatra Ibi […]	𓇳[…]𓏏𓆄𓅆𓇋𓃙𓇋𓀀	Unknown	Lost
131	8.23	[…]webenra Hor […]	𓇳[…]𓅱𓃀𓈖𓇳𓅆𓅃	Unknown	Lost
132	8.24	Se[…]kara	𓇳[…]𓂓𓏤𓅆	Sekhemkare II?	Lost
133	8.25	[…]qaenra […]	𓇳[…]𓈎𓏛𓈖	Sankhptahi?	Lost
134	8.26	[…]ra […]	𓇳[…]	Unknown	Lost
135	8.27	[…]enra […]	𓇳[…]𓏛𓈖[…]	Unknown	Lost
-	8.28	"[…] (Total of 51) kings "[…]			

Dynasty XIV

#	C	Name in list		Reign
136	8.29	Lost line (possibly a name or lacuna)		
137	9.1	Nehesy	𓅘𓎛𓋴𓏭𓌙	0 years, x months, 3 days.
138	9.2	Khakherewre	𓇳𓈍𓂝𓏛𓍘𓏭	3 […] (?)
139	9.3	Nebefawre	𓇳𓎟𓆑𓄫𓏲𓏏𓏛𓏥	1 year, 5 months, 15 days
140	9.4	Sehebre	𓇳𓋴𓎛𓃀𓎱𓇳	3 years, x months, 1 day
141	9.5	Merdjefare	𓇳𓌻𓂋𓅰𓅯𓅪	3–4 years […]
142	9.6	Sewadjkare III	𓇳𓋴𓇅𓂓𓏤	1 year […]
143	9.7	Nebdjefare	𓇳𓇳𓎟𓆓𓆑𓅰𓏲𓅯𓅪	1 year […]
144	9.8	Webenre	𓇳𓏲𓃀𓈖𓇳	0 years, x months […]
145	9.9	lost		1 year […]
146	9.10	[…]djefara	𓇳[…]𓅯𓅪	0 years, 4 months[…]
147	9.11	[…]webenra	[…]𓃀𓈖𓇳	0 years, 3 months[…]
148	9.12	[…]awibra	𓇳[…]𓄫𓏲𓏏𓏛𓏥𓄣𓏤	[…] […] and 18 days
149	9.13	Heribre	𓇳𓉔𓂋𓏛𓄣𓏤	[…] […] and 29 days
150	9.14	Nebsenre	𓇳𓎟𓋴𓈖𓏥	[…] 5 months, 20 days[…] lacuna
151	9.15	lost		[…] […] […] […] and 21 days
152	9.16	Sekheperenre	𓇳𓋴𓆣𓂋𓈖	0 years, 2 months, 1–5 days
153	9.17	Djedkherure	𓇳𓊽𓅆𓊤𓏲	0 years, 2 months, 5 days
154	9.18	Seankhibre	𓇳𓋴𓋹𓈖𓐍𓄣𓏤	[…] […] […] […] and 19 days
155	9.19	Nefertum[…]ra	𓇳𓄤𓏏𓍃[…]	[…] […] […] […]. and 18 days
156	9.20	Sekhem[…]ra	𓇳𓌂𓅓[…]	[…] […] […] months (?)
157	9.21	Kakemura	𓇳𓂓𓂸𓃒[…]𓆎𓏲𓏏𓃒	(1) year (?)
158	9.22	Neferibra	𓇳𓄤𓄣[…]	x years
159	9.23	I[…]ra	𓇳𓇋𓀁[…]	x years
160	9.24	Khakare	𓇳𓈍𓂝𓏛[…]	lost
161	9.25	Aakare	𓇳𓉻𓂓[…]	lost
162	9.26	Semenenre Hapu[…]	𓇳𓋴𓏠𓈖[…]	lost
163	9.27	Djedkare Nebnati	[…]𓂓𓏤𓅆𓅆𓎟𓈖𓈖𓄿𓍘𓇋𓀀	lost
164	9.28	Babnum […]ka	[…]𓂓𓏤𓅆𓅆𓃀𓃀𓈖𓏥𓅓𓀀	lost
165	9.29	Eight lines lost		
166	9.30	Eight lines lost		
167	10.1	Eight lines lost		
168	10.2	Eight lines lost		
169	10.3	Eight lines lost		
170	10.4	Eight lines lost		
171	10.5	Eight lines lost		
172	10.6	Eight lines lost		
173	10.7	Senefer[…]ra	𓇳𓋴𓄤[…]	lost
174	10.8	Men[…]ra	𓇳𓏠𓈖[…]	lost
175	10.9	Djed[…]ra	𓊽𓊽[…]	lost
176	10.10	Three lines lost		
177	10.11	Three lines lost		
178	10.12	Three lines lost		
179	10.13	Ink[…]	𓇋𓆛𓈖𓂓[…]	lost
180	10.14	'A[…]	𓇋𓀀𓎟[…]	lost
181	10.15	'Ap[epi]	𓇋𓀀𓊪[…]	lost
182	10.16	Five lines lost		
183	10.17	Five lines lost		
184	10.18	Five lines lost		
185	10.19	Five lines lost		
186	10.20	Five lines lost		
-	10.21	(Total: 51 kings) have reigned […] years […]		

Dynasty XV

#	C	Name in list		Reign
-	10.22	(Heading of the Hyksos dynasty)		
187	10.23	lost		
188	10.24	lost		
189	10.25	lost		
190	10.26	lost		[…] 10+ years
191	10.27	lost		[…] 40+ years
192	10.28	Khamudi	𓆼𓄿𓅓𓏲𓂧𓏭𓌙	lost
-	10.29	Total: 6 Hyskos who ruled for (140–190) years		

Dynasty XVI

#	C	Name in list		Pharaoh	Reign
-	10.30	(Heading of the Sixteenth dynasty)			
193	10.31	lost			
194	11.1	Sekhemra […]	𓇳𓌂𓏤[…]	Djehuty	3 years […]
195	11.2	Sekhemra […]	𓇳𓌂𓏤𓅆[…]	Sobekhotep VIII	16 (years) […]
196	11.3	Sekhemra S[…]	𓇳𓌂𓏤𓅆𓋴[…]	Neferhotep III	1 year […]
197	11.4	Se[…]en[…]ra […]	𓇳𓋴𓇅𓈖[…]	Mentuhotepi	1 year […]
198	11.5	Nebiriawra	𓇳𓎟𓇋𓂋𓏭𓄫𓏲𓏛𓏥	Nebiryraw I	26 years […]
199	11.6	Nebitawra […]	𓇳𓎟𓇋𓏏𓇿𓄫𓏲𓏛𓏥[…]	Nebiryraw II	Lost
200	11.7	Semenra	𓇳𓋴𓏠𓈖𓍖𓏛𓏤	Semenre	Lost
201	11.8	Seuserenra	𓇳𓋴𓄊𓋴𓂋𓂝	Bebiankh	12 years […]
202	11.9	Sekhemra Shedwaset	𓇳𓌂𓄞𓂧𓀜𓋆𓏏𓊖𓅆	Shedwaset	Lost
203	11.10	[…]ra	𓇳[…]	Unknown	Lost
204	11.11	lost			
205	11.12	[…]ra […]	𓇳[…]	Unknown	Lost
206	11.13	lost			
207	11.14	lost			
-	11.15	Total: [1]5 kings […]			

Abydos Dynasty (?)

#	C	Name in list		Pharaoh	Reign
208	11.16	User[…]ra […]	𓇳𓄊𓂋[…]	Senebkay ?	Lost
209	11.17	User[…]	𓄊𓏤[…]	Unknown	3 years […]
210	11.18	8 lines lost			
211	11.19	8 lines lost			
212	11.20	8 lines lost			
213	11.21	8 lines lost			
214	11.22	8 lines lost			
215	11.23	8 lines lost			
216	11.24	8 lines lost			
217	11.25	8 lines lost			
218	11.26	[…]hebra […]	𓇳𓎱𓏤[…]	Unknown	Lost
219	11.27	3 names lost			2 (years)
220	11.28	3 names lost			2 years […]
221	11.29	3 names lost			4 years […]
222	11.30	[…]tera […]	𓇳𓏏𓏤[…]	Unknown	3 years […]
223	11.31	[…]nra	𓇳𓈖𓅆𓏤[…]	Unknown	3 years […]

== See also ==
- List of ancient Egyptian papyri
- Lists of ancient kings
- List of pharaohs
- Palermo Stone (An older fragmented king list)
- Abydos King List (A contemporary king list)

== Sources ==
=== Bibliography ===
- Farina, Giulio (1938). Il Papiro Dei Re, restaurato. G. Bardi. or
- Farina, Giulio (2019) [1938]. Papyrus Of Kings Restored. Translated by Peter Lundström. or The Papyrus of the Kings Restored PDF in English
- Gardiner, Alan H. (1957). The Royal canon of Turin. Oxford: Griffith Inst. ISBN 978-0-900416-48-4.
- von Beckerath, J. (1995). "Some Remarks on Helck's 'Anmerkungen zum Turiner Königspapyrus'". The Journal of Egyptian Archaeology. 81: 225–227. doi:10.2307/3821822. JSTOR 3821822.
- Beckerath, J. V. (1962). "The Date of the End of the Old Kingdom of Egypt". Journal of Near Eastern Studies. 21 (2): 140–147. doi:10.1086/371680. S2CID 161488411.
- Bennett, Chris (2002). "A Genealogical Chronology of the Seventeenth Dynasty". Journal of the American Research Center in Egypt. 39: 123–155. doi:10.2307/40001152. JSTOR 40001152.
- Kitchen, Kenneth A. (2001). "King Lists". In Redford, Donald B. (ed.). The Oxford Encyclopedia of Ancient Egypt. Vol. 2. American University in Cairo Press. pp. 234–238. ISBN 978-977-424-581-7.
- Bunson, Margaret (2002). "Turin Canon". Encyclopedia of ancient Egypt. New York: Facts on File. p. 413. ISBN 978-0-8160-4563-1.
- Ryholt, Kim (1997). The Political Situation in Egypt During the Second Intermediate Period, C. 1800-1550 B.C. Museum Tusculanum Press. ISBN 978-87-7289-421-8.
- Ryholt, Kim (2005). "The Turin King-List". Ägypten und Levante (in German). 1 (XIV): 135–156. doi:10.1553/AEundL14s135. ISSN 1015-5104.
- Málek, Jaromír (1982). "The Original Version of the Royal Canon of Turin". The Journal of Egyptian Archaeology. 68: 93–106. doi:10.2307/3821628. ISSN 0307-5133.
- Spalinger, Anthony (2001). "The Political Situation in Egypt during the Second Intermediate Period, c. 1800-1550 B. C. K. S. B. Ryholt". Journal of Near Eastern Studies. 60 (4): 296–300. doi:10.1086/468961. ISSN 0022-2968.

=== Online sources ===
- Description and Translation (History → Turin Kinglist) in Ancient-Egypt.org, by Jacques Kinnaer, MA in Egyptology, based on Gardiner's transcriptions.
- Turin King List, in Narmer.pl (Ancient Egypt History & Chronology), based on Gardiner, Farina and Malek
- Turin Kinglist, by Ian Mladjov, MA, BA and Ph.D. in History, based on Ryholt
- Royal Canon of Turin, in Pharaoh.se, using Gardiner and Farina
- Hieroglyphs with translation including Ryholt's new placement of fragments.
- Turin King List - Collezione Museo Egizio
