= Nehesy =

Egyptian pharaoh

- Nehesi, Nehsy, Nehasi
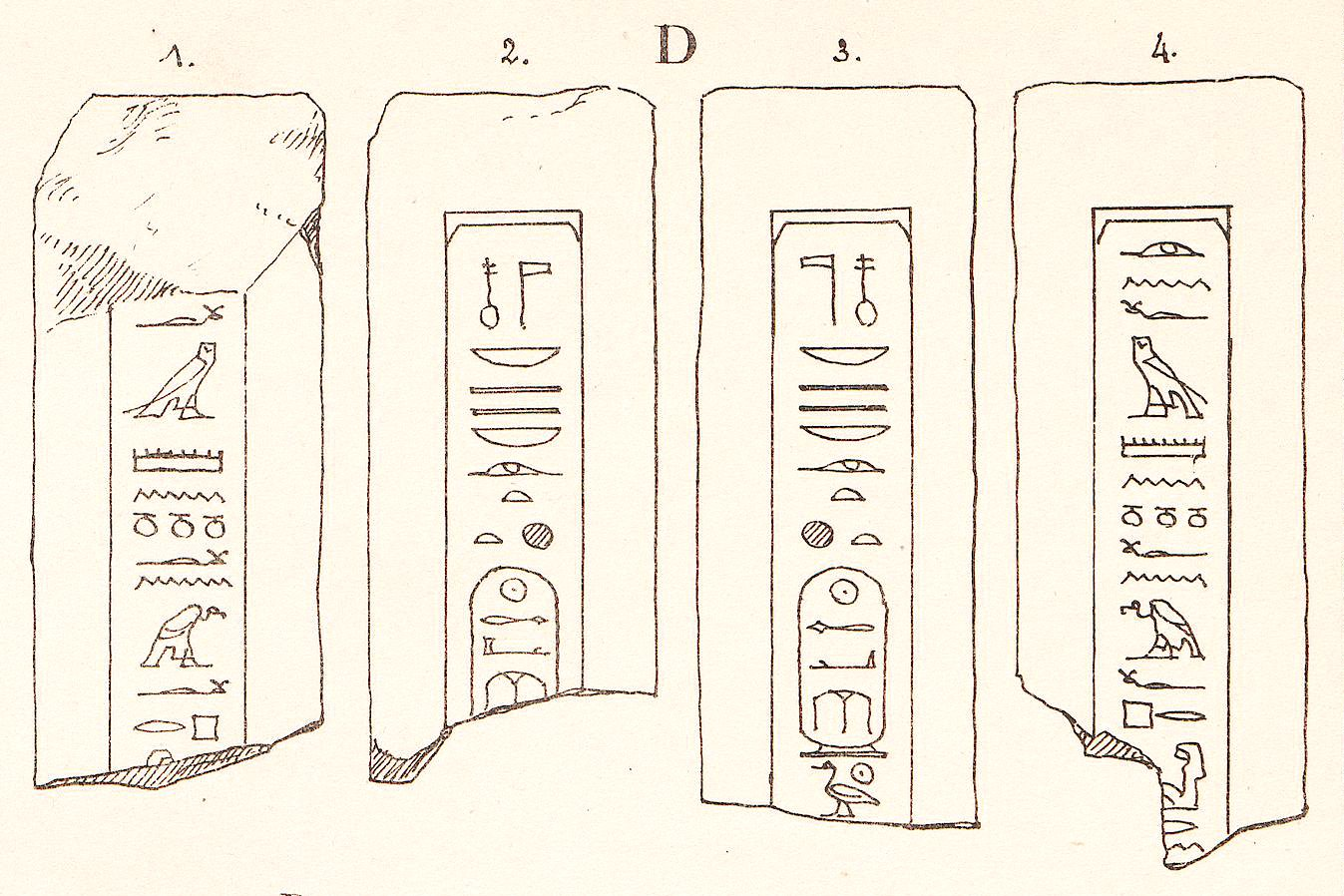
- Four sides of an obelisk of King Nehesy found at Tanis. The inscription reads "The Perfect God, Lord of the Two Lands, Master of the Cultus, ꜤAꜣ-sḥ-reꜥ, Son of Re, [Nehsy]. He made it as a monument for his mother P[t]r making(?) for [her a...]"

Pharaoh
- Reign: 0 years, x months and 3 days c. 1705 BC
- Predecessor: uncertain, Sheshi (Ryholt)
- Successor: uncertain, Khakherewre
Royal titulary
Prenomen
Aasehre
ˁ3-sḥ-Rˁ
The Hall of Council of Ra is great
R8 F35 < ra aA a O22 >
Nomen
Nehesy
Nḥsj
The Nubian
G39 N5 < nH H s y >
Turin canon
Nḥsj
The Nubian
< nH H s y T14 >
- Father: uncertain, Sheshi (Ryholt)
- Mother: uncertain, Tati (Ryholt)
- Dynasty: 14th dynasty

Nehesy Aasehre (Nehesi) was a ruler of Lower Egypt during the fragmented Second Intermediate Period. He is placed by most scholars into the early 14th Dynasty, as either the second or the sixth pharaoh of this dynasty. As such he is considered to have reigned for a short time c. 1705 BC and would have ruled from Avaris over the eastern Nile Delta. Recent evidence makes it possible that a second person with this name, a son of a Hyksos king, lived at a slightly later time during the late 15th Dynasty c. 1580 BC. It is possible that most of the artefacts attributed to the king Nehesy mentioned in the Turin canon, in fact belong to this Hyksos prince.

== Family ==
In his review of the Second Intermediate Period, egyptologist Kim Ryholt proposed that Nehesy was the son and direct successor of the pharaoh Sheshi with a Nubian Queen named Tati. Egyptologist Darrell Baker, who also shares this opinion, posits that Tati must have been Nubian or of Nubian descent, hence Nehesy's name meaning The Nubian. Being related to Sheshi who is believed to have a Canaanite origin, Nehesy is also believed to be of Canaanite descent.

Four scarabs found, including one from Semna in Nubia and three of unknown provenance, point to a temporary coregency with his father. Furthermore, one scarab mentions Nehesy as King's son and a further 22 as Eldest king son. Ryholt and Baker thus hold the view that Nehesy became the heir to the throne after the death of his elder brother, Prince Ipqu.

Manfred Bietak and Jürgen von Beckerath believe that Nehesy was the second ruler of the 14th dynasty. Bietak further posits that his father was an Egyptian military officer or administrator, who funded an independent kingdom centered on Avaris. The kingdom controlled the northeastern Nile Delta, at the expense of the concurrent 13th dynasty.

== Reign ==
According to the Austrian Egyptologist Manfred Bietak, Nehesy's 14th Dynasty kingdom started during the late 13th Dynasty, around or just after 1710 BC, as a result of the slow disintegration of the 13th Dynasty. After this event, "no single ruler was able to control the whole of Egypt" until Ahmose I captured Avaris. Alternatively, Ryholt believes that the 14th dynasty started a century before Nehesy's reign, c. 1805 BC during Sobekneferu's reign. Since the 13th dynasty was the direct continuation of the 12th, he proposes that the birth of the 14th is the origin of the distinction between the 12th and the 13th in the Egyptian tradition.

Nehesy's authority may have "encompassed the eastern Delta from Tell el-Muqdam to Tel Habuwa (where his name occurs), but the universal practise of usurpation and quarrying of earlier monuments complicates the picture. Given that the only examples that were certainly found at the sites where they once stood are those from Tell el-Habua and Tell el-Daba, his kingdom may actually have been much smaller."

After Nehesy's death, the 14th dynasty continued to rule in the Delta region of Lower Egypt with a number of ephemeral or short-lived rulers until 1650 BC when the Hyksos 15th Dynasty conquered the Delta. Nehesy seems to have been remembered long after his death as several locations in the eastern Delta bore names such as "The mansion of Pinehsy" and "The Place of the Asiatic Pinehsy", Pinehsy being a late Egyptian rendering of Nehesy.

== Attestation ==
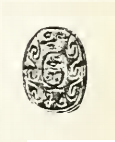
Scarab of Nehesy, now in the Petrie Museum.

In spite of a very short reign of around a year, Nehesy is the best attested ruler of the 14th dynasty. The name Nehesy appears with different titles "King's Son", "Senior/Eldest King's Son" or "King". The name Nehesy may also be written in different variations. Thus, monuments may belong to a single individual or three different individuals. Most items are found in the Nile Delta region in Lower Egypt.

=== Lower Egypt ===
Nehesy is attested by numerous contemporary artefacts, foremost among which are scarab seals. In addition, a fragmentary obelisk from the Temple of Seth in Raahu bears his name together with the inscription "king's eldest son".

==== Tell el-Dab'a (Avaris) ====
Nehesy is also attested by two relief fragments inscribed with the names of the king, which were unearthed in Tell el-Dab'a in the mid 1980s.

==== Tell Habuwa (Tjaru) ====
Two further stelae are known from Tell-Habuwa (ancient Tjaru): one bearing Nehesy's birth name, the other one the throne of the king Aahsere. Thanks to these stelae it was possible to connect the name Nehesy with the throne name Aahsere ˁ3-sḥ-Rˁ. Before this discovery, Aasehre was regarded as a Hyksos king.

In 2005, a further stele of Nehesy was discovered in the fortress city of Tjaru, once the starting point of the Way of Horus, the major road leading out of Egypt into Canaan. The stele shows a king's son Nehesy offering oil to the god Banebdjedet and also bears an inscription mentioning the king's sister Tany. A woman with this name and title is known from other sources around the time of the Hyksos king Apophis, who ruled at the end of the Second Intermediate Period c. 1580 BC. Daphna Ben-Tor, who studied the scarabs of Nehesy, concludes that those referring to the king's son Nehesy are different in style from those referring to Nehesy as a king. She thus wonders whether the king's son Nehesy might be a different person from the better known king of the same name. In this situation, king Nehesy would still be an early 14th Dynasty ruler, but some of the attestations attributed to him would in fact belong to a Hyksos prince.

==== Tell el Muqdam ====
At Tell el Muqdam, in a secondary archaeological context, a seated statue may have belonged to Nehesy and inscribed with "Seth, Lord of Avaris", indicating it original location.^{(Item ID?)} The statue was later usurped by Merneptah of the 19th Dynasty. It may have ended up in Tanis during the 21st Dynasty when monuments were moved from Pi-Ramesse (Avaris).

=== Non-Contemporary Attestations ===
==== Turin King List ====
The Turin King List 9:01 mentions "The Dual King Nehesy reigned 0 years, x months, 3 days". This column does not start with a "heading" introducing a new dynasty or sequence of kings, and he is succeeded in this list by an unknown Khatira (9:02), where "ti" (Hieroglyph U33) is believed to be a misspelling for hrw (Hieroglyph P8), rendering the name as "Khakherura". In any case, the list suggests that Nehesy did not rule a full year. According to Ryholt's latest reading of the Turin canon, Nehesy is attested there on the 1st entry of the 9th column (Gardiner, entry 8.1) and is the first king of the 14th dynasty whose name is preserved on this king list.

== See also ==
- List of pharaohs

Preceded by Sheshi	Pharaoh of Egypt; Fourteenth Dynasty	Succeeded by Khakherewre
