= Nomen (ancient Egypt) =

One of the pharaoh's five names

Nomen in hieroglyphs
G39 N5
sˁ-Rˁ
Sa-Rê
Son of Rê
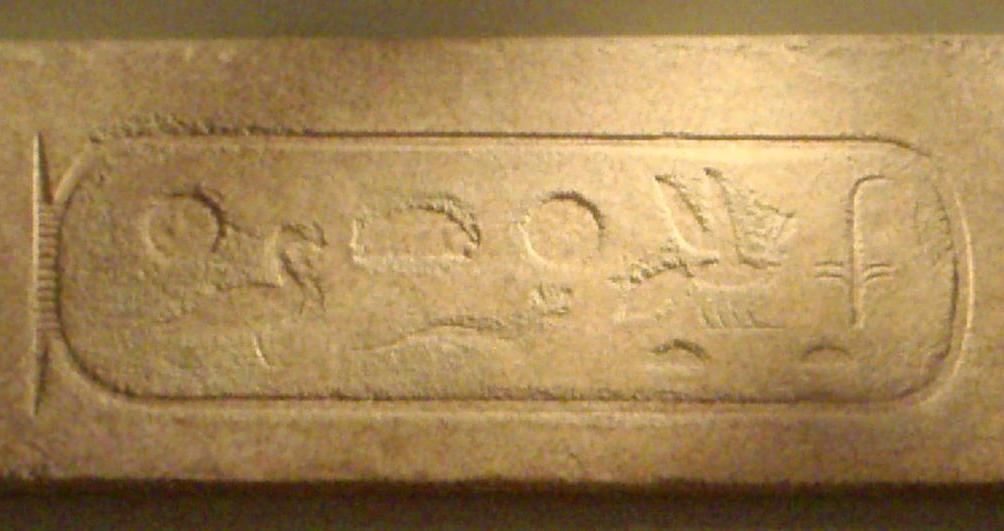
- Cartouche name of king Khafra with the Niswt-Bity name and the Sa-Rê title inside

The nomen of ancient Egyptian pharaohs was one of the "great five names". It was introduced by king Djedefre, third pharaoh of the 4th Dynasty, as an emendation to the traditional nswt-bity crest. The nomen was later separated from the prenomen to become an independent royal name.

== Heraldic appearance ==
The title Sa-Rê, literally meaning "Son of Ra", was written with the sign of a sun-disc and that of a goose placed below. At the beginning, the sun and goose signs were placed at the end of the cartouche containing the name of the king. This was read as: "King of Lower- and Upper Egypt, king XXX, son of Râ". Later it was placed before the cartouche, introducing the nomen of the king and now read as: "Son of Râ, king XXX". The hieroglyphs forming the nomen itself were placed inside the cartouche.

== Symbology ==
Under the reign of the Fourth Dynasty king Djedefre, the cult of the sun-god Ra reached a new peak. Egyptian pharaohs now believed that they were the actual sons of Ra, since Ra himself had just become the greatest of all gods. This would later change and Ra merged symbolically with the god Amun.

== Introduction and history ==
The earliest known use of the Sa-Rê title occurs during the reign of king Djedefre, third ruler of 4th Dynasty and successor of Khufu. The earliest traces of a sun-cult in Ancient Egypt, then concentrating on the sun as a celestial object, appear during the 2nd Dynasty (c. 2890–c. 2686 BC), possibly under its second ruler, king Raneb. In particular Raneb was the first pharaoh to use the symbol of the sun as a part of his Horus name. The rise in importance of the cult of the sun god is first manifested during the reign of Peribsen in the mid 2nd Dynasty, who placed the sun-disc above the figure of the god Seth. Later, under king Djoser, the founder of the 3rd Dynasty, we find the first personal names of princes and high officials connected to Râ.

This evolution reached a new high when King Djedefre placed the god Ra above all other gods, viewing himself as the son of Râ in persona. At this time however, the title of "Son of Ra", Sa-Rê, was only a mere emendation of the nswt-bity crest (meaning both "He of the Sedge and the Bee" and "King of Upper and Lower Egypt"), the traditional form for introducing the name of the ruler. Thus, at these early times in Egyptian history, nomen and prenomen were most likely one and the same name. It is only from the later Middle Kingdom period (c. 2055–1650 BC) onwards that the mention "Sa-Rê" was placed, together with the niswt-bity title, before the cartouche containing the name of the king. In the intervening time, king Neferirkare Kakai, the third ruler of 5th Dynasty (c. 2490–2345 BC), was the first who separated the nswt-bity and Sa-rê titles and turned them into two different, independent names, which are now called the prenomen and the nomen, respectively. The title Sa-Rê was used to introduce this new name of the king and thus became a new "Great name".

After the Middle Kingdom pharaohs often used both their prenomen and nomen in separate cartouches, which sometimes led to confusion amongst Egyptologists. The reason for the confusion derives from differences between the royal names presented by the ancient Historian Manetho, who wrote a history of Egypt in the 3rd century BC, and the older Egyptian kinglists, such as the Abydos King List, the Saqqara Tablet and the Turin Canon, which date to the Ramesside period (c. 1292–1189 BC). Whilst Manetho gives Hellenized versions of the nomen of the kings, the Ramesside lists only use the prenomen. It is therefore difficult to discern which nomen belongs with which prenomen. In addition, many rulers of later periods used the cartouche-versions of their nomen and prenomen separately in inscriptions. Thus, it is only in inscriptions that give both names side by side that these can be securely associated with any given king.
