= 17th century BC =

One hundred years, from 1700 BC to 1601 BC

The 17th century BC was the century that lasted from 1700 BC to 1601 BC.

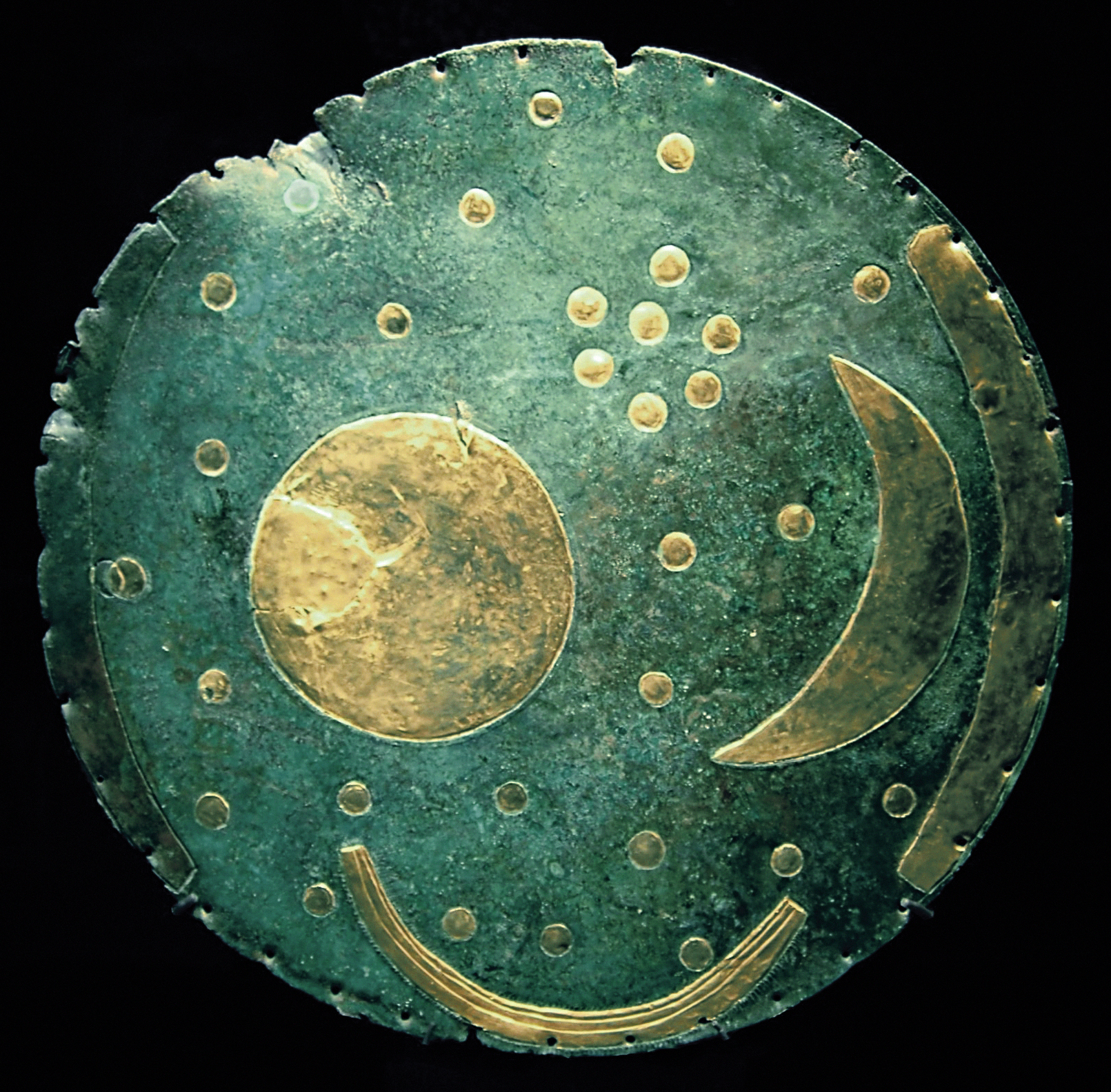
Nebra sky disk, central Europe 1600 BC. The inlaid gold depicted the crescent moon and the Pleiades star cluster in a specific arrangement forming the earliest known depiction of celestial phenomena.

== Events ==
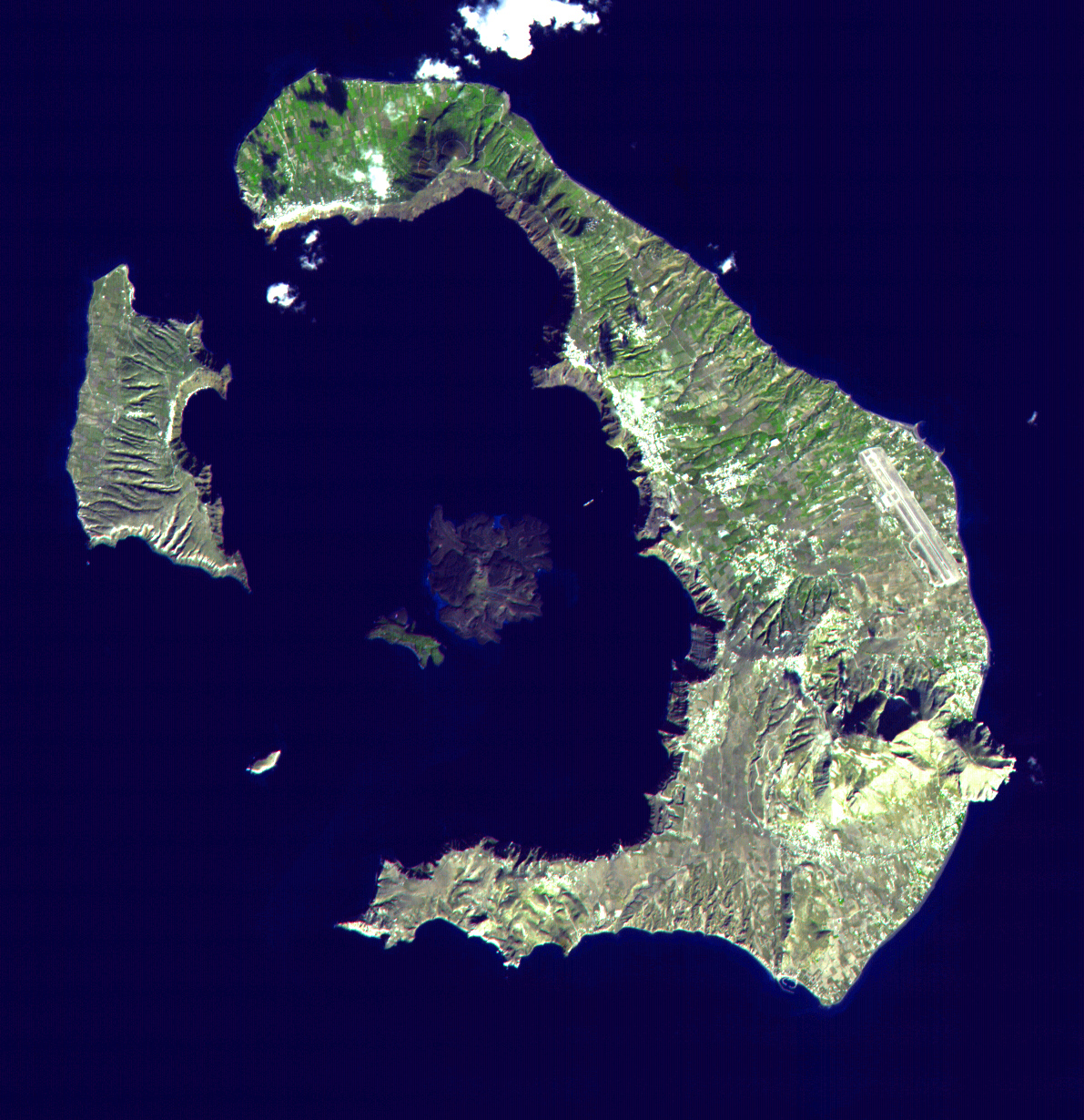
Satellite image of Thera, centre location of the Minoan eruption, one possible source of 17th century BC climatic disturbances

- c. 1700 BC: Indus Valley Civilisation comes to an end but is continued by the Cemetery H culture.
- 1700 BC: Belu-bani became the King of Assyria.
- c. 1700 BC: Minoan Old Palace period ends and Minoan Second Palace period starts in Crete.
- c. 1700 BC: beginning of the Late Minoan period on Crete.
- c. 1700 BC: Aegean metalworkers are producing decorative objects rivaling those of Ancient Near East jewelers, whose techniques they seem to borrow.
- c. 1700 BC: Lila-Ir-Tash started to rule the Elamite Empire.
- c. 1700 BC: 1450 BC: Young girl gathering saffron crocus flowers, detail of wall painting, Room 3 of House Xeste 3, Akrotiri (prehistoric city), Thera, is made. Second Palace period. It is now kept in Thera Foundation, Petros M. Nomikos, Greece.
- c. 1700 BC: Bronze Age starts in China.
- c. 1698 BC: Lila-Ir-Tash the ruler of the Elamite Empire died. Temti-Agun I started to rule the Elamite Empire.
- 1691 BC: Belu-bani, the King of Assyria died.
- c. 1690 BC: Temti-Agun I, the ruler of the Elamite Empire, died. Tan-Uli started to rule the Elamite Empire.
- 1690 BC: Libaia became the King of Assyria.
- c. 1680 BC: Egypt: Development of leavened bread (date approximate).
- c. 1673 BC: Sharma-Adad I became the King of Assyria.
- c. 1661 BC: Iptar-Sin became the King of Assyria.
- c. 1655 BC: Tan-Uli, the ruler of the Elamite Empire, died.
- c. 1650 BC: Collapse of the 14th Dynasty of Egypt.
- c. 1650 BC: Conquest of Memphis by the Hyksos and collapse of the 13th Dynasty of Egypt.
- c. 1650 BC: Start of the 15th (Hyksos) and 16th Dynasties of Egypt.
- c. 1650 BC: Possibly, start of the Abydos Dynasty in Upper Egypt.
- c. 1646 BC or earlier: Jie of Xia is overthrown by Tang of Shang (ca. 1675-1646 BC) in the Battle of Mingtiao.
- 1649 BC: Bazaia became the King of Assyria.
- 1633 BC – May 2 – Lunar Saros 34 begins.
- 1627 BC: Beginning of a cooling of world climate lasting several years recorded in tree-rings all over the world. It may have been caused by one, or more, volcanic eruptions e.g. the Minoan eruption of Thera, the Avellino eruption of Mount Vesuvius, and/or the eruption of Mount Aniakchak in Alaska.
- 1625 BC: Samsu-Ditana becomes King of Babylon (middle chronology).
- 1621 BC: Lullaia becomes the King of Assyria.
- 1620 BC: Mursili I becomes King of the Hittite Empire (middle chronology).
- 1615 BC: Shu-Ninua became the King of Assyria.
- c. 1600 BC: Tang of Shang established the Shang dynasty.

== Deaths ==
- 1684 BC – Heremon, Irish legend

== Extinctions ==
- The last known population of woolly mammoth, preserved on Wrangel Island, becomes extinct.

== Sovereign states ==
See: List of sovereign states in the 17th century BC.
