= Yanassi =

Hyksos prince of the Fifteenth Dynasty

- Yanassy, Yansas-aden
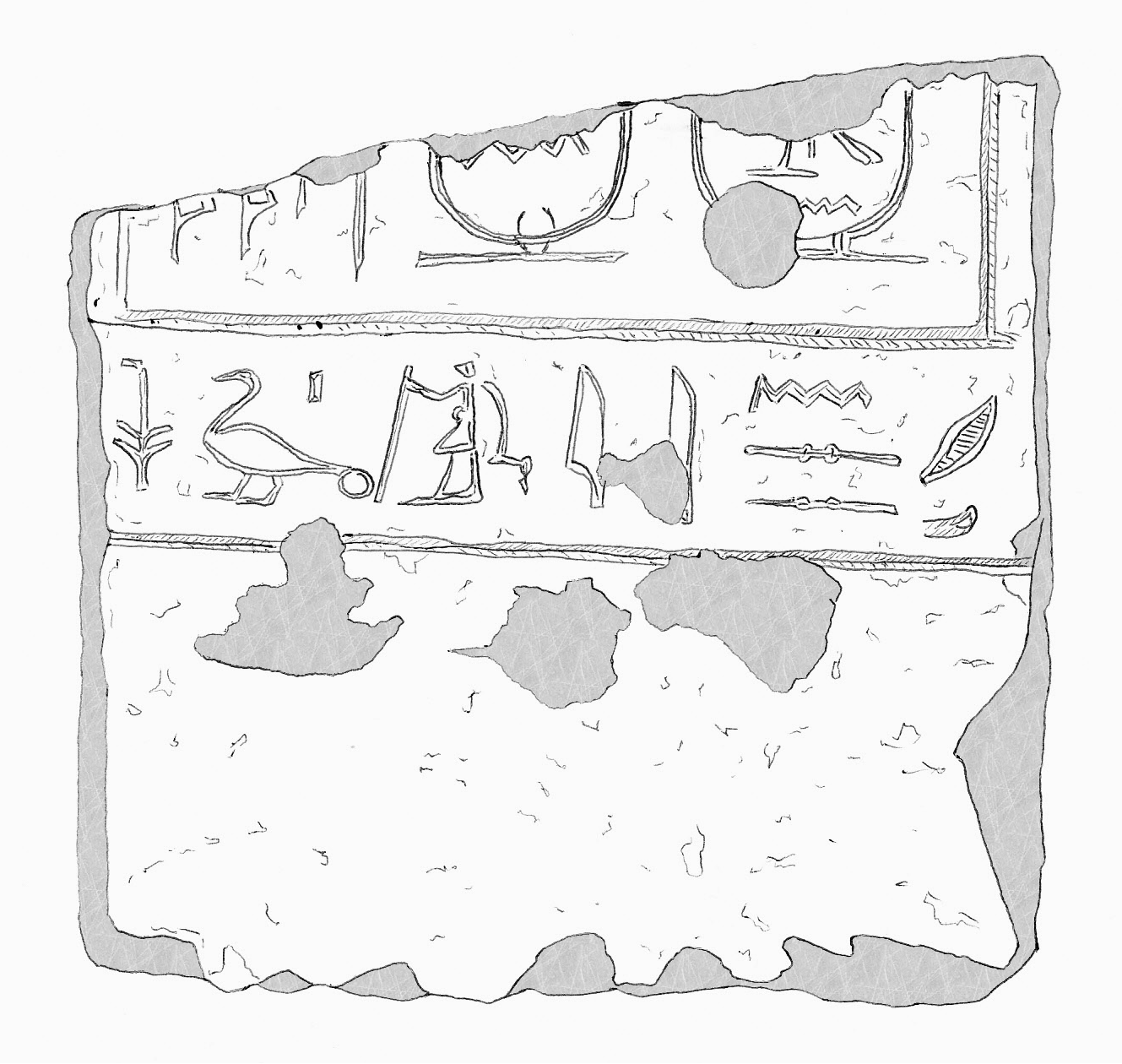
- Stela of Yanassi, from Tell el-Dab'a

Heqa-Khasut
- Reign: More than 10 years
- Predecessor: Khyan?
- Successor: Apepi?
Royal titulary
Nomen
Yanassii i n z z
- Father: Khyan
- Dynasty: 15th Dynasty

Yanassi (also Yanassy and Yansas-aden, possibly reflecting the West Semitic *Jinaśśi’-Ad) was a Hyksos prince, and possibly king, of the Fifteenth Dynasty. He was the eldest son of the pharaoh Khyan, and possibly the crown prince, designated to be Khyan's successor. He may have succeeded his father, thereby giving rise to the mention of a king "Iannas" in Manetho's Aegyptiaca, who, improbably, was said to have ruled after the pharaoh Apophis.

Alternatively, the Egyptologist Kim Ryholt has proposed that Khyan was succeeded by Apophis, and because Yanassi was Khyan's eldest son, Ryholt proposed that Apophis was an usurper. This opinion has been rejected as mere speculation by scholars including David Aston. Archaeological discoveries in the 2010s show that Khyan's rule may have to be pushed further back in time, creating the need and time for one or more kings to reign between Khyan and Apophis. In addition, the Turin canon, an exhaustive list of kings written during the reign of Ramses II, can be interpreted to have credited more than 10 years of reign to a king ruling before Apophis and after Khyan, possibly Yanassi, if he was indeed Apophis' immediate predecessor.

== Attestations ==
In spite of his status as the royal son of the long-reigning Khyan, Yanassi is attested only by a damaged stela (Cairo TD-8422 [176]) found at Tell el-Dab'a, the site of the ancient Hyksos capital, Avaris. On the stela – which was probably dedicated to the god Seth, lord of Avaris – he is called the eldest king's son of Khyan.

If Yanassi indeed became king, he might have ruled between Khyan and Apophis. On the Turin canon, the entry before that attributed to Apophis, on column 10 line 26, is damaged, such that the name of the king is lost, and his reign length is only partial, it may be read as 10, 20, or 30 plus a certain number of years.

A further, though non-contemporary, attestation of Yanassi may be found in Josephus' polemic, Contra Apionem where Josephus claims to directly quote the Aegyptiaca (Αἰγυπτιακά) of Manetho, which would have been written in the 3rd century BC during the reign of Ptolemy II (283 – 246 BC) by the Egyptian priest Manetho. No copies of the Aegyptiaca have survived since antiquity, and it is now known only through later quotations by Sextus Julius Africanus, Josephus and Eusebius. According to Josephus, Manetho's reconstruction of the Fifteenth Dynasty's succession was Salitis, Bnon, Apachnan, Iannas, Archles/Assis, and Apophis. Apachnan is generally understood to be the Hellenized name of Khyan, while Iannas (Ancient Greek: Iαννας) would best be understood as a corruption of that of Yanassi, confirming that he ascended the Hyksos throne. Josephus further reports that Manetho credited Iannas with an improbably long reign of 50 years and one month. In any case, this means that Manetho must have considered Yanassi a king. Until the 2010s, this idea was rejected by the scholarly consensus in Egyptology, which considered Apophis as Khyan's direct successor, as proposed by Ryholt. In this understanding, it appeared more likely that, in a Manethonian passage mentioning both Iannas/Yanassi and Khyan, Josephus erroneously chose the former instead of the latter. This view was challenged by archaeological discoveries which implied that Khyan may have reigned up to 80 years earlier than thought hitherto, necessitating for one or more kings to reign between him and Apophis.

== Bibliography ==
Aston, David A. (2018). "How Early (and How Late) Can Khyan Really Be. An Essay Based on "Conventional Archaeological Methods"". In Moeller, Nadine; Forstner-Müller, Irene (eds.). The Hyksos ruler Khyan and the Early Second Intermediate Period in Egypt: Problems and Priorities of Current Research. Proceedings of the Workshop of the Austrian Archaeological Institute and the Oriental Institute of the University of Chicago, Vienna, July 4 – 5, 2014. Leberstraße 122 A-1110 Wien: Verlag Holzhausen GmbH. pp. 15–56. ISBN 978-3-902976-83-3.
Bietak, Manfred (1981). "Eine Stele des ältesten Königssohnes des Hyksos Chajan". Mitteilungen des Deutschen Archäologischen Instituts, Abteilung Kairo. 37: 63–73.
Gardiner, Alan (1961). Egypt of the Pharaohs: an introduction. Oxford University Press. p. 156. ISBN 978-0-19-500267-6.
Ryholt, Kim (1997). The Political Situation in Egypt during the Second Intermediate Period, c. 1800–1550 B.C. CNI publications, 20. Carsten Niebuhr Institute of Near Eastern Studies, University of Copenhagen : Museum Tusculanum Press. ISBN 978-87-7289-421-8.

| Preceded by Khyan | Pharaoh of Egypt; Fifteenth Dynasty | Succeeded by Apepi |
