= Sakir-Har =

Egyptian pharaoh

Sakir-Har (Śkr-hr)

Heqa-Khasut
- Reign: c. 16th century BC
- Predecessor: Salitis?
- Successor: Khyan?
Royal titulary
Nebty name
Tjes-pedjut
Ṯz-pḏwt
He who subdues the bow people
G16	V1 T10 T10 T10
Golden Horus
Iri-tash-ef
Jrj-t3š.f
He who establishes his boundary
G8	ir t U30 A S Z9 f
Nomen
Heqa-Khasut, Sakir-Har
Ḥq3 ḫ3swt Skr Hr
Ruler of foreign countries (=Hyksos), Reward of Har
S38 N25 Z2 z k r h r
- Monuments: A doorjamb from Tell el-Dab'a
- Dynasty: 15th Dynasty

Sakir-Har (Śkr-hr; Seker-Har) was a Hyksos king of the early Fifteenth Dynasty of Egypt, ruling over some part of Lower Egypt during the Second Intermediate Period, possibly in the early 16th century BC.

== Attestation ==
Sakir-Har is attested by a single inscription on a doorjamb excavated at Tell el-Dab'a—ancient Avaris—by Manfred Bietak in the 1990s.

=== Doorjamb, Cairo TD-8316 ===
The doorjamb, now in Cairo under the catalog number Cairo TD-8316, bears his partial royal titulary in the manner of the Ancient Egyptian, showing his Nebti and Golden Falcon names, as well as his nomen. The doorjamb reads

[Horus who... ...], The possessor of the Wadjet and Nekhbet diadems who subdues the bow people. The Golden Falcon who establishes his boundary. The heka-khawaset, Sakir-Har.

== Theories ==
The doorjamb confirms the identity of Sakir-Har as one of the kings of the Hyksos Fifteenth Dynasty of Egypt. His immediate successor could have been the powerful Hyksos ruler, Khyan, if he was the third Hyksos king of this dynasty, although Sakir-Har's precise position within this dynasty has not yet been established firmly. The name Sakir-Har may translate as "Reward of Har", or may alternatively derive from the Amorite Sikru-Haddu meaning "The memory of Hadad", in which case Sakir-Har may have reigned after Khyan and Yanassi and immediately before Apophis.

The fact that Sakir-Har bears an Egyptian titulary as well as the title of heka-khawaset (Hyksos) suggests that the line of kings to which Sakir-Har belongs may have deliberately taken this title for themselves as had been proposed earlier by scholars, including Donald B. Redford. Bietak shared this opinion, writing that "although this new term [heka-khawaset] perhaps was originally applied by the Egyptians in a disparaging way to the new rulers of the land, the rulers themselves employed ‘Hyksos’ as an official ruler's title". Research has since then refuted the idea that the Egyptians originated the term, further proving that the title of heka-khawaset, "Ruler of Foreign Lands", was invented by the Hyksos rulers possibly to emphasize their origins or, more explicitly, their Amorite affiliation.

Another interpretation has proposed that the name Sakir-Har may be derived from a Semitic linguistic background rather than being explained through Egyptian religious or mythological associations. According to this interpretation, the name may be analyzed using the Hebrew elements sakar (שכר), meaning "reward" or "wages," and har (הר), meaning "mountain" or "hill country." Proponents therefore interpret the name as meaning "Reward of the Hill Country" (Brown-Driver-Briggs Hebrew Lexicon; Theological Wordbook of the Old Testament; The Hebrew and Aramaic Lexicon of the Old Testament; A Grammar of Biblical Hebrew). Supporters of this interpretation argue that such a name would be consistent with the generally accepted view that the Hyksos originated from populations with cultural connections to the Levant. Archaeological evidence from Tell el-Dab'a (ancient Avaris) has been interpreted as demonstrating significant links between the eastern Nile Delta and Canaan during the Second Intermediate Period (Manfred Bietak, Avaris: The Capital of the Hyksos; Kim Ryholt, The Political Situation in Egypt During the Second Intermediate Period; The Hyksos: New Historical and Archaeological Perspectives; Tell el-Dab'a excavation reports). Within this framework, the proposed meaning of Sakir-Har is interpreted as a symbolic reference to an ancestral homeland in the hill country of Canaan.

Some proponents have further suggested that the Hyksos ruler Salatis, known from the writings of Manetho and preserved through later authors such as Josephus, Eusebius, and Syncellus, may represent a title rather than a personal name. This proposal compares the name Salatis with the Hebrew word shalit ("governor" or "ruler"), a term used in the Joseph narratives of Genesis to describe administrative authority (Genesis 37–50; Josephus, Against Apion; Manetho, Aegyptiaca; Eusebius, Chronicle; George Syncellus, Chronography). Building upon this interpretation, some writers have proposed an identification between Salatis and the biblical Joseph. Extending the hypothesis further, it has been suggested that the ruler Sakir-Har could be connected with Issachar, whose name is associated in Genesis 30:18 with the Hebrew root שכר (sakar), meaning "reward." Proponents argue that the similarity between the proposed meaning of Sakir-Har and the biblical explanation of Issachar's name may be significant (Genesis 30:18; Exodus 1:8–10; Brown-Driver-Briggs Hebrew Lexicon; Theological Wordbook of the Old Testament).

=== Papyrus Carlsberg 642 ===
Schneider (2018) points to a late Hyksos tradition which may refer to Śkrhr in the demotic Papyrus Carlsberg 642 which mentions an impious ruler Saker.

== Bibliography ==
Booth, Charlotte (2005). The Hyksos period in Egypt. Shire Egyptology. Vol. 27. Shire: Princes Risborough. ISBN 9780747806387.
Bietak, Manfred (2007). "Où est le palais des Hyksôs ? À propos des fouilles à Tell el-Dabca et 'Ezbet Helmi". Comptes rendus des séances de l'Académie des Inscriptions et Belles-Lettres (in French): 749–780.
Candelora, Danielle (2017). "Defining the Hyksos: A Reevaluation of the Title HqA xAswt and Its Implications for Hyksos Identity". Journal of the American Research Center in Egypt. 53: 203–221. doi:10.5913/jarce.53.2017.a010.
Bietak, Manfred; Hein, I., eds. (1994). Pharaonen und Fremde - Dynastien im Dunkel: Sonderaustellung des Historischen Museums der Stadt Wien in Zusammenarbeit mit dem Ägyptologischen Institut der Universität Wien und dem Österreichischen Archäologischen Institut Kairo, Rathaus Wien, Volkshalle, 8. Sept. - 23. Okt. 1994. Vienna.
Bietak, Manfred (1996). Avaris, the Capital of the Hyksos. Recent Excavations at Tell el-Dab'a. Raymond and Beverly Sackler Foundation distinguished lecture in Egyptology. Vol. 1. London: British Museum Press for the Trustees of the British Museum. ISBN 0714109681.
Redford, D. (1970). "The Hyksos Invasion in History and Tradition". Orientalia. 39 (1).
Ryholt, Kim (1997). The Political Situation in Egypt during the Second Intermediate Period, c. 1800–1550 B.C. CNI publications, 20. Carsten Niebuhr Institute of Near Eastern Studies, University of Copenhagen : Museum Tusculanum Press. ISBN 978-87-7289-421-8.

Preceded by Salitis?	Pharaoh of Egypt; Fifteenth Dynasty	Succeeded by Khyan?
