= Sharek =

Egyptian pharaoh

- Shalek
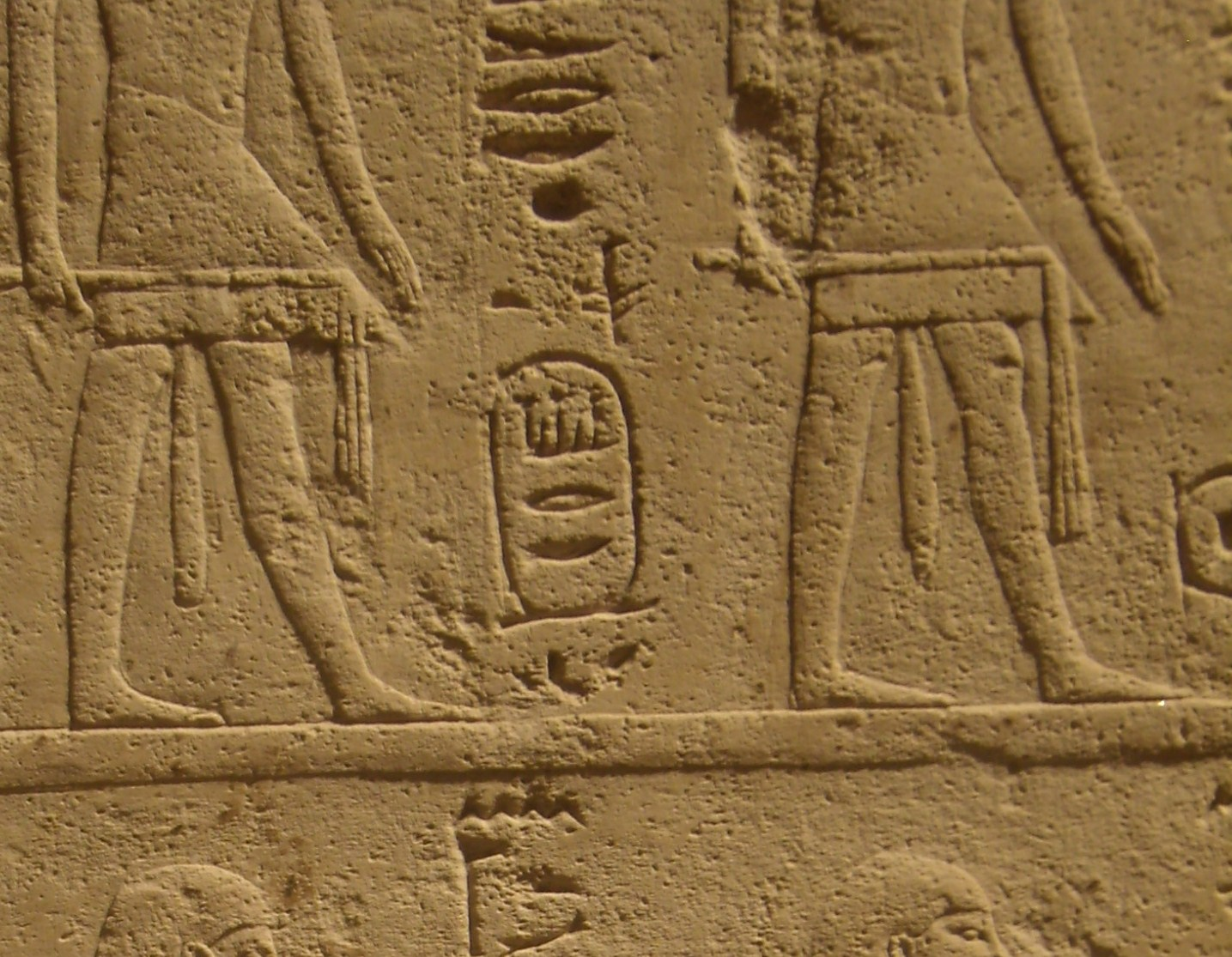
- Detail of the genealogy of Ankhefensekhmet (Berlin 23673); Sharek's name is visible in the middle, enclosed in a cartouche

Pharaoh
Royal titulary
Nomen
Sharek
Š-r-k

G39 N5	M8 D21 V31
- Dynasty: uncertain

Sharek or Shalek could have been a poorly known ancient Egyptian pharaoh during the Second Intermediate Period of Egypt.

== Attestation ==
He is only attested on a non-contemporary document, a genealogy of a priest named Ankhefensekhmet who lived at the end of the 22nd Dynasty – thus several centuries after Sharek's supposed reign; perhaps for this reason, Danish Egyptologist Kim Ryholt doubts his existence. On the document, Sharek is placed one generation before the well-known Hyksos pharaoh Apepi of the 15th Dynasty. The genealogy of Ankhefensekhmet is now exhibited at the Neues Museum in Berlin (inv. no. 23673).

== Identification ==
Both Nicolas Grimal and William C. Hayes have proposed that Sharek should be identified with a king named Salitis, given as the founder of the Hyksos 15th Dynasty in Manetho's Aegyptiaca, a history of Egypt written in the 2nd century BC. They further propose that Sharek/Salitis is the same person as Sheshi, a ruler during Egypt's Second Intermediate Period mentioned on nearly 400 scarab seals.
