= 1690s BC =

Decade

The 1690s BC was a decade lasting from January 1, 1699, BC to December 31, 1690, BC.

== Events and trends ==
- The Minoan and Harappan Civilizations continue to exist in Crete and Ancient India respectively.
- 1700–1500 BC—Hurrian conquests.
- Second Intermediate Period, in which the Hyksos invades Egypt, continues.
- 1698 BC- King Jie of China kills his minister Guan Longfeng according to Chinese legend.
- The Exodus of the Israelites from Egypt, according to Thrasyllus of Mendes, an Egyptian mathematician and astronomer who lived in the reign of Tiberius (c. 1691 BC).
- 1691 BC June—Lunar Saros 32 begins.

== Significant people ==
- Belu-bani, King of Assyria, r. 1700–1691 BC.
- Libaia, King of Assyria r. 1691–1674 BC.
- Abi-eshuh, King of Babylon, r. 1712–1684 (middle chronology)
- Jie, Legendary King of the supposed Xia dynasty (existence disputed) in China, r. c.1728–1675 BC
- Merneferre Ay, Pharaoh of Egypt, r. c.1714–1691 BC
- Merhotepre Ini, Pharaoh of Egypt, r. c.1691–1689 BC
- Fourteenth dynasty Pharaohs (see List of Pharaohs for details), 1705–1690 BC
- Lila-Ir-Tash king of the Elamite Empire, r. c.1700–c.1698 BC.
- Temti-Agun I king of the Elamite Empire, r. c.1698–c.1690 BC.
- Tan-Uli king of the Elamite Empire, r. c.1690–c.1655 BC.
- Agum I, King of the Kassites, r. 1705–1690 BC
- Kashtiliash I, King of the Kassites, r. 1690–1680 BC
- Itti-Ili-Nibi, King of the Sealand, r. c.1700–1683 BC
- 1695 BC—Death of Sarah, wife of Abraham, according to the Hebrew Calendar
- 1691 BC—Death of Merneferre Ay, Pharaoh of Egypt
