= Herit =

Ancient Egyptian princess

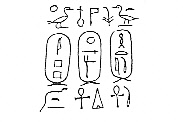
- Inscription from a vessel fragment, bearing the cartouches of Apepi and Herit
Egyptian name
< H r i ti >
- Dynasty: 15th Dynasty
- Father: Apepi (?)
- Mother: Tani (?)

Herit (Transliterated: ḥ–r–ỉ–t) was an ancient Egyptian princess of the Second Intermediate Period. She was most likely the daughter of the Hyksos-ruler Apepi who was the most important king of the 15th Dynasty.

== Biography ==
The names of the king and of Herit appear on the fragment of a stone vessel found in a Theban tomb (Tomb ANB) excavated by Howard Carter sometimes regarded as the one of king Amenhotep I. This finding led to speculation that Herit may have been married to a Theban king of the 17th Dynasty. The vase, however, may just as well have been an item which was looted from Avaris after the eventual victory over the Hyksos by Ahmose I.

== Attestation ==
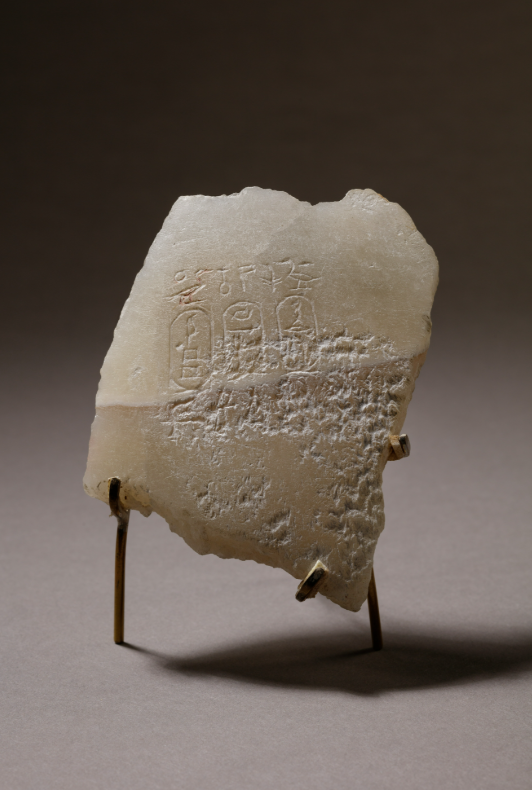
Inscription from a vessel fragment, bearing the cartouches of Apepi and Herit

On the vessel Herit bears the title king's daughter. Her name is written in a cartouche, a privilege not granted to all members of the royal family. Nothing else is known about her. The fragment of the stone vessel is today in the Metropolitan Museum of Art (21.7.7).
