= Khyan =

Egyptian pharaoh

- Khayan, Khian, Chayan
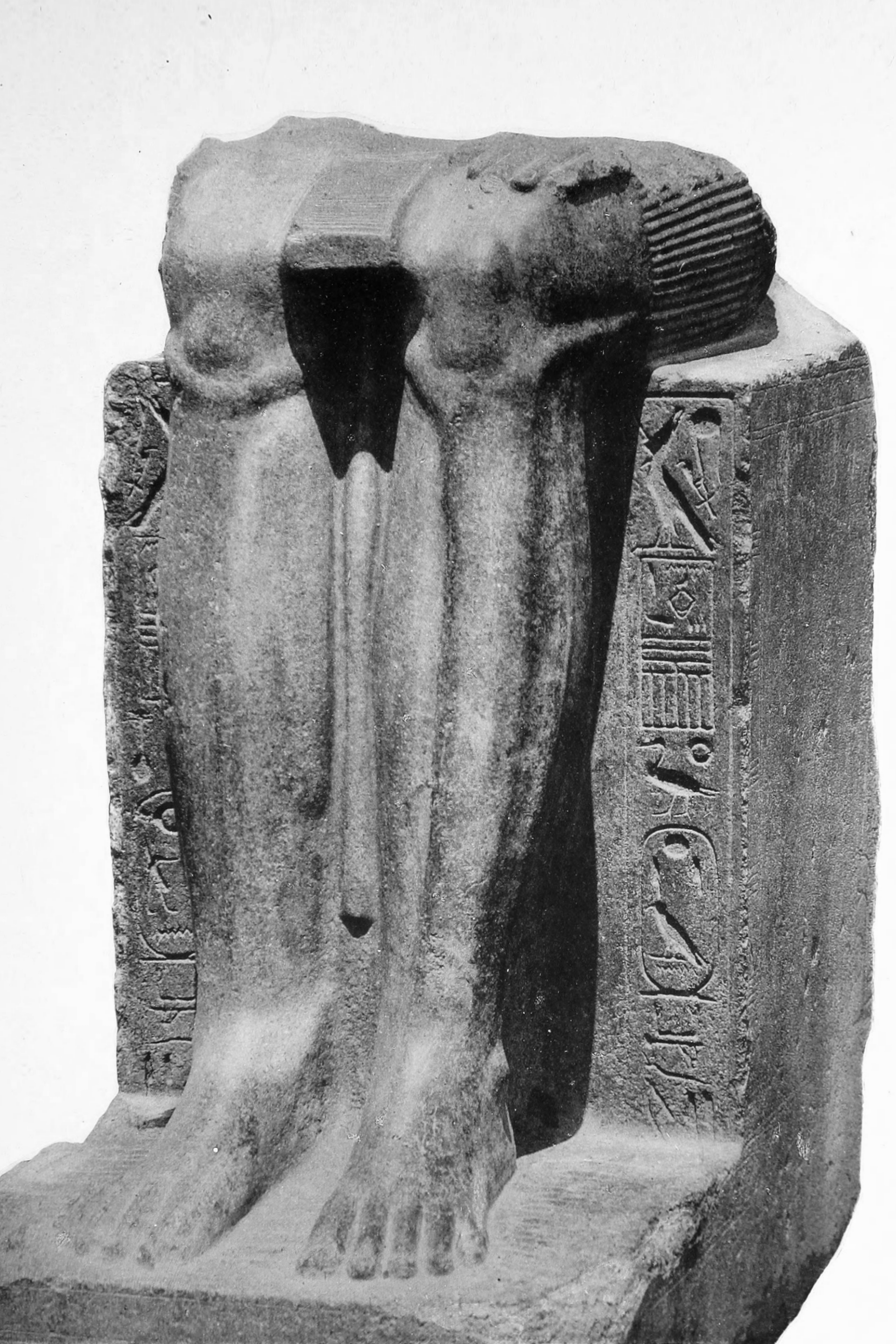
- Remains of a statue of the Twelfth Dynasty reappropriated by Hyksos ruler Khyan, with his cartouche inscribed on the sides over an erasure.

Heqa-Khasut
- Reign: Dating subject to ongoing debate in Egyptology. Possibly second half of the 17th century BC and more generally floruit may be anywhere between c. 1700 BC and c. 1580 BC. (Note: Dates proposed for Khyan's reign: c. 1700–1669/1667 BC, 1653–1614 BC, 1610?–1580 BC)
- Predecessor: Sakir-Har
- Successor: Yanassi or Apepi
Royal titulary
Horus name
Hor-Inek-Tau
ḥr-jnk-tꜢw
Horus, who unites the shores
G5	i n q N21 Z2
Prenomen
Seuserenre

M23 X1 L2 X1	N5 s F9 D54 n
Nomen
Khyan

G39 N5	x i i A n
- Children: Yanassi ♂
- Monuments: A Stela in Avaris
- Dynasty: Fifteenth Dynasty

Seuserenre Khyan was a Hyksos king of the Fifteenth Dynasty of Egypt, ruling over Lower Egypt in the second half of the 17th century BC.

Khyan is one of the better attested kings from the Hyksos period, known from many seals and seal impressions. Remarkable are objects with his name found at Knossos and Hattusha indicating diplomatic contacts with Crete and the Hittites. A sphinx with his name was bought on the art market at Baghdad and might demonstrate diplomatic contacts to Babylon, in an example of Egypt-Mesopotamia relations.

== Name and titles ==
The name Khyan is written in variations as Khayan, Khian etc.

His royal name Seuserenre translates as "The one whom Re has caused to be strong." Khyan bears the titles of an Egyptian king, but also the title ruler of the foreign land (heqa-khaset). The later title is the typical designation of the Hyksos rulers.

The name Khyan has been "interpreted as Amorite Hayanu (reading h-ya-a-n) which the Egyptian form represents perfectly, and this is in all likelihood the correct interpretation." The name Hayanu is recorded in the Assyrian king lists—see "Khorsabad List I, 17 and the SDAS List, I, 16"--"for a remote ancestor of Shamshi-Adad I (c.1800 BC)." It should be stressed that Khyan's name was not original and had been in use for centuries before the fifteenth (Hyksos) Dynasty.

== Reign ==
=== Relative dating ===
Khyan can be archaeologically associated with Tell el-Daba Stratum E/1 during the late Middle Bronze IIB, providing a relative date for his reign. At Tell el-Daba, the Hyksos period (15th Dynasty) spans from Stratum E/2.1 to D/2 (late MB IIB-MB IIC), placing Khyan to the early 15th Dynasty. Some items are also found in the succeeding stratum D/3 perhaps after his death, a stratum usually associated with Apepi. Bietak (2001) dates Stratum E/1 from 1620 to 1590 BC, based roughly on a 30-year pottery seqence per stratum.

=== Stronghold ===
Khyan's seat of power was located in Avaris, which hosted a strongly fortified palace. Seal impressions of Khyan and a stela of his eldest son, prince Yanassi, were found in two areas of the city during excavations, confirming his presence onsite. The palace, possibly destroyed during the later conquest of the Hyksos' kingdom by the Thebans under Ahmose I, (Note: The palace was decorated with painted murals in Cretan styles and motifs. Initially the palace excavator Manfred Bietak, saw this as suggestion of far-reaching cultural and commercial exchanges under the Hyksos. He later reappraised the dating of the murals, proposing instead that they date to the early 18th Dynasty of Egypt under Hatshepsut or Thutmose III.) comprised a high platform built on massive brick casemates surrounded by columned halls and monumental staircases leading to a still higher platform, on which the royal apartments probably stood. This palace seems to have been abandoned c. 1600 BC, at which point an enormous ritual feast was orchestrated, filling several 5 m (16 ft) wide pits with animal bones and thousands of pottery fragments in consequence. Some of these fragments came from an array of vessels produced by the Kerma culture, a Nubian kingdom and Hyksos' ally during the Second Intermediate Period. The Egyptologist Manfred Bietak proposes that the ritual feast and abandonment of the palace were triggered by the death of its owner, most probably Khyan. On the western edge of Avaris, another fortress was subsequently erected in the later Hyksos period c. 1560-1530 BC, likely under Khyan's successor Apepi.

East of Avaris, the Hyksos controlled the massive 350 m × 400 m (1,150 ft × 1,310 ft) fortress of Tjaru on the road to Sinai and Canaan, where stelae of the Hyksos king Apepi were uncovered.

According to Manfred Bietak, Khyan's rule marks the peak of the Hyksos kingdom power. In this view, Khyan directly ruled over Lower and Middle Egypt up to Cusae and indirectly dominated the Nile Valley as far south as Thebes, forcing native Egyptian kingdoms including those of the 16th and Abydos Dynasty into vassal states. At the time of Khyan, relations between the Hyksos and their Egyptian vassals were likely peaceful, centered on exchange and trade and possibly even including donations to Upper Egyptian sanctuaries, such as one in Gebelein, were blocks inscribed with Khyan's name were uncovered. All of this is contested however. For Alexander Ilin-Tomich, the territory directly ruled by the Hyksos kings of Avaris was likely confined to the eastern Delta and the nature and extent of their control over Middle Egypt remains unclear.

== Khyan's position in the Hyksos dynasty ==
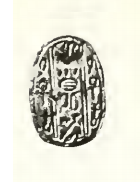
Scarab of Khyan

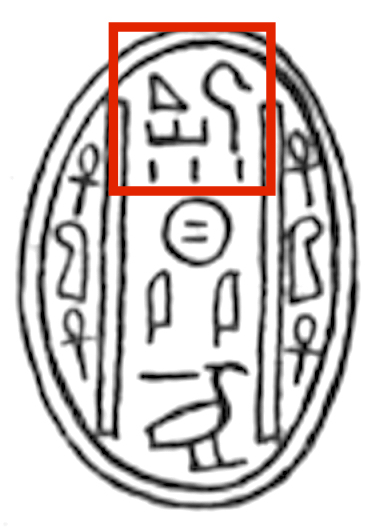
Scarab of "Khyan the Heka Khasut "Hyksos"" ("Hyksos" highlighted)

Khyan is identified with king Iannas in the works of Josephus whose knowledge of the Hyksos Pharaohs was derived from a history of Egypt written by Manetho. Josephus mentions him after Apophis when discussing the reign lengths of kings who ruled after Salitis. This led 18th century scholars such as Arthur Bedford to place Khyan after Apophis, towards the end of the Hyksos dynasty. However, in Sextus Julius Africanus' version of Manetho's Epitome, Khyan (whose name is transcribed there as Staan) is listed after a king Pachnan, perhaps Yaqub-Har. Nonetheless, the hypothesis of a temporal proximity between kings Khyan and Apepi is now commonly accepted though questionable and contested. Stylistically Khyan's scarabs resemble closely those of Yaqub-Har, who might date rather to the beginning and not to the end of the Hyksos-period. This indicates that Khyan was one of the earlier rulers of the 15th dynasty.

The early position of Khyan within the 15th dynasty may be confirmed by new archaeological finds at Edfu. On this site were found seal impressions of Khyan in close connection with seal impressions of the 13th Dynasty king Sobekhotep IV, indicating that both kings could have reigned at about the same time. The scholars Moeller and Marouard discuss the discovery of an important early 12th dynasty Middle Kingdom administrative building in the eastern Tell Edfu area which was continuously employed into the early Second Intermediate Period before it fell out of use during the 17th dynasty when its remains were sealed by a large silo court. Fieldwork by Egyptologists in 2010 and 2011 into the remains of the former 12th dynasty building which was also used in the 13th dynasty led to the discovery of a large adjoining hall which proved to contain 41 sealings showing the cartouche of the Hyksos ruler Khyan together with 9 sealings naming the 13th dynasty king Sobekhotep IV. As Moeller and Marouard write: "These finds come from a secure and sealed archaeological context and open up new questions about the cultural and chronological evolution of the late Middle Kingdom and early Second Intermediate Period." These conclusions are rejected by Robert Porter who argues that Khyan ruled much later than Sobekhotep IV and that the seals of a pharaoh were used even long after his death. Another option he proposed is that Sobekhotep IV reigned much later than previously thought.

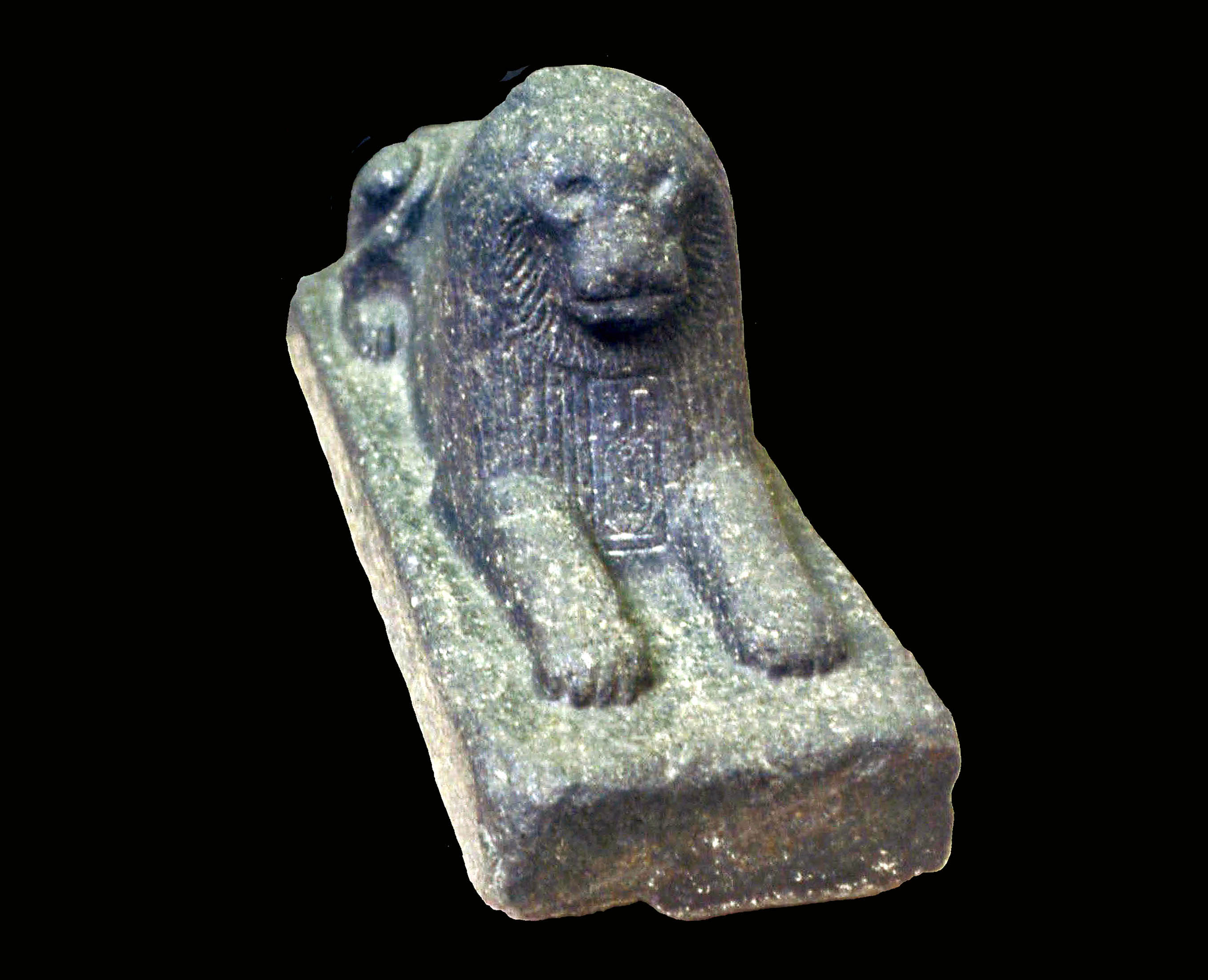
Lion inscribed with the cartouche of Khyan, found in Baghdad, suggesting relations with Babylon. British Museum, EA 987.

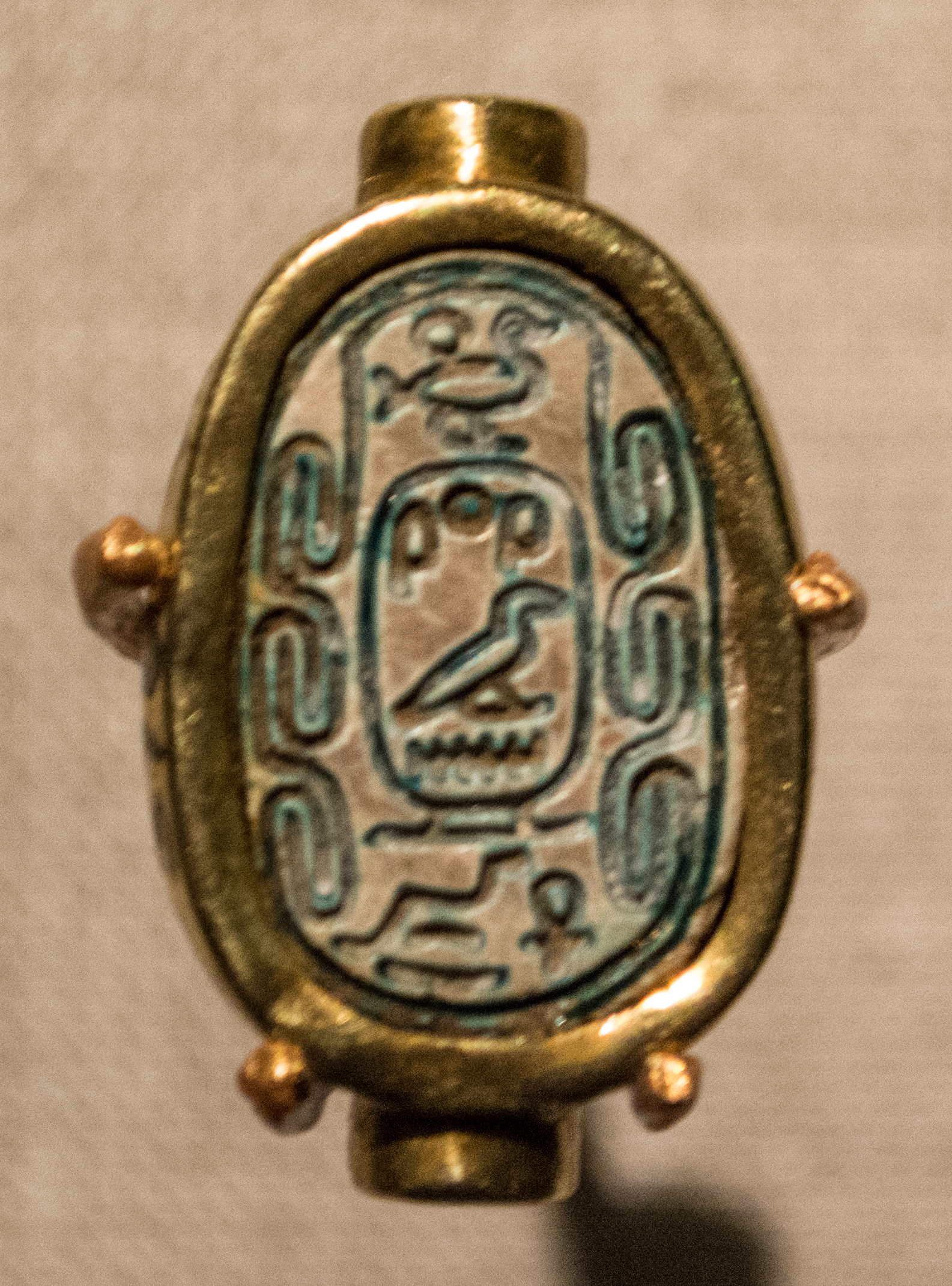
Blue glazed steatite scarab in a gold mount, with the cartouche of Khyan:N5 G39 < x i i A n > S34 I10 t N17 - "Son of Ra, Khyan, living forever!"

Nearly all carbon-14 analyses of materials related to the Second Intermediate Period yield dates on average 120 years earlier than was expected from the prevailing chronological reconstruction of the 15th Dynasty. While the debate is ongoing, Egyptologists have acknowledged the validity of these observations and that they indicate some major issue with the consensus reached hitherto. Khyan's rule is no longer dated with any accuracy. The Egyptologist David Aston has shown that available evidence is compatible with Khyan ruling anywhere between 1700 BC and 1580 BC, with the former his preferred scenario. The possibility that one or more kings reigned between him and Apophis is now the dominant hypothesis.

=== Edfu ===
At Edfu (Upper Egypt), seal impressions of Khyan (early 15th Dynasty) have been found in the same context as seal impressions of Sobekhotep IV (late 13th Dynasty), indicating that both rulers may have been contemporaries. Both late 13th Dynasty and early 15th Dynasty are contemporary with the Middle Bronze IIB (MB IIB) in the Levant, while late 15th dynasty equals Middle Bronze IIC (MB IIC; 1600/1590-1550 BCE) in the Southern Levant and Late Bronze IA in the Northern Levant.

The scholars Moeller and Marouard discuss the discovery of an important early 12th dynasty Middle Kingdom administrative building in the eastern Tell Edfu area which was continuously employed into the early Second Intermediate Period before it fell out of use during the 17th dynasty when its remains were sealed by a large silo court. Fieldwork by Egyptologists in 2010 and 2011 into the remains of the former 12th dynasty building which was also used in the 13th dynasty led to the discovery of a large adjoining hall which proved to contain 41 sealings showing the cartouche of the Hyksos ruler Khyan together with 9 sealings naming the 13th dynasty king Sobekhotep IV. As Moeller and Marouard write: "These finds come from a secure and sealed archaeological context and open up new questions about the cultural and chronological evolution of the late Middle Kingdom and early Second Intermediate Period." These conclusions are rejected by Robert Porter who argues that Khyan ruled much later than Sobekhotep IV and that the seals of a pharaoh were used even long after his death. Another option he proposed is that Sobekhotep IV reigned much later than previously thought.

=== Tell el-Daba (Avaris) ===
In Area R/III, ten seal impressions bore the royal name of Khayan and another seal impression the prenomen of Khauserre. Most of the Khayan sealings were found in a late SIP context, while one sealing belong to the early SIP in Stratum E/1 (MB IIB) in the early 15th dynasty. The sealings were used on bags, sacks, baskets and boxes.

==== Stela of Khyan ====
At Tell el-Daba (Avaris), the Stela of Khyan (Cairo TD-8422) contains the nomen and prenomen with a lost dedication to a deity (presumably "Seth, Lord of Avaris"), below which are the title and name "Eldest King's Son, Yanassi". Ryholt (1997:256) notes that the association of Khyan with the Eldest King's Son Yanassi, suggest that the latter's title (s3-nsw smsw) was the designated successor. Ryholt further speculates that Manetho might have mentioned Yanassi in a lost passage, and that Josephus used the name Iannas and mixed him with his father in his chronological list.

== Attestations ==
The main source for the attestations of Khyan follows Ryholt 1997:383 File 15/4.

=== Ruler of Foreign Lands (hk3-h3swt) ===
Attestations as "Ruler of Foreign Lands" (ḥḳꜣ-ḫꜣswt; hk3-h3swt), the title consisting of ḥḳꜣ (Heqa; Ruler/Cheiftain) + ḫꜣswt (Khasut; Foreign Lands/Hill Countries). The word ḫꜣswt is the plural form (w) of ḫꜣst (land/hill country).

- Gezer (Palestine): A scarab-seal in gold mount.
- Ezbet Rushdi (Lower Egypt): A scarab-seal.
- Tell el-Yahudiya (Lower Egypt): A scarab-seal
- Giza (Lower Egypt): A scarab-seal.
- Provenance Unkonwn: 3x cylinder-seals
- Provenance Unknown: 11x scarab-seals

=== King ===
Attestations as king (nsw).

- Bogazköi (Turkey): Vessel.
- Baghdad (Iraq): Lion-sculpture.
- Knossos (Crete): Jar-lid.
- Tel Zafit (Palestine): A seal-impression.
- Tell el-Dab'a (Lower Egypt): A stela of king's son.
- Tell el-Dab'a (Lower Egypt): 2x scarab-seals
- Bubastis (Lower Egypt): An usurped statue.
- Saqqara (Lower Egypt): A cylinder-seal.
- Abusir el-Melek (Lower Egypt): A scarab-seal.
- Gebelein (Upper Egypt): A stone block.
- Provenance Unknown: 5x scarab-seals in gold mount.
- Provenance Unknown: 11x scarab-seals

== Bibliography ==
- Aston, David A. (2018). "How Early (and How Late) Can Khyan Really Be. An Essay Based on "Conventional Archaeological Methods"". In Moeller, Nadine; Forstner-Müller, Irene (eds.). The Hyksos ruler Khyan and the Early Second Intermediate Period in Egypt: Problems and Priorities of Current Research. Proceedings of the Workshop of the Austrian Archaeological Institute and the Oriental Institute of the University of Chicago, Vienna, July 4 – 5, 2014. Vienna: Verlag Holzhausen GmbH. pp. 15–56. ISBN 978-3-902976-83-3.
- Ben-Tor, Daphna (2007). Scarabs, chronology, and interconnections: Egypt and Palestine in the Second Intermediate Period. Orbis Biblicus et Orientalis. Series Archaeologica. Vol. 27. Fribourg: Academic Press. ISBN 978-3-72-781593-5.
- Bietak, Manfred (1981). "Eine Stele des ältesten Königssohnes des Hyksos Chajan". Mitteilungen des Deutschen Archäologischen Instituts, Abteilung Kairo (in German). 37, Labib Habachi Festschrift: 63–71.
- Bietak, Manfred (2000). "Rich beyond the Dreams of Avaris: Tell el-Dabʿa and the Aegean World: A Guide for the Perplexed': A Response to Eric H. Cline". The Annual of the British School at Athens. 95. Athens: British School at Athens: 185–205. doi:10.1017/S0068245400004639. S2CID 159570045.
- Bietak, Manfred (2001). "Hyksos". In Redford, Donald B. (ed.). The Oxford Encyclopedia of Ancient Egypt, Volume 2. Oxford: Oxford University Press. pp. 136–143. ISBN 978-0-19-510234-5.
- Bietak, Manfred (2007). "Où est le palais des Hyksôs ? À propos des fouilles à Tell el-Dabca et 'Ezbet Helmi". Comptes rendus des séances de l'Académie des Inscriptions et Belles-Lettres (in French). 151 (2): 749–780. doi:10.3406/crai.2007.87946.
- Ilin-Tomich, Alexander (2016). "Second Intermediate Period". UCLA Encyclopedia of Egyptology: 1–21.
- Ilin-Tomich, Alexander (2014). "The Theban kingdom of Dynasty 16: Its rise, administration and politics". Journal of Egyptian History. 7 (2): 143–193. doi:10.1163/18741665-12340016.
- Moeller, Nadine; Forstner-Müller, Irene (2018). "Introduction". In Moeller, Nadine; Forstner-Müller, Irene (eds.). The Hyksos ruler Khyan and the Early Second Intermediate Period in Egypt: Problems and Priorities of Current Research. Proceedings of the Workshop of the Austrian Archaeological Institute and the Oriental Institute of the University of Chicago, Vienna, July 4 – 5, 2014. Vienna: Verlag Holzhausen GmbH. pp. 7–13. ISBN 978-3-902976-83-3.
- Mumford, Gregory (2001a). "Sinai". In Redford, Donald B. (ed.). The Oxford Encyclopedia of Ancient Egypt, Volume 3. Oxford: Oxford University Press. pp. 288–292. ISBN 978-0-19-510234-5.
- Mumford, Gregory (2001b). "Syria-Palestine". In Redford, Donald B. (ed.). The Oxford Encyclopedia of Ancient Egypt, Volume 3. Oxford: Oxford University Press. pp. 335–343. ISBN 978-0-19-510234-5.
- Redford, Donald B., ed. (2001). "Egyptian King List". The Oxford Encyclopedia of Ancient Egypt, Volume 2. Oxford: Oxford University Press. pp. 637–640. ISBN 978-0-19-510234-5.
- Stadelmann, Rainer (2001). "Palaces". In Redford, Donald B. (ed.). The Oxford Encyclopedia of Ancient Egypt, Volume 3. Oxford: Oxford University Press. pp. 13–17. ISBN 978-0-19-510234-5.
- Tyson Smith, Stuart (2001). "People". In Redford, Donald B. (ed.). The Oxford Encyclopedia of Ancient Egypt, Volume 3. Oxford: Oxford University Press. pp. 27–33. ISBN 978-0-19-510234-5.

=== Further reading ===
- Irene Forster-Müller, Nadine Moeller (eds.), The Hyksos Ruler Khyan and the Early Second Intermediate Period in Egypt: Problems and Priorities of Current Research. Proceedings of the Workshop of the Austrian Archaeological Institute and the Oriental Institute of the University of Chicago, Vienna, July 4–5, 2014.(online)

Preceded by Sakir-Har	Pharaoh of Egypt; Fifteenth Dynasty	Succeeded by Yanassi or Apepi
