= 1640s BC =

Decade

The 1640s BC was a decade lasting from January 1, 1649 BC to December 31, 1640 BC.

== Significant people ==
- Bazaya, King of Assyria, r. 1650–1622 BC
- Ammi-Ditana, King of Babylonia, r. 1684–1647 BC (Middle chronology)
- Ammi-Saduqa, King of Babylonia, r. 1647–1626 BC (Middle chronology)
- Tang, Shang dynasty king of China, r. 1675–1646 BC
- Tài Dīng, Shang dynasty king of China, r. 1646–1644 BC
- Bu Bing, Shang dynasty king of China, r. 1644–1612 BC
- Salitis, Fifteenth Dynasty pharaoh of Egypt, r. c. 1648–1628 BC
- Djehuti, Sixteenth Dynasty pharaoh of Egypt, r. c. 1650–1647 BC
- Sobekhotep VIII, Sixteenth Dynasty pharaoh of Egypt, r. c. 1647–1631 BC
- Kuk-Nashur II, King of Elam, r. c. 1650–1635 BC
- Hattusili I, King of the Hittites, r. c. 1650–1620 BC (middle chronology)
- Kashtiliash II, King of the Kassites, r. 1650–1640 BC
- Urzigurumash, King of the Kassites, r. 1640–1630 BC
- Ishkibal, King of the Sealand, r. 1657–1642 BC
- Shushshi, King of the Sealand, r. 1642–1618 BC
