= Statue of Idrimi =

Ancient Middle Eastern sculpture

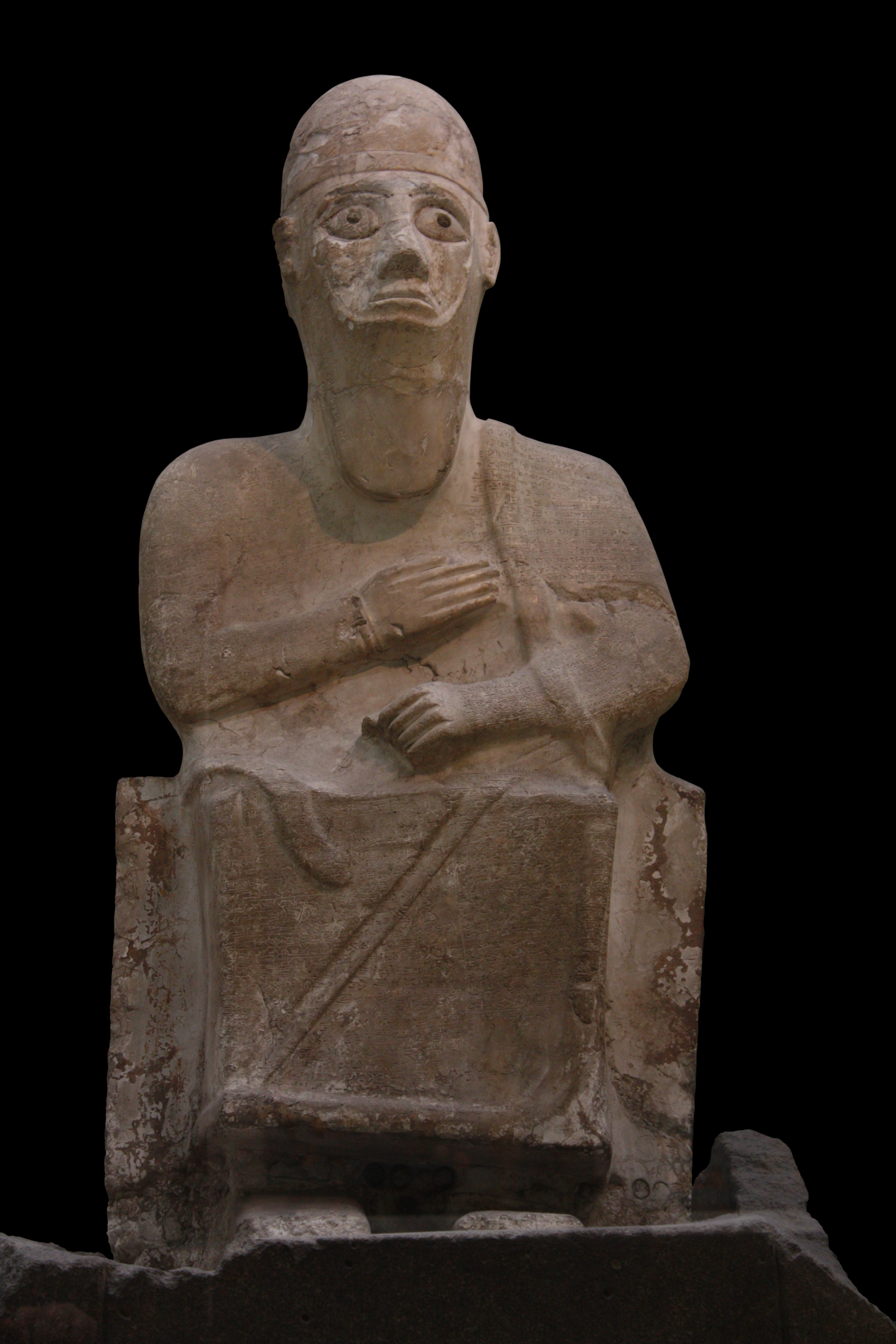
- Material: Magnesite
- Height: 1.041 meters
- Width: 48.26 cm
- Created: c. 1450 BC
- Discovered: 1939; Hatay, Turkey
- Discovered by: Charles Woolley
- Present location: British Museum, England, United Kingdom
- Identification: 130738

The Statue of Idrimi is an important ancient Middle Eastern sculpture found at the site of Alalakh by the British archaeologist Sir Leonard Woolley in 1939, dating from the 15th century BC. The statue is famous for its long biographical inscription of King Idrimi written in Akkadian. It has been part of the British Museum's collection since the year it was discovered. The inscription includes the "first certain cuneiform reference" to Canaan.

== Discovery ==
The Statue of Idrimi was discovered in 1939 by Charles Woolley in the ruins of a temple at the site of Tell Atchana, ancient Alalakh in Hatay, Turkey. The statue had been badly damaged, presumably at a time of invasion or civil war around 1200 BC. The statue's head and feet had been broken off and it had been deliberately toppled off its pedestal.

== Description ==
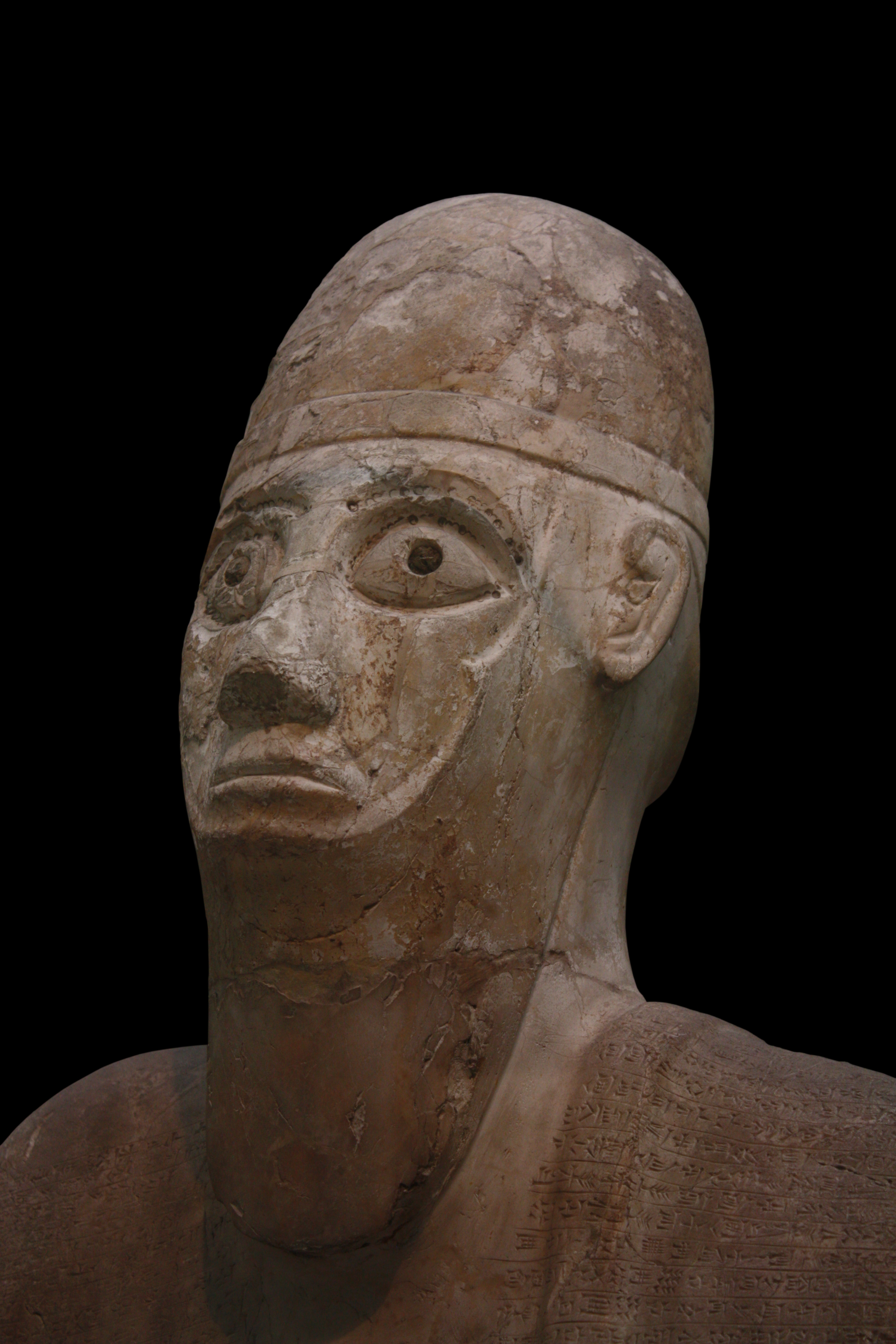
Detail of the head

The statue is carved of hard white dolomitic magnesite and the eyebrows, eyelids, and pupils are inlaid with glass and black stone. The king, who is seated on a throne, wears a round-topped crown with band and neck-guard and a garment with narrow borders. King Idrimi is depicted crossing his right arm above the left. An inscription covers large parts of the body.

== Inscription ==
The inscription on the statue is written in Akkadian, using cuneiform script. It describes the exploits of King Idrimi and his family. The inscription tells how, following a dispute, Idrimi and his family were forced to flee Yamhad (Aleppo) to his mother's family at Emar (now Meskene) on the Euphrates River. Determined to restore the dynasty's fortunes, Idrimi left Emar and travelled to Canaan, where he lived among Hapiru warriors for seven years, after which he made a treaty with the king of Umman-Manda, rallied troops and mounted a seaborne expedition to recover the lost territory from the Hittites. He eventually became a vassal of King Barattarna who installed him as king in Alalakh, which he ruled for 30 years. The inscription ends with curses on anyone who desecrates or destroys the statue:

(Lines 1–29): I am Idrimi, son of Ilim-Ilimma, servant of Teshub, Ḫepat, and Šauška, the lady of Alalakh, [the lady who is] my lady. In Aleppo, the house of my father, a bad thing occurred, so we fled to the Emarites, sisters [o]f my mother, and settled at Emar. Though my older brothers lived with me, none deliberated matters as I did. I thought like this: "Indeed, who is at his father’s house, but is nonetheless a servant among the people of Emar?" I took my horse, my chariot, and my chariot driver. I crossed over into a desolate region, where I joined the Sutean pastoralists. With him (them), I spent the night. The next day, I set out and journeyed to the land of Kinanim (Canaanites). The city of Ammiya sits in the land of Canaanites, [and] in Ammiya dwell(ed) people originally from Aleppo, [and] the lands of Mukiš, Niḫi, and Amaʾe. They recognized me – that I was the son of their lord – and gathered around me, and in that way, I was elevated in rank. For seven long years, I stayed among the habiru. I released birds (as auguries), I inspected (the livers of) lambs, and seven years [later], the Storm God turned toward me.

(Lines 30–39): I built ships. I loaded soldiers onto the ships, I approached the land of Mukiš by sea, and I reached dry land in front of Mount Ḫazi. I went up (the mountain), and when my land heard me, they brought oxen and sheep to me. In one day, as one man, the lands of Niḫi, Amaʾe, [and] Mukiš and the city of Alalakh, my city, turned to me. My brothers heard (about this) and came to me. My brothers toiled for me, [and] I protected my brothers.

(Lines 40–59): Furthermore, for seven years, Barattarna, the powerful king, the king of the Hurrians, made enemies for me. In the seventh of the years, I sent a message to Barattarna, the king, king of the Umman-manda and told of the service of my forefathers – that my forefathers toiled for them so that our words were for the kings of the Hurrians. It was good. They established a powerful oath between them. The powerful king listened to the service of our ancestors and the oath that was between them, and he respected the “mark” of the oath. He accepted my greeting gift because of the matter of the oath and because of our service. I enlarged [lost] for a sacrifice, and so I returned a lost house to him: I seized a previously-abandoned hem for him oath in my status as a loyal retainer, and then I was king for Alalakh. Kings to my right and my left came up here to me, and thus I was made equal to them.

(Lines 60–76): Because the city wall of the forefathers lay tumbled on the ground, I caused [bricks] to rise up from on the ground, and I set them up high as the sky. I took troops, went up to the land of Hatti, and captured seven cities: Paššahe, Damarutla, Ḫuluḫḫan, Zila, Iʾe, Uluzila, and Zaruna. I captured these cities, and I destroyed others. The land of Hatti did not gather and come against me. I did what I wished. I carried off captives and took all types of goods and possessions. I distributed [the plunder] to my auxiliaries, my brothers, and my allies. I myself took their weapon(s), though.

(Lines 77-83): I returned to the land of Mukiš and entered Alalakh, my city. With the captives and livestock, with all the goods and possessions that I brought down from the land of Hatti, I had a house built. I made my throne like the thrones of kings. I made my brothers like the brothers of kings, my sons like their sons, and my companions like their companions.

(Lines 84–91): As for the inhabitants whose dwelling was [already] in my land, in kindness, I caused them to reside. I housed even those who lacked a dwelling. I stabilized my land and made my cities like our previous ones. And just as our father established the signs of the gods of Alalakh, I was regularly performing the offerings for our grandfather that he regularly caused to be performed. I regularly performed these (rites), and I entrusted them to Teshub-nerari, my son.

(Lines 92–97): Whoever removes this statue of mine – may Heaven curse him, (and) the Underworld gather up his offspring. May the gods of heaven and earth measure out his reign and his land for him. Whoever alters it (the inscription?) or erases [it] – may Teshub, the lord of heaven and earth, and the great gods, destroy his name and his seed from his land.

(Lines 98–101): Šarruwa, the scribe, is a servant of the Teshub, Šimige, Kušuḫ, and Šauška. Šarruwa is the scribe who wrote [the inscription on] this statue. May the gods of heaven and earth keep him alive (and) protect him. May they be good to him. May Teshub, lord of above and below, lord of ghosts, be the one who revives him.

(Lines 102–104): I was king for 30 years. I wrote my labors on myself. May it encourage [lost] so that they may pray to me regularly.
