= Temple of Ezbet Rushdi =

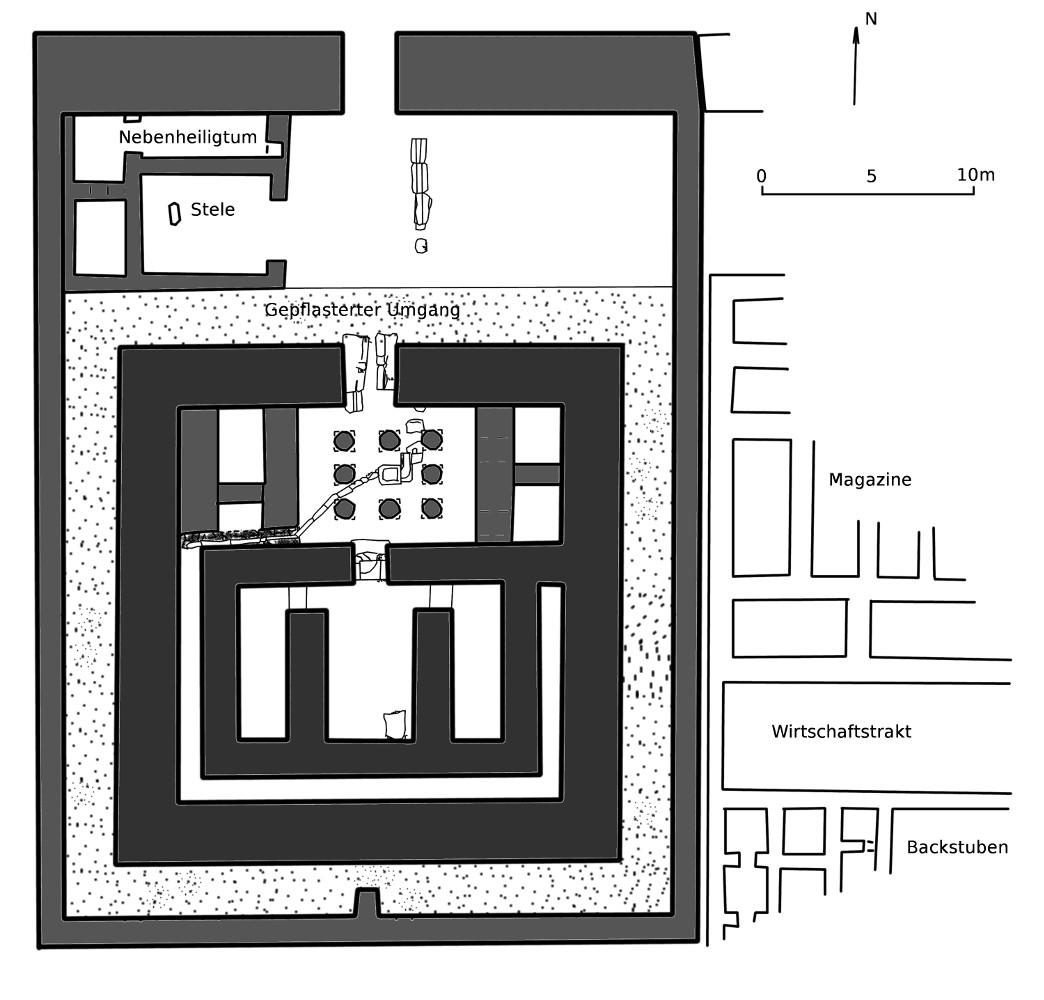
- Plan of the temple

- Location in Egypt

General information
- Location: Sharqia, Egypt
- Construction started: c. 1975 BC
- Completed: c. 1875 BC

Dimensions
- Other dimensions: Length: 41.5 meters Width: 31 meters

Technical details
- Material: Mudbrick

The ancient Egyptian Temple of Ezbet Rushdi was discovered near the modern village of Ezbet Rushdi el-Saghira – itself just north of Tell el-Dab'a, the ancient Avaris – and dates to the 12th Dynasty. It was first excavated from 1951 by Shehata Adam who was working for the Egyptian Antiquities Service. The temple was again excavated in 1996 by an Austrian mission under Manfred Bietak.

== Layout and foundation ==
The temple complex has a layout that is typical of the Middle Kingdom temples. It measures 31 × 41.5 meters and was built of mudbricks. According to the first excavator Shehata Adam, the temple was built by king Amenemhat I; a stela found here dates to king Senusret III and it seemed likely that the latter expanded the temple during his own reign.

The entrance was on the north side, where the walls were stronger and it seems that they formed a brick pylon. The entrance was at one time perhaps framed by inscribed limestone slabs. The proper temple stood within an open courtyard. On the west side behind the main gate there was small temple, while the main one was opposite the north entrance. Behind the entrance of the temple proper stood a courtyard with perhaps eight columns. Some stone column bases were still found. East and west of this courtyard were on either side two smaller chambers, while on the south side were three cult chapels. This temple was placed within a larger complex. On the east side were excavated remains of storage and administrative buildings.

== Settlement under the temple ==
However, the Austrian excavations showed that under the temple stretched an older settlement, which could be dated by pottery to the first half of the 12th Dynasty. The temple itself was given a new construction date at c. the mid-12th Dynasty, probably at year 5 of Senusret III, as indicated by the above-mentioned stela.

== Statues ==
In the temple, several statues of high officials and kings were found.

== See also ==
- List of ancient Egyptian sites, including sites of temples
