= Umman Manda =

Ancient Middle East people group

Umman Manda (Akkadian: 𒂟𒌋𒌋𒁕, romanized: Ummān Manda lit. 'the horde from who knows where') is a term used in the early second and first millennia BC for a poorly known people in the Ancient Near East. They have been identified in different contexts as Hurrians, Elamites, Medes, Cimmerians, and Scythians. The homeland of Umman Manda seems to be somewhere from Central Anatolia to north or northeastern Babylonia (Greater Kurdistan), possibly in what later came to be known as Mitanni, Mannae, or Media. Zaluti, whose name seems to have an Indo-Iranian etymology, is mentioned as a leader of Umman Manda. He is even suggested to be identified with Salitis the founder of the Hyksos, the Fifteenth dynasty of Egypt.

During the middle-6th century BC, the term Ummān Manda was used to designate the Cimmerians and the Scythians.

By the time of the fall of the Neo-Assyrian Empire, it was used to designate the Medes.

== Bibliography ==
- The Coming of the Greeks: Indo-European Conquests in the Aegean and the Near East, Robert Drews, Princeton University Press, 1989, ISBN 0-691-03592-X, ISBN 978-0-691-02951-1, 276 pages, see pages 226-230.
- Spalinger, Anthony J. (1978a). "The Date of the Death of Gyges and Its Historical Implications". Journal of the American Oriental Society. 98 (4): 400–409. doi:10.2307/599752. JSTOR 599752.
