= Apepi =

Ruler of Lower Egypt during the Fifteenth Dynasty

- Ipepi, Apophis
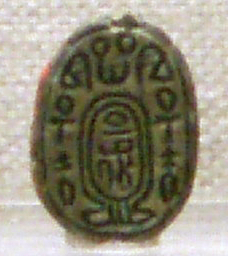
- Scarab bearing the final praenomen of the Hyksos pharaoh Apepi in Museum of Fine Arts, Boston.

Heqa-Khasut
- Reign: Year 33 (highest attestation); 35–40 years c. 1575 BC – 1540 BC
- Predecessor: Khyan or Yanassi
- Successor: Khamudi
Royal titulary
Horus name
Seheteptawy
S.ḥtp t3-wj
He who pacifies the two lands
G5	s Htp t p N17 N17
Prenomen
Nebkhepeshre
Nb-ḫpš-Rˁ
Ra is the lord of strength
M23 t L2 t < ra nb xpS >
Second prenomen: Aaqenenre
ˁ3-qnj-n-Rˁ
Great is the force of Ra
M23 t L2 t < ra aA a q n n >
Third prenomen: Aauserre
ˁ3-wsr-Rˁ
Great is the power of Ra
M23 t L2 t < ra aA Z1 a mDAt wsr s >
Nomen
Ipepi

G39 N5	i A2 p p i
- Consort: Tani (possibly)
- Children: (prince) Apepi, Herit
- Dynasty: 15th Dynasty

Apepi (Greek Apophis) was a Hyksos ruler of Lower Egypt during the Fifteenth Dynasty and the late Second Intermediate Period. He can be archaeologically associated with Tell el-Daba Stratum D/3 and the Middle Bronze IIC in the Southern Levant.

According to the Turin Canon of Kings, he reigned over the northern portion of Egypt for forty years during the early half of the 16th century BC. Although officially only in control of the Lower Kingdom, Apepi in practice dominated the majority of Egypt during the early portion of his reign. He outlived his southern rival, Kamose, but not Ahmose I.

== Name ==
=== Horus Name ===
His Horus name Shetep-tawy is attested only twice (once together with A-qenen-Re). It appears on an offering table and on blocks found at Bubastis.

=== Prenomen ===
Neb-khepesh-Re (nb ḫpš rˁ), Aa-qenen-Re (ˁ3 ḳn n rˁ) and Aa-user-Re (ˁ3 wsr rˁ) are three praenomina (throne names) used by this same ruler during various parts of his reign. While some Egyptologists once believed that there were two separate kings who bore the name Apepi, namely Aauserre Apepi and Aaqenenre Apepi, it is now recognized that Khamudi succeeded Apepi at Avaris and that there was only one king named Apepi or Apophis. Nebkhepeshre ("Re is the Lord of Strength") was Apepi's first prenomen; towards the middle of his reign, this Hyksos ruler adopted a new prenomen, Aaqenenre ("The strength of Re is great"). In the final decade or so of his reign, Apepi chose Aauserre as his last prenomen. While the prenomen was altered, there is no difference in the translation of both Aaqenenre and Aauserre.

=== Nomen ===
His Nomen was Apepi (also Ipepi; Egyptian language ipp(i)). In Greek the name became Apophis (Greek: Ἄποφις).

== Reign ==
=== Stratigraphy ===
At Tell el-Daba (Avaris, Eastern Nile Delta, Lower Egypt), the reign of Apophis can be associated with Stratum D/3 in the late Hyksos period. In the Southern Levant, this corresponds with the Middle Bronze IIC (MB IIC) from around 1600/1590 to 1550 BCE. In the Northern Levant, the Late Bronze IA started following the Hittite destruction by Mursili I around 1590 BCE with the Fall of the Great Kingdom of Yamhad (Aleppo), destruction of its vassal Ebla etc. The Hittite attacks into Syria may have triggered refugees to migrate into Canaan. At Thebes, Ahmose I came to power around 1571/1570 BCE (high chronology) and would defeat Avaris around 1560 BCE before he continued to expel the Hyksos in the Southern Levant - ending the MB IIC.

=== Foreign relations ===
Kamose, the last king of the Seventeenth Dynasty, refers to Apepi as a "Chieftain of Retjenu" in a stela that implies a Canaanite background for this Hyksos king.

While Apepi exerted suzerainty over and maintained peaceful trade relations with the native Theban Seventeenth Dynasty to the south, the other kingdom eventually regained control. The Hyksos were driven out of Egypt no more than fifteen years after his death.

=== Appropriation ===
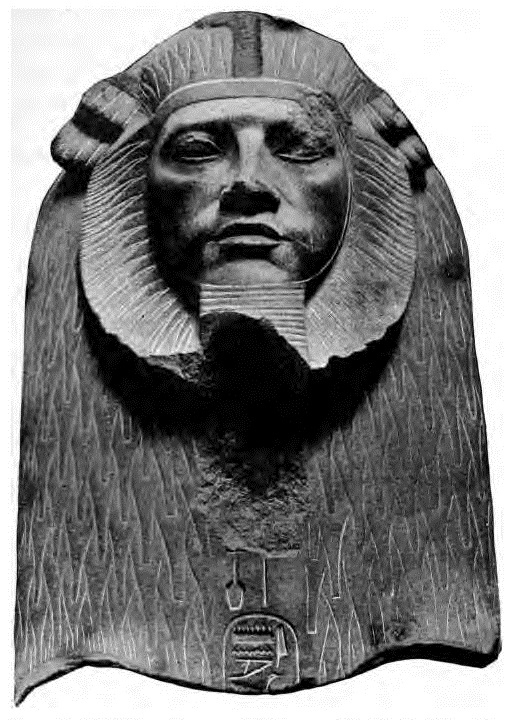
A Sphinx of Amenemhat III reinscribed in the name of Apepi, one of the so-called "Hyksos sphinxes"

Rather than building his own monuments, Apepi generally usurped the monuments of previous pharaohs by inscribing his own name over two sphinxes of Amenemhat II and two statues of Imyremeshaw. Apepi is thought to have usurped the throne of northern Egypt after the death of his predecessor, Khyan, since the latter had designated his son, Yanassi, to be his successor on the throne as a foreign ruler. He was succeeded by Khamudi, the last Hyksos ruler. Ahmose I, who drove out the Hyksos kings from Egypt, established the 18th Dynasty.

=== Extent of rule ===
There is some discussion in Egyptology concerning whether Apepi also ruled Upper Egypt. There are indeed several objects with the king's name most likely coming from Thebes and Upper Egypt. These include a dagger with the name of the king bought on the art market in Luxor. There is an axe of unknown provenance where the king is called beloved of Sobek, lord of Sumenu. Sumenu is nowadays identified with Mahamid Qibli, about 24 kilometers south of Thebes and there is a fragment of a stone vessel found in a Theban tomb. For all these objects it is arguable that they were traded to Upper Egypt. More problematic is a block with the king's name found at Gebelein. The block had been taken as evidence for building activity of the king in Upper Egypt and, hence, seen as proof that the Hyksos also ruled in Upper Egypt. However, the block is not very big and many scholars argue today, that it might have reached Gebelein after the looting of the Hyksos capital and is no proof of a Hyksos reign in Upper Egypt.

A scarab bearing the prenomen of this king was discovered in Tell el-Ajjul, Gaza Strip and catalogued by Flinders Petrie in 1933.

The Rhind Mathematical Papyrus is dated to Year 33 of Apepi. On the verso it is dated to Year 11 of an unknown ruler, thought to be Khamudi or Ahmose I.

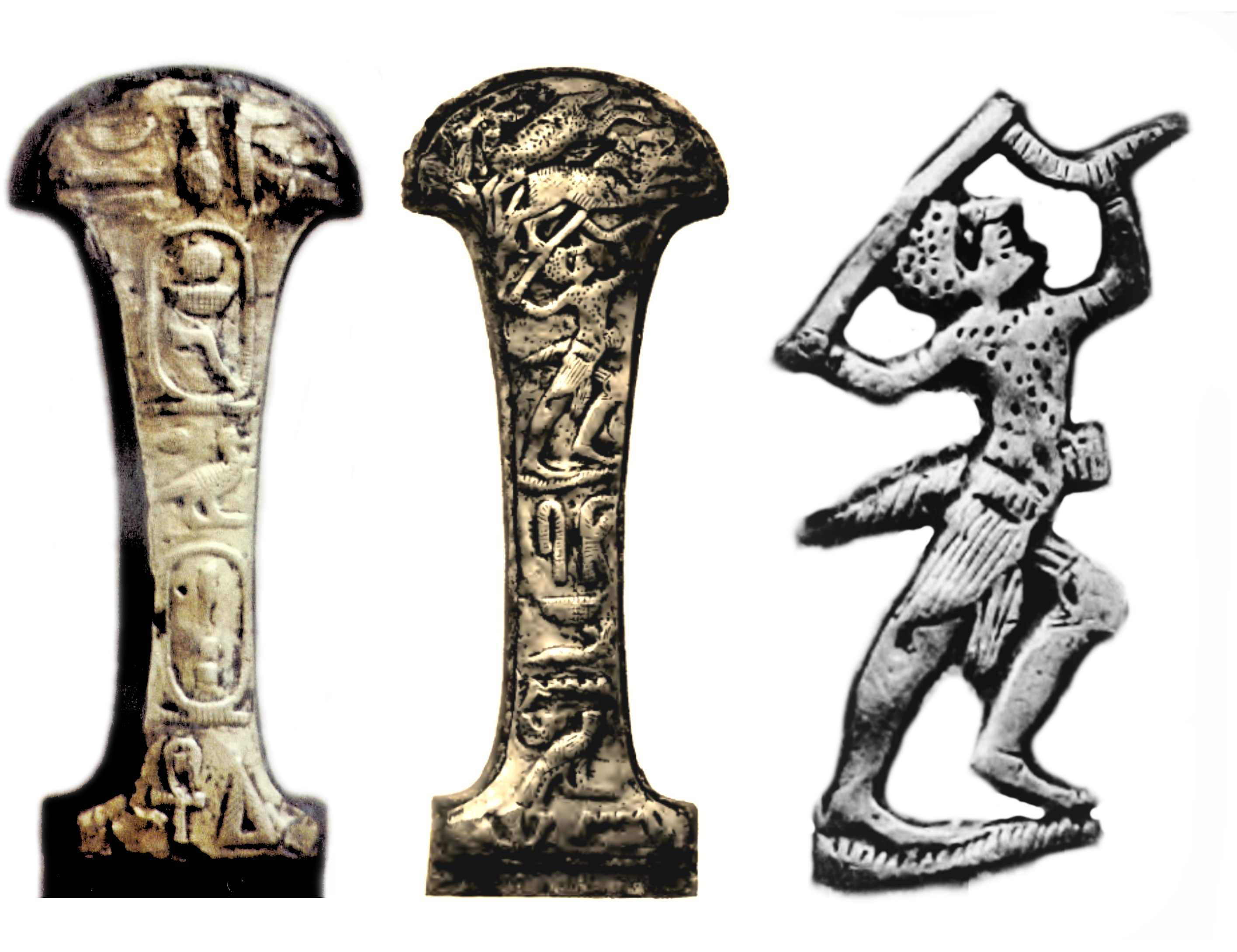
Electrum dagger handle of a soldier of Hyksos Pharaoh Apepi, illustrating the soldier hunting with a short bow and sword. Inscriptions: "The perfect god, the lord of the two lands, Nebkhepeshre Apepi" and "Follower of his lord Nehemen", found at a burial at Saqqara. Now at the Luxor Museum.

== Family ==
Two sisters are known: Tani and Ziwat. Tani is mentioned on a door of a shrine in Avaris and on the stand of an offering table (Berlin 22487). She was the sister of the king. Ziwat is mentioned on a bowl found in Spain.

A 'Prince Apepi', named on a seal (now in Berlin) is likely to have been his son. Apepi also had a daughter, named Herit: a vase belonging to her was found in a tomb at Thebes, sometimes regarded as the one of king Amenhotep I, which might indicate that at some point his daughter was married to a Theban king. The vase, however, could have been an item which was looted from Avaris after the eventual victory over the Hyksos by Ahmose I.

== Attestation ==
Attestations of Apepi has been catalogued by Ryholt 1997:385 File 15/5.

=== Nebkhepeshre ===
The first prenomen of Apophis.

- Tell el-Yehudiya (Lower Egypt): A vessel.

=== Aqenenre ===
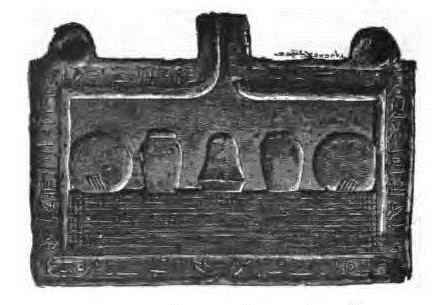
Offering table with the praenomen Aaqenenre (Cairo CG23073)

The second prenomen of Apophis.

- [Tell el-Daba (Avaris, Lower Egypt)]: An offering table with a secondary dedication to Seth, Lord of Avaris.

=== Aweserre ===
The third prenomen of Apophis.

- Almuñécar (Spain): A vase of a king's sister found in a secondary context.
- Tell el-Daba (Avaris, Lower Egypt): A shrine of king's sister.
- Dra Abu el-Naga (Upper Egypt): A vase.
- Karnak (Thebes, Upper Egypt): Stela of Kamose
- [el-Mahamid Qibli]: Adze-blade with dedication to Sobek, Lord of Semenu.
- Gebelein (Upper Egypt): An architrave.
- Thebes (Upper Egypt): Rhind Papyrus dated to Year 33 originally from Lower Egypt.
- Unknown Provenance: An offering stand of king's sister (usurped) with an original dedication to Montu, Lord of Waset (presumably from Madamud).
- Unknown Provenance: a vessel.
- Unknown Provenance: scarab-seal in gold mount
- Unknown Provenance: 9x scarab-seals

== Non-Contemporary Attestations ==
The Turin Kinglist assigns 40+ years to a Hyksos ruler who is most likely Apophis although his name is lost in a lacuna.

=== Cult of Seth ===
In the Ramesside era, Apepi is recorded as worshiping Seth in a monolatric way: "King Apophis chose for his Lord the god Seth. He didn't worship any other deity in the whole land except Seth." Jan Assmann argues that because the Ancient Egyptians could never conceive of a "lonely" god lacking personality, Seth the desert god, who was worshiped exclusively, represented a manifestation of evil; and scholars generally believe the account of Apepi's alleged monotheism is a veiled condemnation of the more infamous attempt by the later pharaoh Akhenaten to elevate the status of his patron sun god, Aten.

== See also ==
- List of pharaohs

Preceded by Khyan	Pharaoh of Egypt; Fifteenth Dynasty	Succeeded by Khamudi
