= Khamudi =

Egyptian pharaoh

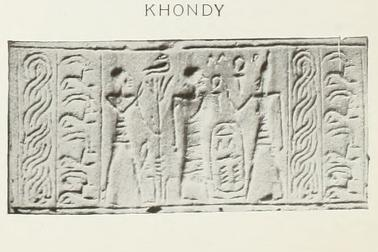
- Cylinder seal with a cartouche possibly reading "Khamudi".

Heqa-Khasut
- Reign: 1534–1522 BC (Franke), 1541–1540 BC (Ryholt)
- Predecessor: Apepi
- Successor: Ahmose I
Royal titulary
Prenomen
Uncertain
Nakhtyre
Nḫtj-Rˁ
M23 t L2 t < N5 n M3 i i >
Hotepibre (Ryholt)
Ḥtp-jb-Rˁ
M23 t L2 t < N5 Htp t p ib >
Nomen
Khamudi
ḫ3mwdi
M12 A m V1 d Z4
Turin King List: [Heka-chasut] Khamudi
[Ḥq3-ḫ3swt]-ḫ3mwdi
S38 N29 N25 X1 Z1 M12 A m V1 d Z4 T14 A1
- Dynasty: 15th Dynasty

Khamudi (also known as Khamudy) was the last Hyksos ruler of the Fifteenth Dynasty of Egypt. Khamudi came to power in 1534 BC or 1541 BC, ruling the northern portion of Egypt from his capital Avaris. His ultimate defeat at the hands of Ahmose I, after a short reign, marks the end of the Second Intermediate Period.

== Attestations ==
Khamudi is listed on the Turin canon, column 10, line 28 (Gardiner entry 10.20) as the last Hyksos king. Beyond this, only two scarab seals are firmly attributed to him, both from Jericho.

Additionally, a cylinder seal of unknown provenance but possibly from Byblos is inscribed with a cartouche which may read "Khamudi". This reading is contested by the egyptologist Kim Ryholt who proposed that the cartouche reads "Kandy" instead and refers to an hitherto unknown king. In any case, even if the cartouche bears Khamudi's name, it is believed to have been inscribed on the seal simply to fill up space rather than as an explicit reference to Khamudi. The seal is currently housed in the Petrie Museum, catalog number UC 11616.

== Reign ==
Based on the scarcity of material dating to Khamudi's reign, Ryholt has proposed that his reign must have been short, amounting to no more than a year. In this situation, Khamudi would have inherited little more than the Hyksos throne, being possibly already besieged in Sharuhen, the last Hyksos stronghold in the Negev Desert.

This is contested by other scholars, such as Manfred Bietak, who points to a year 11 of an unknown king on the Rhind Mathematical Papyrus. Bietak and many egyptologists believe that this year 11 belongs to Khamudi since the text of the papyrus refers to Ahmose I, founder of the Egyptian New Kingdom as "He of the South." As Thomas Schneider writes:

Another reign length can be inferred from the note on the verso of the Rhind Mathematical Papyrus whereby in the 11th regnal year of the ruling king, Heliopolis has been conquered, and "he of the South" has attacked and taken Sile. Since "he of the South" must denote the Theban ruler Ahmose, the regnal year 11 can only be assigned to the successor of the Hyksos king Apepi: Khamudi. The Hyksos capital Avaris will have fallen to Ahmose not much later.

Another date on the papyrus is explicitly dated to Year 33 of Khamudi's predecessor Apepi. It is generally believed that Ahmose I defeated the Hyksos king by his 18th or 19th regnal year. This is suggested by "a graffito in the quarry at Tura whereby 'oxen from Canaan' were used at the opening of the quarry in Ahmose's regnal year 22." Since the cattle could only have been brought after Ahmose's 3 to 6 years long siege of the South Canaanite town of Sharuhen which followed after the fall of Avaris, this means the reign of Khamudi must have terminated by Year 18 or 19 of Ahmose's 25-year reign at the very latest.

Regnal titles
Preceded by Apepi	Pharaoh of Egypt; Fifteenth Dynasty	Succeeded by Last king of this dynasty/First king of the next dynasty is Ahmose I
