= 1670s BC =

Decade

The 1670s BC was a decade lasting from January 1, 1679 BC to December 31, 1670 BC.

== Events and trends ==
- c. 1674 BC—End of Middle Kingdom in Ancient Egypt. Start of the Second intermediate period, the 15th–17th Dynasties.
- Egypt—Start of the Fifteenth Dynasty.
- 1674 BC—Hyksos invade Egypt.

== Significant people ==
- 1677 BC—Death of Terah, father of Abraham, according to the Hebrew Calendar
- 1675 BC—Death of Niqmi-Epuh, Great King of Yamhad, according to the Middle chronology
