= 1650s BC =

Decade

The 1650s BC was a decade lasting from January 1, 1659 BC to December 31, 1650 BC.

== Events and trends ==
- c. 1655 BC—Tan-Uli, the ruler of the Elamite Empire, dies.
- c. 1650 BC—Greeks start to live in Mycenae.
- c. 1650 BC—Middle Kingdom ends in Ancient Egypt (other date is 1674 BC).
- c. 1650 BC—Second Intermediate Period starts in Ancient Egypt (other date is 1674 BC).
- c. 1650 BC — "Flotilla" fresco, from Room 5 of West House, Akrotiri (prehistoric city), Thera, is made. Second Palace period. It is now kept in National Archaeological Museum, Athens.
- Egypt—Start of Seventeenth Dynasty.
- c. 1650 BC—Between Rapperswil and Hurden, on the so-called Seedamm, a first wooden bridge was constructed on Lake Zürich in Switzerland
- c. 1650 BC—The last Woolly mammoths die on Wrangel Island, rendering the species extinct.
- c. 1650 BC—The Rhind Mathematical Papyrus is produced.

== Significant lifeforms ==
- c.1653 BC —Alerce Milenario is estimated to have germinated this year.
