= Salitis =

Egyptian pharaoh

- Salatis, Saites
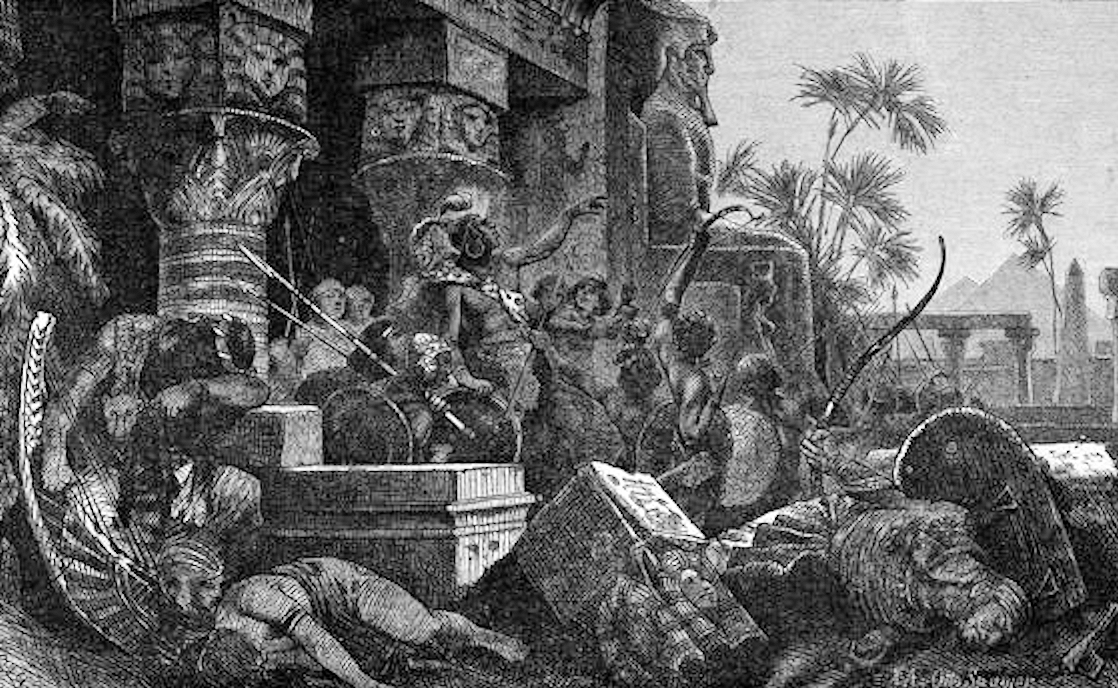
- Einfall der Hyksos ("Invasion of the Hyksos") by Hermann Vogel (c. 1880); the Hyksos invaders are imagined just after a victorious battle against the Egyptians.

Pharaoh
- Reign: around 1650 BCE
- Predecessor: Timaios (13th Dynasty?) none/founder (15th Dynasty)
- Successor: Bnon/Beon
- Dynasty: 15th Dynasty

In the Manethonian tradition, Salitis (Greek Σάλιτις, also Salatis or Saites) was the first Hyksos king, the one who subdued and ruled Lower Egypt and founded the 15th Dynasty.

== Biography ==
Salitis is mainly known from a few passages of Flavius Josephus' work Contra Apionem; for these passages, Josephus claimed to have reported Manetho's original words. It seems that during the reign of an Egyptian pharaoh called Timaios or Tutimaios, an army of foreigners suddenly came from the Near East and took over the Nile Delta without a fight. After conquering Memphis and likely deposing Timaios, the invaders committed several atrocities such as destroying cities and temples and killing or capturing the native Egyptians. After that, they

made one of their number, whose name was Salitis, king. He resided in Memphis and exacted tribute from both the upper and lower country, leaving fortresses in the most strategic places.

— Flavius Josephus, Against Apion, I: 77.

Salitis was determined to hold down his new conquests. For this reason he fortified the eastern borders, and sought a strategic position to establish an imposing stronghold from which he could dominate the independent-minded Upper Egyptians. Having found it in the city of Avaris on the east bank of the Bubastite branch of the Nile, Salitis

established this city and rendered it extremely secure with walls, settling there a large body of armed troops – as many as 240,000 men – as a frontier guard. He used to go there in the summer, partly to hand out rations and distribute pay, and partly to train them carefully in military exercises, to frighten foreigners.

— Flavius Josephus, Against Apion, I: 78–80

Salitis died after 19 years of rule and his throne passed to another Asiatic called Bnon or Beon.

== Identification ==
Several attempts have been made to identify Salitis with an archaeologically attested ruler. He was sometimes associated with a ruler named Sharek or Shalek – who is mentioned in a genealogical priestly document from Memphis – and also with the much more attested king Sheshi. German Egyptologist Jürgen von Beckerath believed that Salitis could be associated with Yakbim, another Second Intermediate Period ruler. William F. Albright suggested that Salitis may have been the same person as the Umman Manda king, Zaluti. Albright assigns "Za-a-lu-ti" an Indo-Iranian etymology. At the current state of knowledge, Salitis remains unidentified.

Even for his name there are no clues of what it could have originally meant in Egyptian, though the variant Saites used by Sextus Julius Africanus in his epitome of Manetho, might contain a reference to the deltaic city of Sais. It has been suggested that the name might be linked to shallit, a title borne by the biblical patriarch Joseph during his stay in Egypt (Genesis 42:6) with the meaning of "keeper of the power"; however, this is considered a very weak assumption.

As for him, also the identification of his Egyptian predecessor Timaios and Asiatic successor Bnon were a matter of debate; though the former was tentatively identified with Djedneferre Dedumose of the waning 13th Dynasty; this identification was questioned for being rather weak.
