= Tell el-Dab'a =

Archaeological site in Egypt

Tell el-Dab’a
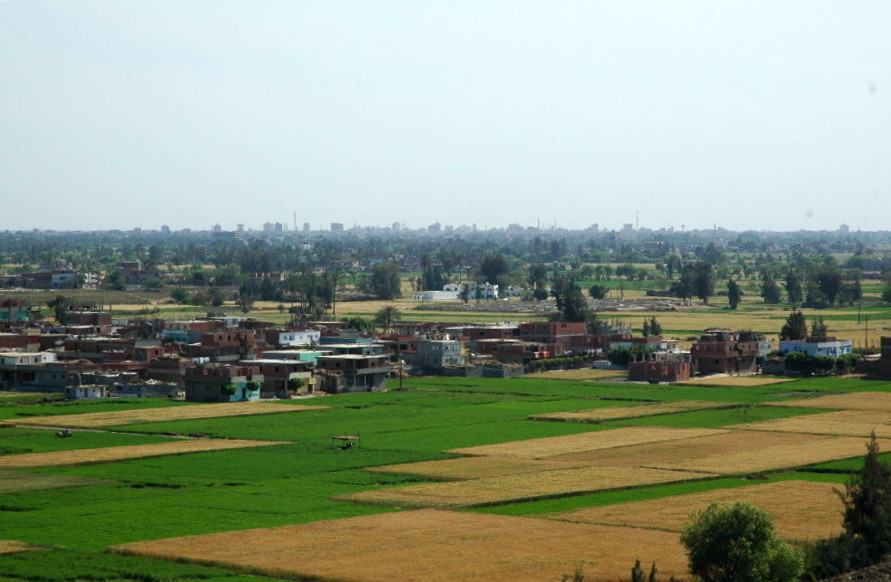
- Interactive map of Tell el-Dab’a
- 30°47′N 31°50′E
- Location: Sharqia, Egypt
- Region: Nile Delta

Tell el-Dab'a is the modern name for the ancient city of Avaris, an archaeological site in the Nile Delta region of Egypt where the capital city of the Hyksos, once stood. Avaris was ruled by Canaanites and Mesopotamians from the end of the 12th through the 13th Dynasty consisting a mixture of cultures of Near East and Egyptian. Avaris became one of the largest cities and a major capital of the Near East during the 14th Dynasty under the Hyksos King Nehesy, consisting of a large non-Egyptian population. Avaris was strategically located, becoming a military rival to the Egyptians. The Hyksos stayed militarily rivals to the Egyptians till their defeat and partial abandonment of Avaris at the end of the Second Intermediate Period when Ahmoses I reunified Egypt at the end of the 17th Dynasty and start of the New Kingdoms 18th Dynasty. Avaris still contained a large population of Asiatic/Levantine origin until its full abandonment following the construction of Pi-Ramesses under Ramesses II during the 19th Dynasty.

== Identification of the site ==
The first excavations at the site were performed in 1885 by Édouard Naville. In 1929 and again in 1939, Pierre Montet excavated a site roughly 20km north of Tell el-Dab'a, believing it was Avaris. This identification was widely accepted at the time, though it was later established that he had in fact uncovered Tanis. While excavating Tell el-Dab'a for the Egyptian Antiquities Service in 1941-1942, Labib Habachi quickly became convinced that he had rediscovered Avaris, and that Montet had mis-identified the site to its north. When a detailed study of the topography of the site and its surroundings was made by Manfred Bietak of the Austrian Archaeological Institute in the 1980s, Habachi's hypothesis was confirmed. Bietak's mission revealed that the actual Hyksos capital was indeed Tell al-Dab'a.

Recent investigations of cemeteries at Avaris have been conducted as part of thirty years of joint excavations by the Austrian Archaeological Institute of Cairo, led by Manfred Bietak, and since October 2010 by Irene Forstner-Müller. An interesting thrust of the latest investigations has to do with the historic epidemic at Avaris in 1715 BC, documented in archaeology and surviving papyrus.

The nature of civilization at Tell el-Dab’a is understood from archaeological examination of the site. Excavations have discovered buildings, namely residences, tombs, and temples, that combine Egyptian and Canaanite architectural styles. The society of Tell el-Dab’a interacted with individuals from other regions who influenced their frescos. Although the remains have been damaged by the marshy environment as well as by the continual rebuilding and agriculture on the site, archeologists have shown that this city was occupied by a wealthy society with a large sacred precinct and unusual burial practices.

From 1951 to 1954, Shehata Adam partly excavated the 12th Dynasty site of Ezbet Rushdi near Tell El-Dab'a.

== Architecture ==
=== Residences ===
Tell el-Dab’a experienced an increase in immigration during the period 1610–1590 BCE. Between 1590 and 1570 BCE, the population of Tell el-Dab’a faced overcrowding. Due to space restrictions, small houses were built in cemeteries, and children were buried in the doorways of larger houses. Tombs became incorporated into the structure of the houses.

During the early Hyksos period, members of lower social classes built their houses around their master’s house. This is not as evident during the later Hyksos Period due to the overcrowding and damage caused by agriculture. The size of the houses of Tell el-Dab’a indicates the affluence of the inhabitants. In the north-east periphery area, the houses were very small, reflecting poorer classes. In contrast, in the eastern area of Tell el-Dab’a, the remains of large houses with stairs leading to upper floors were discovered, indicating that the more wealthy members of the society lived there.

Towards the end of the Hyksos period, between 1600 and 1570 BCE, the rulers of Tell el-Dab’a felt threatened by the possibility of attack. They therefore built a thick enclosure wall around the city for defense.

=== Tombs ===
The tomb styles and methods used to bury the dead in Tell el-Dab’a were Canaanite. The tombs consist of vaulted mud-brick chambers. They reflect the belief in the afterlife of the inhabitants of Tell el-Dab’a, similar to that of the Egyptians. Grave goods were often buried with the bodies. Servant and donkey burials are recognized as remarkable burial practices of Tell el-Dab’a. The servant and donkey burials were practiced between 1680 and 1660 BCE. They were most popular during the period of Asiatic immigration at the beginning of the Hyksos reign.

The servants were not buried in the same manner as the tomb owners: the servants were buried at a different orientation in the tomb in order to show their position in the hierarchy of Tell el-Dab’a. They were buried across the tomb entrance, facing the door. This is interpreted as the servants waiting for the instructions of the tomb masters, which would be a component of the ideal life in the afterlife. Three servant burials have been found at Tell el-Dab’a. The servants appear to have been buried at the same time as the tomb owners during a servant sacrifice.

The donkey burials took place throughout the history of Tell el Dab’a. The donkeys were generally found in pairs in front of the tombs at the site. The donkeys may have been sacrificed when the tomb owner died as they were both buried at the same time. The donkeys emphasize the society’s belief in the afterlife: donkeys were closely associated with expeditions and could thus be connected with the journey between life and death.

=== Temples ===
Excavations at Tell el-Dab’a have uncovered temples that date to the Hyksos period. The temples exhibit Egyptian and Canaanite styles. By convention, the entrances of the temples are in the north wall and the temples are orientated NNW-SSE. Items such as bronze daggers, ax heads, and jugs have been found at these complexes.

The most noteworthy temple is Temple I. It is in the Egyptian style and dates to between 1680 and 1660 BCE. It contains three sanctuaries and in its courtyard, there is evidence of an altar upon which sacrifices may have been made. The outside walls were made of mud-brick that was whitewashed. Traces of blue paint have been found on the walls.

== Artistic influence ==
=== Minoan frescos ===
In 1987, thousands of fragments of Minoan wall paintings were discovered in the ancient gardens that adjoin the palace complex of Tell el-Dab’a, on the site of a fortress of the early New Kingdom. The fragments show techniques, subjects, and styles that are characteristic of Minoan frescos. The frescos were applied as buon fresco, a defining aspect of Minoan works. They include scenes of maze-like patterns, bulls and bull-leapers, the flying gallop, griffins, and leopard and lion hunts, images associated with the Minoan artistic culture. The Minoan wall paintings from Tell el-Dab’a therefore show that the early 18th dynasty rulers were open to works and themes from the eastern Mediterranean. The Hyksos and Minoan societies were in contact, potentially through itinerant artists who transferred Minoan technology to Tell el-Dab’a. The population of Tell el-Dab’a may have also included Aegean families, resulting in direct connections between Aegean and Egyptian art.

The bull-leaping scenes depicted on the fresco fragments are considered to be indistinguishable from those found in Minoan palaces. The theme of bull leaping is identified in particular with Knossos, Crete. The fresco was painted in the Minoan bull-leaping fresco style: a dark-skinned individual with dark, wavy hair wearing Minoan-style clothing, namely the kilt, boots, and armbands, is depicted performing a flip over a bull’s back.

Nanno Marinatos tentatively formed a two-fold scene of the lion and leopard hunting fragments in 1994. Leopards are depicted hunting deer against a red background in the upper scene of the fresco while lions chasing an ibex is illustrated in the lower region. Other fragments show boots. It was thus deduced that a hunting scene was depicted. In addition, Bietak included a photograph of a leopard in his work that shows its rear parts. The animal’s legs and tail are fully extended in the flying gallop pose in order to show motion, a common representational technique of Minoan art.

=== Cypriot pottery ===
Approximately 500 pieces of Cypriot pottery, containing oil and perfume, were discovered at Tell el-Dab’a. Pendent Line, Cross Line, and White Painted V styles of White Painted Cypriot pottery compose the largest component of exported pottery to Tell el-Dab’a, indicating that Tell el-Dab’a had trade relations with Cyprus. The majority of the exported pieces were of the “broad band” tradition. A single rim fragment from a jar of the White Painted V Fine Line Style was found at the site.

The Hyksos citadel must have been constructed towards the end of the Hyksos Period (ph. D/2), as fragments of Cypriot Bichrome Ware have been found in sand dumps deposited in order to raise the land for the construction.

== Other important finds ==
=== Weighing stones ===
In the Second Intermediate Period graves were uncovered sets of sphendonoid weighing stones, confirming the use of shekel weighing system, both "Syrian" (c. 9-9.5 g) and "Mesopotamian" (c. 8.1-8.5 g). Here presumably stems the changed weighing system of the New Kingdom, with a completely different deben unit than in previous periods.

== Ezbet Rushdi ==
Ezbet Rushdi is a small village about 1 km north-east of Tell el-Daba. A temple and a settlement of the Middle Kingdom period have been discovered there by recent excavations. The report on the excavations was published in 2015.

Previously excavated by Shehata Adam, who discovered a temple east of the village, the Austrian Archaeological Institute re-excavated the site in 1996. It was discovered that, prior to the construction of the temple, there was already an early 12th dynasty settlement there.

== See also ==
- Tanis
- Tell el-Ajjul
