= Fifteenth Dynasty of Egypt =

Ancient Egyptian dynasty

- 1650 BC–c. 1550 BC
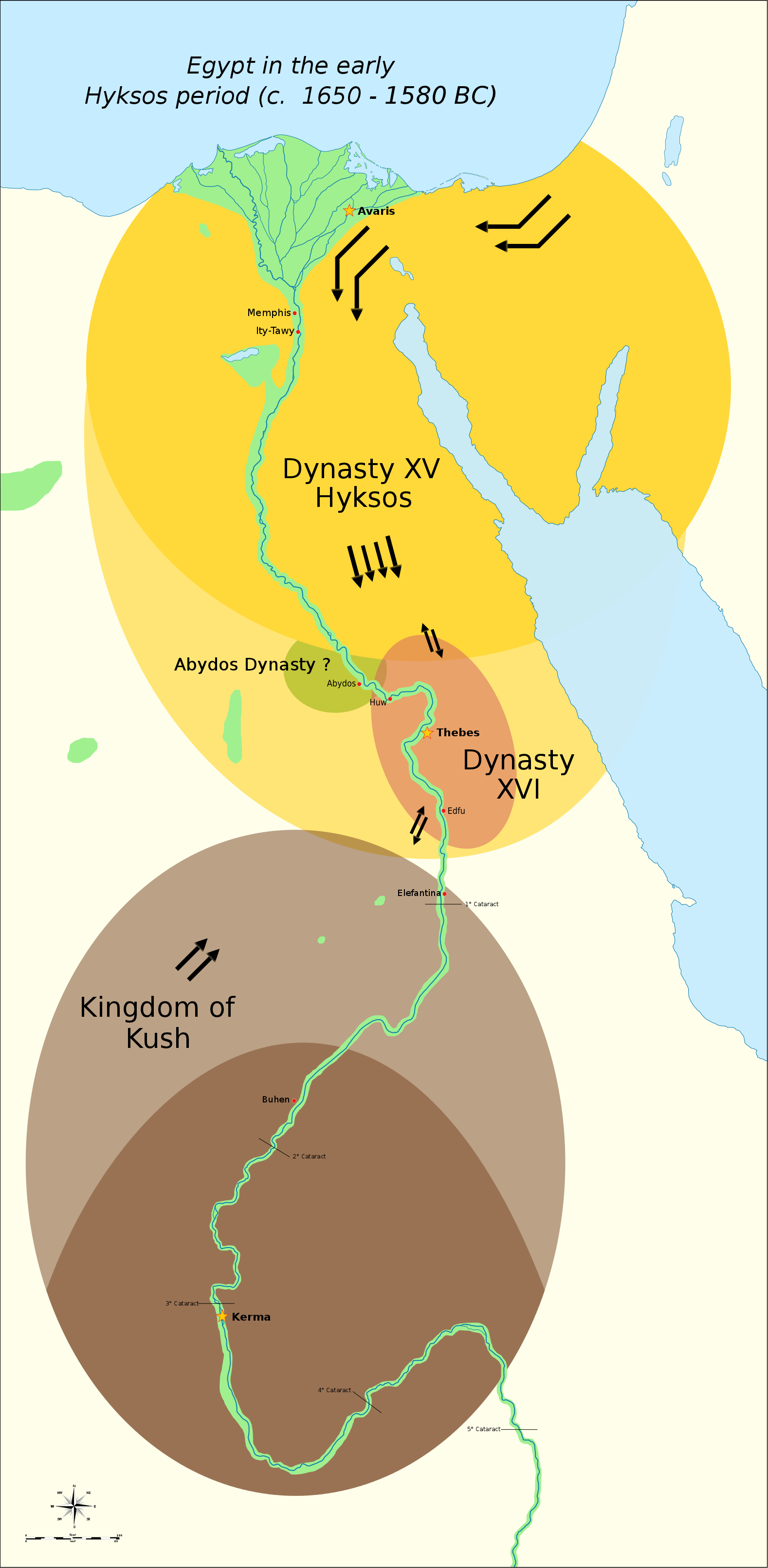
- Egypt during the Fifteenth Dynasty
- Capital: Avaris
- Common languages: Egyptian language
- Religion: ancient Egyptian religion
- Government: Absolute monarchy
- Historical era: Second Intermediate Period of Egypt
  - Established: 1650 BC
  - Disestablished: c. 1550 BC
Preceded by
Fourteenth Dynasty of Egypt
Thirteenth Dynasty of Egypt
Sixteenth Dynasty of Egypt
Abydos Dynasty
Succeeded by
Eighteenth Dynasty of Egypt

The Fifteenth Dynasty was a foreign dynasty of ancient Egypt. It was founded by Salitis, a Hyksos from West Asia whose people had invaded the country and conquered Lower Egypt. The 15th, 16th, and 17th Dynasties of ancient Egypt are often combined under the group title, Second Intermediate Period. The 15th Dynasty dates approximately from 1650 to 1550 BC.

== Dynastic history ==
The kings of the Fifteenth Dynasty are said to have been Canaanite. Pharaoh Kamose is known to have referred to Apophis, one of the kings of the dynasty, as "Chieftain of Retjenu (i.e. Caanan)". The kings of the Fifteenth Dynasty formed "the second Asiatic Kingdom in the Delta", covering an area which may have included Canaan itself, although the archaeological record is sparse. The dynasty probably lasted for a period of about 108 years.

The first king, also described as a Hyksos (ḥḳꜣw-ḫꜣswt, a "shepherd" according to Africanus), led his people into an occupation of the Nile Delta area and settled his capital at Avaris. These events put an end to the Fourteenth Dynasty of Egypt. There is no evidence of conflict at that time however, and the settling of the Canaanite populations could have occurred rather peacefully in the power vacuum left by the disintegration of the Fourteenth Dynasty. Subsequent relations with Egyptian polities, however, were marked with violent conflict.

=== Identity ===
The people of Avaris in the Nile Delta were called Aamu by the Egyptians, which was also the term used to designate the inhabitants of Syria, or the enemies of Ramses II at the battle of Kadesh. This has generally been translated as "Western Asiatics" by Egyptologists.

The term Hyksos was traditionally used to designate foreign chieftains, and more specifically "rulers of the Asiatics", already before the Fifteenth Dynasty and also after it. It was not an official title of the rulers of the Fifteenth dynasty, and is never encountered together with royal titulature, except in one rare instance in an inscription from Tell el-Dab'a mentioning an unknown king and describing him as a Hyksos. "Hyksos" was rather a generic term which is encountered separately from royal titulature, and in regnal lists after the end of the Fifteenth Dynasty itself. In another instance, Khyan is thought to have used the title "Hyksos" early in his reign, and then abandoned it for traditional Egyptian titulature when he invaded the whole of Egypt. Only the first four kings of the Fifteenth Dynasty are known to have used the naming "Hyksos", and after that royal titulature becomes purely Egyptian.

=== Territorial extent ===
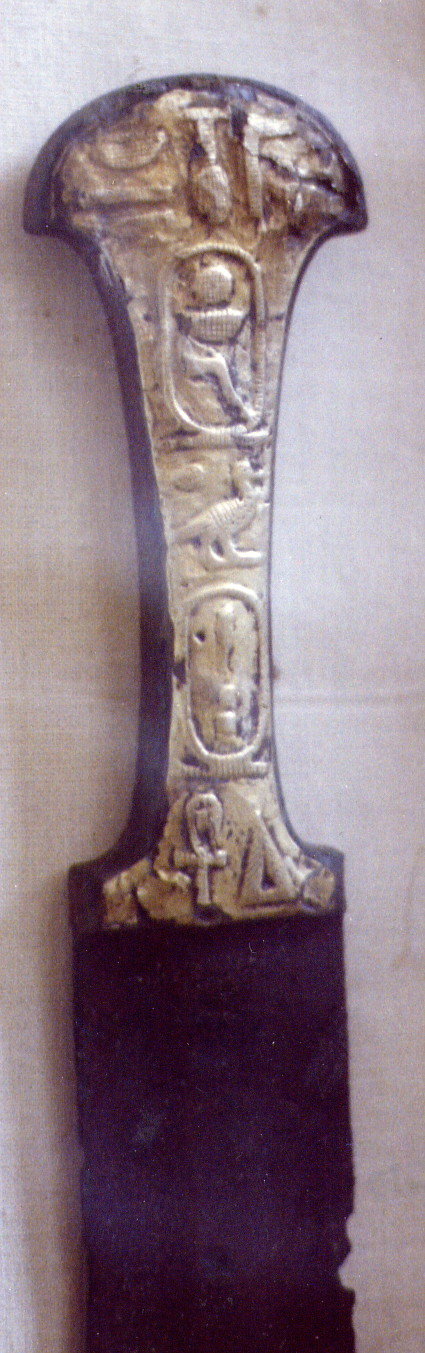
Dagger in the name of Apophis

Regular conflicts continued with the Egyptian dynasties to the south, the Sixteenth Dynasty, the Abydos Dynasty and the Seventeenth Dynasty, with short intervals of peace during which there were some relations with Nubia. Soon after the occupation of the Nile Delta, where it replaced the Fourteenth Dynasty, the Fifteenth Dynasty expanded to occupy Memphis, leading to the fall of the Thirteenth Dynasty at Memphis. As Egyptian political power disintegrated at Memphis, new dynasties arose in the south, the Abydos Dynasty and the Sixteenth Dynasty at Thebes.

The Fifteenth Dynasty at one point, after a period of about 20 years since its foundation, extended its rule as far south as Thebes, entering into conflict with Pharaoh Neferhotep III. The whole of Egypt was conquered during the reign of Khayan. The Abydos Dynasty also vanished on the occasion of these southern conquests. Numerous monuments from conquered areas were brought north to the capital of Avaris, and many were marked with additional inscriptions, especially by Apophis. All of this is contested however. For Alexander Ilin-Tomich, the territory directly ruled by the Hyksos kings of Avaris was likely confined to the eastern Delta and the nature and extent of their control over Middle Egypt remains unclear.

The Fifteenth Dynasty eventually ended with the conquest of Avaris by the Pharaoh Ahmose I.

=== Trade ===
The trading relations of the Fifteenth Dynasty were mainly with Canaan and Cyprus. Trade with Canaan is said to have been "intensive", especially with many imports of Canaanite wares, and may have reflected the Canaanite origins of the dynasty. According to the Kamose stelae, the Hyksos imported "charriots and horses, ships, timber, gold, lapis lazuli, silver, turquoise, bronze, axes without number, oil, incense, fat and honey". The Fifteenth Dynasty also exported large quantities of material looted from southern Egypt, especially Egyptian sculptures, to the areas of Canaan and Syria. These transfers of Egyptian artifacts to the Near East may especially be attributed to king Apophis. Trade relations with Cyprus were also very important.

=== Religion ===
The relation of the Fifteenth Dynasty to Egyptian religious traditions was ambiguous, and they are said by commentators on the Eighteenth Dynasty that "they ruled without acknowledging Re". The dynasty is recorded as having destroyed Egyptian monuments and removed Egyptian statuary for booty, as well as plundering royal tombs, Ahmose complaining that "pyramids have been torn down".

== Rulers ==
Known rulers of the 15th Dynasty are as follows:

Fifteenth Dynasty
Name	Image	Dates and comments
Salitis		Mentioned by Manetho as first king of the dynasty; currently unidentified with any known archaeologically attested person. Ruled for 19 years according to Manetho, as quoted by Josephus.
Semqen		According to Ryholt, he was an early Hyksos ruler, possibly the first king of the dynasty; von Beckerath assigns him to the 16th dynasty.
Aperanat		According to Ryholt, he was an early Hyksos ruler, possibly the second king of the dynasty; von Beckerath assigns him to the 16th dynasty.
Khyan		Ruled 10+ years. He was named as a Hyksos king in his surviving monuments and seal impressions.
Yanassi		Khyan's eldest son, possibly at the origin of the mention of a king Iannas in Manetho's Aegyptiaca
Sakir-Har		Named as an Hyksos king on a doorjamb found at Avaris. Regnal order uncertain.
Apophis		c. 1590?–1550 BC; Ruled 40+ years.
Khamudi		c. 1550–1540 BC

The 15th Dynasty of Egypt was the first Hyksos dynasty, ruling from Avaris, without control of the entire land. The Hyksos preferred to stay in northern Egypt since they infiltrated from the north-east. The names and order of kings are uncertain. The Turin King list indicates that there were six Hyksos kings, with an obscure Khamudi listed as the final king of the 15th Dynasty.

=== Number of kings named Apepi ===
Some scholars argue there were two Apophis kings named Apepi, but this is primarily because there are two known prenomens for this king: Awoserre and Aqenenre. However, the Danish Egyptologist Kim Ryholt maintains in his study of the Second Intermediate Period that these prenomens all refer to one man: Apepi I, who ruled Egypt for 40+X years. This is also supported by this king's employment of a third prenomen during his reign: Nebkhepeshre. Apophis likely employed different prenomens over the course of several periods of his reign. This scenario is not without precedent or parallel, since several kings, including Mentuhotep II, the famous Ramesses II, and Seti II, are known to have used two different prenomens during their reigns.

== Comparison of regnal lists ==
The fifteenth dynasty was often excluded from Egyptian king lists due to being perceived as usurpers by Egyptians in later times. The Turin King List originally listed six "rulers of foreign lands", but the list itself is in a very fragmentary state and much of the information is now lost. Manetho's now-lost work Aegyptiaca, as quoted by Sextus Julius Africanus, originally listed six "shepherd kings from Phoenicia" and gave individual reign lengths of each king.

Historical Pharaoh	Turin King List	Manetho	Reign Length		
Historical Pharaoh	Turin King List	Manetho	Turin List	Manetho (Africanus)	Manetho (Josephus)
Salitis	Name lost	Salitis	Lost	19 years	13 years
Semqen?	Name lost	Beon	Lost	44 years	44 years
Aperanat	Name lost	Apakhnas	Lost	61 years	36 years and 7 months
Khyan	Name lost	–	10+ years	–	–
Apepi	Name lost	Apophis	40+ years	50 years	61 years
Yanassi	–	Iannas	–	49 years	50 years and 1 month
Sakir-Har?	–	Assis	–	49 years	49 years and 2 months
Khamudi	Khamudy	–	Lost	–	–
			140/160/180+ years	284 years	253 years and 10 months

== Bibliography ==
- Kim Ryholt, The Political Situation in Egypt during the Second Intermediate Period c. 1800-1550 B.C." by Museum Tuscalanum Press (ISBN 87-7289-421-0)

Preceded by Fourteenth Dynasty	Dynasty of Egypt; 1650−1550 BC	Succeeded by Sixteenth Dynasty
