= Khamure =

Egyptian pharaoh of the 14th dynasty

- Kho-Ra
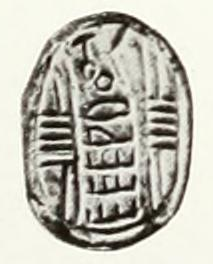
- Scarab of Khamure photographed by Flinders Petrie and now in the Petrie Museum

Pharaoh
- Reign: unknown duration
- Predecessor: unknown
- Successor: unknown
Royal titulary
Nomen
Khamure
Ḫˁ-mw-Rˁ
nTr nfr N5 N28 a n n n
- Dynasty: uncertain, possibly 14th dynasty

Khamure was a ruler of some part of Egypt during the Second Intermediate Period, possibly during the 17th century BC, and likely belonging to the 14th Dynasty. As such he would have ruled from Avaris over the eastern Nile Delta and possibly over the Western Delta as well. His chronological position and identity are unclear.

== Attestations ==
Khamure is one of the few attested kings of the 14th Dynasty with two scarab seals attributable to him, both of unknown provenance. One of the two scarabs is currently housed in the Petrie Museum, under the catalog number 11819, while the other was sold at an auction at Lotte New York Palace Hotel in December 1991.

The Petrie Museum scarab is peculiar in that it has a unique and elaborate decoration on its back indicating that it was given to an official of the highest rank. The scarab is inscribed with the name of Khamure preceded by the epithet Netjer Nefer, "the good god", showing that Khamure was this king's prenomen. This means that Khamure is not listed in the surviving fragments of the Turin canon, a king list dating to the Ramesside period and recording the prenomina of the kings.

== Identity ==
The archaeologists Olga Tufnell and William A. Ward argue that the name written on the scarab seal of the Petrie Museum is actually "'Ammu", possibly to be identified with 'Ammu Aahotepre, a shadowy king of the Second Intermediate Period. The Egyptologists Kim Ryholt and Darrell Baker reject this reading, since Gardiner's sign N5 for the sun-disk is present on the seal. Percy Newberry agrees that Khamure is the correct reading of the scarab.

Although the chronological position of Khamure remains uncertain, Ryholt has proposed that he ruled in the 14th Dynasty, some time before Yaqub-Har and Yakareb. This estimation is based on a seriation of the scarabs dating to the Second Intermediate Period.
