= 'Apepi =

Ruler of a part of Lower Egypt

- Apepi I, Ip[...]
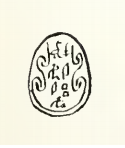
- Scarab of "king's son Apepi", who may be 'Apepi

Pharaoh
- Reign: unknown duration
- Predecessor: 'A[...] (Ryholt & von Beckerath)
- Successor: unknown (Ryholt), Hibe (von Beckerath)
Royal titulary
Prenomen
'Apepi
Ipepi
i A2 p p i
Turin King List: 'Ap[epi]
Ip...
M23 t L2 t < i A2 p HASH >
- Dynasty: uncertain, possibly late 14th dynasty (Ryholt) or late 16th Dynasty (von Beckerath)

'Apepi was a ruler of some part of Lower Egypt during the Second Intermediate Period c. 1650 BC. According to the egyptologists Kim Ryholt and Darrell Baker, 'Apepi was the fifty-first ruler of the 14th Dynasty. As such he would have ruled from Avaris over the eastern Nile Delta and possibly over the Western Delta as well. Alternatively, Jürgen von Beckerath sees 'Apepi as a member of the late 16th Dynasty and a vassal of the Hyksos rulers of the 15th Dynasty.

== Attestation ==
'Apepi's only secure attestation is the Turin canon, a king list redacted in the Ramesside period. 'Apepi is listed on a fragment of the document corresponding to column 10, row 15 (column 9 row 16 as per Alan H. Gardiner's reconstruction of the Turin canon). The chronological position of 'Apepi cannot be ascertained beyond doubt due to the fragile and fragmentary state of the canon. Furthermore, the document preserves only the beginning of 'Apepi's prenomen as "'Ap[...]". which, Ryholt argues, may be restored to "'Apepi".

== King's son Apophis ==
Ryholt's reconstruction of the name of 'Apepi is significant because five scarab seals inscribed with "King's son Apophis" are known. On two of these seals the inscription is furthermore enclosed in a cartouche and followed by di-ˁnḫ meaning "given life". These two attributes are normally reserved to kings or designated heirs to the throne and 'Apepi could be the Apophis referred to on the seals. Tentatively confirming this attribution, Ryholt notes that both scarabs can be dated on stylistic grounds to the 14th Dynasty, between the reigns of Sheshi and Yaqub-Har.
