= Shenshek =

Egyptian pharaoh of the 14th dynasty

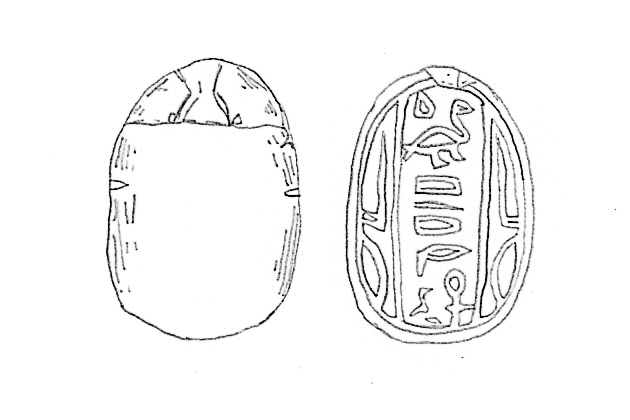
- Scarab seal of Shenshek. Egyptian Museum (TD-6160[50])

Pharaoh
- Reign: unknown duration
- Predecessor: unknown
- Successor: unknown
Royal titulary
Nomen
Shenshek
Šnšk
The rescuer ?
G39 N5 N37 n N37 k
- Dynasty: uncertain, possibly 14th Dynasty

Shenshek was a ruler of some part of Egypt during the Second Intermediate Period, possibly during the 17th century BC, and likely belonging to the 14th Dynasty. As such he would have ruled from Avaris over the eastern Nile Delta and possibly over the western Delta as well. His chronological position and identity are unclear.

== Attestation ==
Shenshek is known from a single scarab discovered in Avaris, modern Tell el-Dab'a, by the Egyptologist Manfred Bietak. The scarab is now in the Egyptian Museum, catalog number TD-6160[50].

== Identity ==
The primary historical source for the identification and chronological position of the rulers of the 14th Dynasty is the Turin canon, a king list compiled during the Ramesside period.

The identification of Shenshek with one of the names on the list is difficult because the Turin canon only records the kings' prenomen while Shenshek is a nomen. Although the Egyptologists Darrell Baker and Kim Ryholt deem it likely that Shenshek is indeed recorded on the list, its identification will remain conjectural until an artefact bearing both Shenshek's nomen and prenomen is found.

After his discovery of the seal, Bietak proposed that Shenshek is a variant of the name of king Maaibre Sheshi, whose chronological position is somewhat unclear but who could also belong to the 14th Dynasty. This hypothesis is rejected by Baker and Ryholt. Based on a seriation of the scarab-seals of the Second Intermediate Period, Ryholt proposed that Shenshek reigned after Nehesy and before Yaqub-Har.
