= Sheneh (pharaoh) =

Egyptian pharaoh of the 14th dynasty

- Shenes, Shens
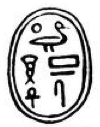
- Scarab Aberdeen 21048 of Sheneh, 1906 drawing by Percy E. Newberry.

Pharaoh
- Reign: unknown duration
- Predecessor: unknown
- Successor: unknown
Royal titulary
Nomen
Sheneh
Š-n-ḥ
G39 N5 N37 n V28
- Dynasty: uncertain, possibly 14th dynasty

Sheneh was a ruler of some part of Egypt during the Second Intermediate Period, possibly during the 17th century BC, and likely belonging to the 14th Dynasty. As such he would have ruled from Avaris over the eastern Nile Delta and possibly over the Western Delta as well. His chronological position and identity are unclear.

== Attestations ==
Sheneh is one of the few attested kings of the 14th Dynasty with three scarabs attributable to him. None of those scarabs are of known provenance however, which hampers research on Sheneh's kingdom. One scarab is currently in the British Museum, another in Aberdeen, catalogue number 21048, and the third one is in Moscow cat. nu. 2258.

The Moscow scarab of Sheneh exhibits a type of border decoration with representation of a rope, which was in use only in scarabs of officials of the 13th Dynasty and for king Sheshi and his son Ipqu, possibly dating to the early 14th Dynasty. Thus Sheneh may have ruled in the early 14th Dynasty as well, under an unknown prenomen which could be listed in the Turin canon.

== Identity ==
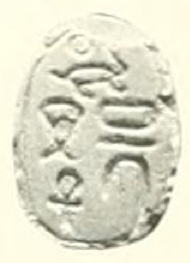
Scarab of Sheneh, now in the British Museum BM EA 32392.

Sheneh is comparatively well attested for a 14th Dynasty ruler and the Egyptologist Kim Ryholt consequently proposes that he may be identifiable to either Sehebre or Merdjefare. Indeed Sehebre and Merdjefare reigned for three to four years each, the longest reigns of the dynasty, and are otherwise poorly attested.

The name of Sheneh has sometimes been translated as Shenes due to a misreading of the signs for given life, an epithet commonly given to kings.

== See also ==
- List of pharaohs
