= Nuya =

Egyptian pharaoh of the 14th dynasty

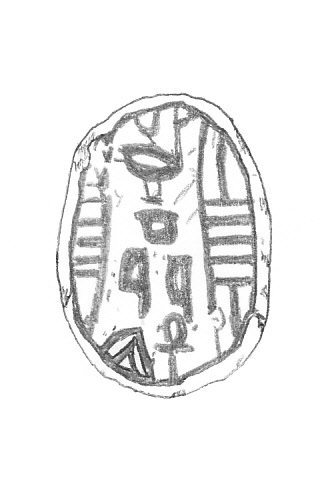
- Scarab seal of Nuya

Pharaoh
- Reign: unknown duration
- Predecessor: unknown
- Successor: unknown
Royal titulary
Nomen
Nuya
Nw-y
G39 N5 W24 i i
- Dynasty: uncertain, possibly 14th dynasty

Nuya was a ruler of some part of Lower Egypt during the Second Intermediate Period, possibly during the 17th century BC. Nuya is attested by a single scarab seal of unknown provenance. Based on a seriation of the seals of the Second Intermediate Period, the Danish Egyptologist Kim Ryholt has proposed that Nuya was a king of the 14th Dynasty, reigning after Nehesy and before Yaqub-Har. As such, he would have ruled in the 17th century BC from Avaris over the eastern Nile Delta and possibly over the Western Delta as well.

Alternatively, the Egyptologists Erik Hornung and Elisabeth Staehelin read the inscription on the scarab attributed to Nuya as Khyan, the name of a powerful Hyksos king of the 15th Dynasty c. 1610–1580 BC. This reading is emphatically rejected by the Egyptologist Darrell Baker however, who remains cautious about Nuya's identity.
