= Bebnum =

Poorly known Ancient Egyptian king

- Babnum, Bebnem, Babnem

Pharaoh
- Reign: some time between 1690 BC and 1649 BC (Ryholt)
- Predecessor: Nebnati Djedkare (Ryholt and von Beckerath)
- Successor: uncertain, unknown (Ryholt) or Nebmaare (von Beckerath)
Royal titulary
Prenomen
[...]kare
...k3-Rˁ
... the Ka of Ra
M23 t L2 t < N5 HASH HASH kA Z1 R13 >
Nomen
Bebnum
Bbnm
b b n Z2 m A1
- Dynasty: uncertain dynasty, most likely 14th Dynasty, otherwise 16th Dynasty

Bebnum (also Babnum) is a poorly known ruler of Lower Egypt during the Second Intermediate Period, reigning in the early or mid 17th century BC.

== Chronological position ==
According to Jürgen von Beckerath he was the 14th king of the 16th Dynasty and a vassal of the Hyksos kings of the 15th Dynasty. This opinion was recently rejected by Kim Ryholt. In his 1997 study of the Second Intermediate Period, Ryholt argues that the kings of the 16th Dynasty ruled an independent Theban realm c. 1650–1580 BC. Consequently, Ryholt sees Bebnum, who bears a Semitic name, as the 34th king of the 14th Dynasty which regroups kings of Canaanite descent. As such Bebnum would have ruled from Avaris over the eastern Nile Delta concurrently with the Memphis-based 13th Dynasty.

This analysis has convinced some Egyptologists, such as Darrell Baker and Janine Bourriau, but not others including Stephen Quirke.

== Attestation ==
Bebnum is only attested by an isolated fragment of the Turin canon, a king list redacted in the Ramesside period and which serves as the primary historical source for kings of the second intermediate period. The fact that the fragment on which Bebnum figures is not attached to the rest of the document made its chronological position difficult to ascertain. However an analysis of the fibers of the papyrus led Ryholt to place the fragment on the 9th column, row 28 of the canon (Gardiner entry 9.30).
