= Sheshi =

Egyptian pharaoh

Maaibre Sheshi
- Sheshy, Shesha, Mayebre
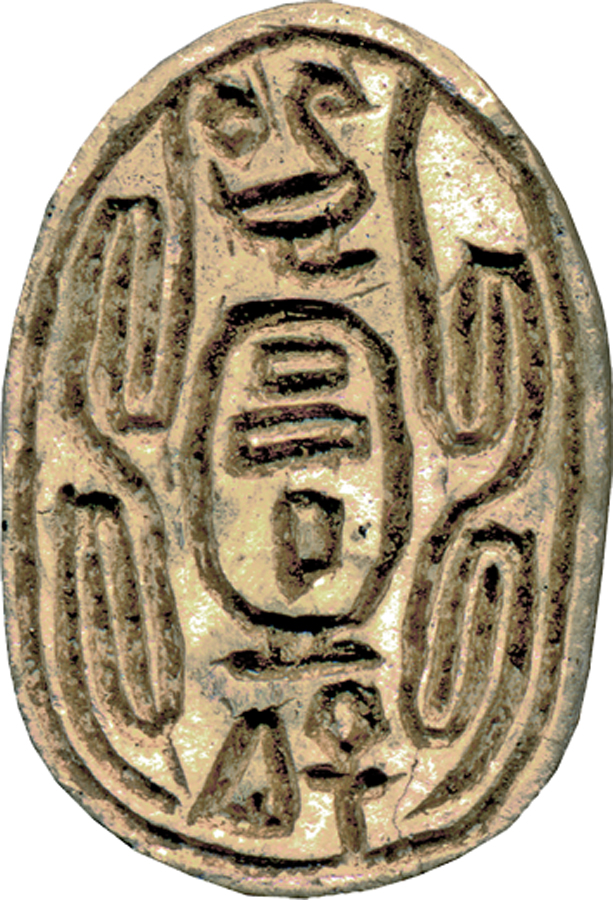
- Scarab seal inscribed with "the son of Ra, Sheshi, given life"

Pharaoh
- Reign: duration highly uncertain: three years, (Note: William C. Hayes gives the reign of Sheshi as three years c. 1675 BC.) 19 years, (Note: Identifying Sheshi with Salitis/Saites, founder of the 15th Dynasty according to the Aegyptiaca.) c. 40 years. (Note: Ryholt dates the reign of Sheshi to 1745–1705 BC.)
- Coregency: Conjectural coregency with Nehesy (Ryholt)
- Predecessor: uncertain, Ammu Aahotepre
- Successor: uncertain, Nehesy Aasehre, Yaqub-Har
Royal titulary
Prenomen
Maaibre
M3ˁ-jb-Rˁ
The righteous one is the heart of Ra
M23 t L2 t < ra U4 a ib >
Nomen
Sheshi
Ššj

G39 N5	S S i
- Consorts: uncertain, Tati (Ryholt)
- Children: uncertain, Nehesy ♂, Ipqu ♂ (Ryholt)
- Dynasty: 14th or 15th

Maaibre Sheshi (also Sheshy) was a ruler of areas of Egypt during the Second Intermediate Period. The dynasty, chronological position, duration and extent of his reign are uncertain and subject to ongoing debate. The difficulty of identification is mirrored by problems in determining events from the end of the Middle Kingdom to the arrival of the Hyksos in Egypt. Nonetheless, Sheshi is, in terms of the number of artifacts attributed to him, the best-attested king of the period spanning the end of the Middle Kingdom and the Second Intermediate period; roughly from c. 1800 BC until 1550 BC. Hundreds of scaraboid seals bearing his name have been found throughout the Levant, Egypt, Nubia, and as far away as Carthage, where some were still in use 1,500 years after his death.

Three competing hypotheses have been put forth for the dynasty to which Sheshi belonged. The first hypothesis is supported by Egyptologists such as Nicolas Grimal, William C. Hayes, and Donald B. Redford, who believe that he should be identified with Salitis, founder of the 15th Dynasty according to historical sources and king of the Hyksos during their invasion of Egypt. Salitis is credited with 19 years of reign and would have lived sometime between c. 1720 BC and 1650 BC. The second hypothesis is supported by Egyptologist William Ayres Ward and the archaeologist Daphna Ben-Tor, who propose that Sheshi was a Hyksos king and belongs to the second half of the 15th Dynasty, reigning between Khyan and Apophis. Alternatively, Manfred Bietak has proposed that Sheshi was a vassal of the Hyksos, ruling over some part of Egypt or Canaan. The very existence of such vassals is debated. The final hypothesis says Sheshi could be a ruler of the early 14th Dynasty, a line of kings of Canaanite descent ruling over of the Eastern Nile Delta immediately before the arrival of the Hyksos. Proponents of this theory, such as Kim Ryholt and Darrell Baker, credit Sheshi with 40 years of reign starting ca. 1745 BC.

Ryholt proposed that Sheshi allied his kingdom with the Kushites in Nubia via a dynastic marriage with the Nubian princess Tati. Ryholt further posits that the son of Sheshi and Tati was Nehesy, whose name means "The Nubian", whom he believes succeeded Sheshi to the throne as the pharaoh Nehesy Aasehre.

== Attestations ==
=== Nomen and prenomen on seals ===
The nomen of Sheshi (Note: The meaning of Sheshi is uncertain, it could be the diminutive of another name.) is inscribed on over two hundred scarab seals, which constitute the sole attestations of his reign. The number of scarabs attributed to Sheshi is paralleled in number only by those bearing the prenomen Maaibre, meaning "The righteous one is the heart of Ra". Based on the close stylistic similarities between both groups of scarabs as well as their otherwise unmatched numbers, the consensus among Egyptologists is that Maaibre was the prenomen of Sheshi.

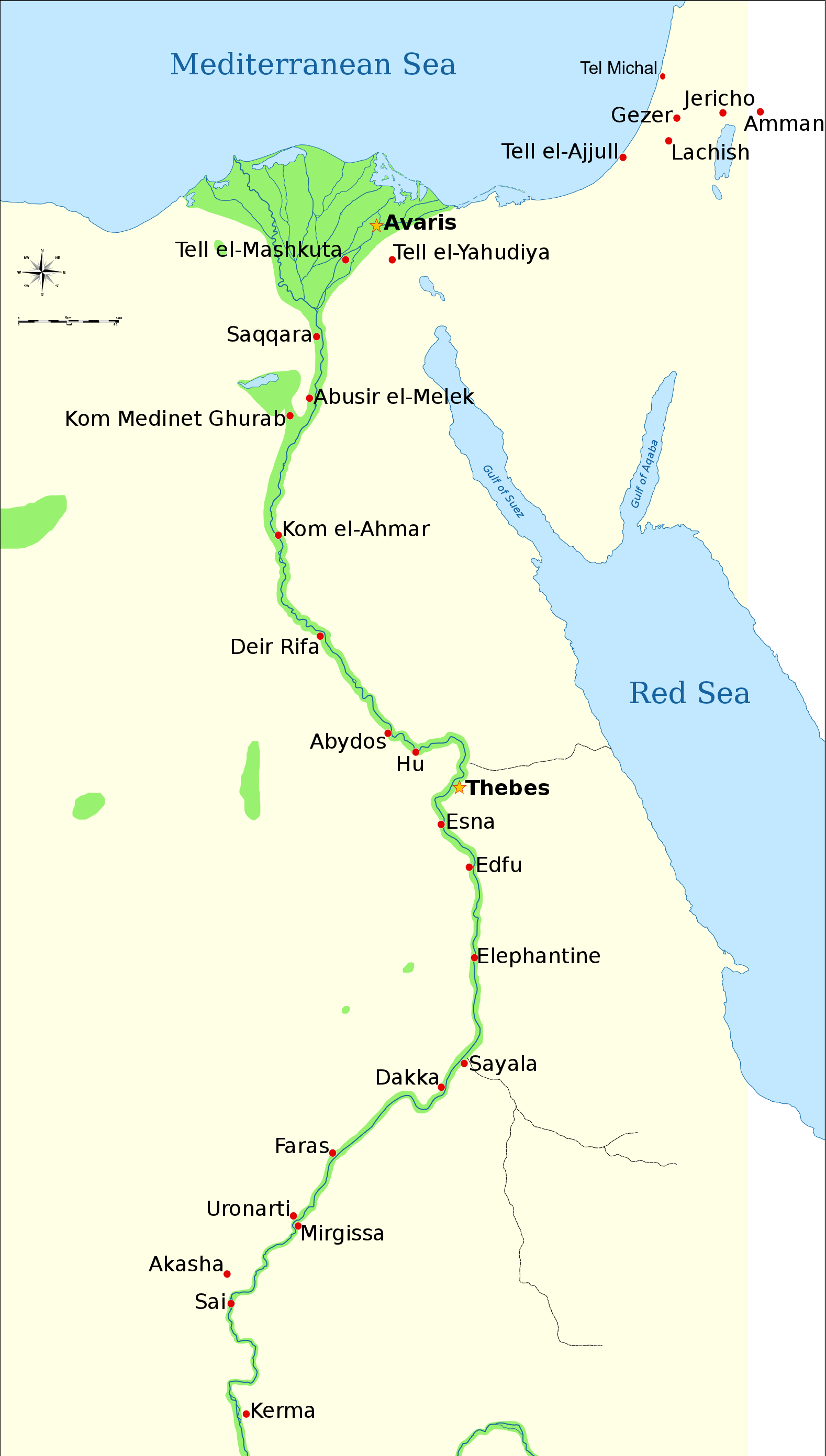
Provenance of some of the scarabs of Maaibre Sheshi

Consequently, Maaibre Sheshi is the best attested ruler of the Second Intermediate Period in terms of the number of artefacts attributed to him, with 396 seals and two seal impressions showing his nomen or prenomen. This figure is three times higher than the 123 seals attributed to the next best attested king of the period, Yakbim Sekhaenre. (Note: The dynasty and chronological position of Yakbim Sekhaenre are highly uncertain.)

In addition to these seals, Manfred Bietak has suggested that a scarab discovered in Avaris and inscribed with the name of a king "Shenshek" should probably be attributed to Sheshi. This conclusion is rejected by Kim Ryholt and Darrell Baker, who believe that Shenshek was a separate king.

=== Location of the finds ===
Over 80 percent of the seals attributed to Maaibre Sheshi are of unknown provenance, (Note: On the 396 seals of Sheshi catalogued by Ryholt, 325 are of unknown provenance—having possibly been dug up illegally.) but the remaining 20 percent have been found throughout Egypt, Nubia and Canaan, indicating widespread trade and diplomatic contacts during Sheshi's reign.

Important finds include seals from Lachish, Gezer, Jericho, Tel Michal, Amman and Tell el-Ajjul in Canaan. In Lower Egypt, three seals have been unearthed in Tell el-Yahudiya and Tell el-Mashkuta and a further eight are from the wider Delta region. Four seals originate from Saqqara and a further five from the Middle Egyptian sites of Abusir el-Melek, Kom Medinet Ghurab, Kom el-Ahmar and Deir Rifa. To the south, in Upper Egypt, a total of twenty seals are known from Abydos, Hu, Thebes, Elephantine, Esna and Edfu, In Nubia, seals of Sheshi have been found in the Egyptian fortresses of Uronarti and Mirgissa and otherwise in Dakka, Kerma, Sayala, Aniba, Masmas, Faras, Ukma, Akasha and Sai. Finally, two seal impressions of Sheshi have been found in Carthage, in a context dated archeologically to the 2nd-century BC.

The seals of Sheshi are now scattered in many different museums, including the Israel Museum, Petrie Museum, (Note: The Petrie Museum houses over 25 seals with catalog numbers UC 11682, 11683, 11684, 11685, 11986, 11687, 11688, 11689, 11690, 11692, 11693, 11694, 11695, 11696, 11697, 11698, 11699, 11700, 11701, 11702, 11703, 11704, 11705, 11706, 11825 and 16595.) Ashmolean, British Museum, Louvre, Walters Art Museum, Metropolitan Museum of Art and the Egyptian Museum of Cairo.

=== Historical sources ===
No historical attestation of Sheshi is known for certain. Sheshi is absent from the Turin canon, a list of kings written on papyrus during the Ramesside period and which serves as the primary historical source for the Second Intermediate Period. This is because the section of the papyrus covering the 13th to 17th Dynasties is heavily damaged and the problem of Sheshi's chronological position cannot be resolved from the document.

It is unclear whether Sheshi is mentioned in the Aegyptiaca, a history of Egypt written in the 3rd century BC during the reign of Ptolemy II (283–246 BC) by the Egyptian priest Manetho. Indeed, the Aegyptiaca only reports Hellenized names for Egyptian pharaohs and the identification of Sheshi with any particular name remains controversial.

Finally, Aharon Kempinski and Donald B. Redford have proposed that Sheshi is the historical figure who gave rise to the Biblical Sheshai, one of the Anakim living in Hebron at the time of the conquest of Canaan by the Hebrews according to Numbers 13:22. David Rohl goes even further and explicitly equates Sheshi with Sheshai.

== Dynasty ==
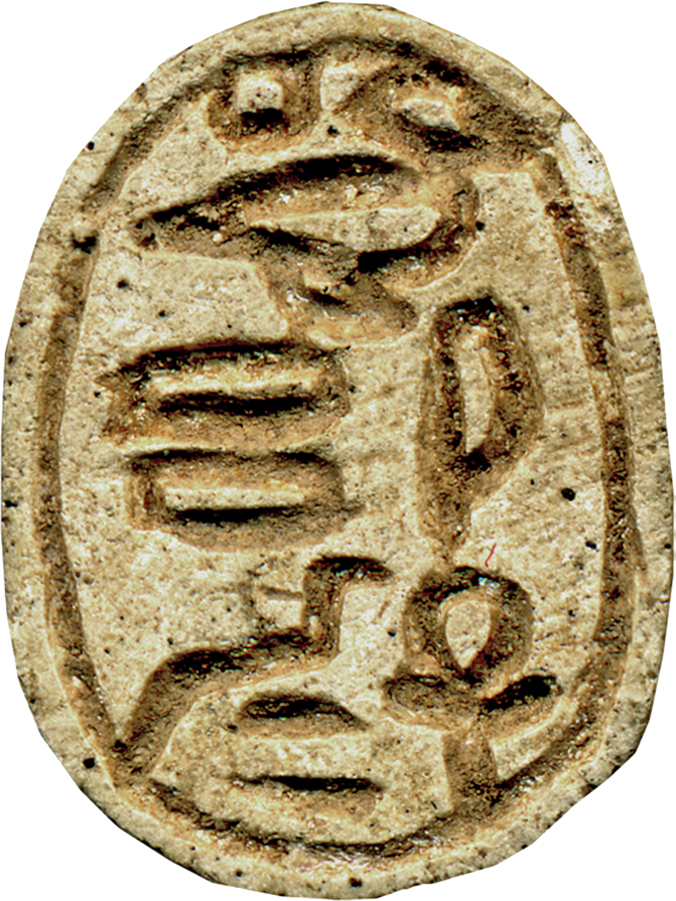
Seal reading "the Son of Ra, Sheshi, living for ever", Walters Art Museum

Three competing hypotheses have been proposed regarding the dynasty to which Sheshi belonged.

=== Hyksos ruler ===
William C. Hayes, Nicolas Grimal, Redford, and Peter Clayton identify Sheshi with Salitis (also known as Saites). According to the Aegyptiaca, Salitis was the founder of the Hyksos 15th Dynasty. Alternatively, Bietak and Janine Bourriau have proposed that Salitis should be identified with Sakir-Har, a poorly known ruler of the Second Intermediate Period who, in contrast to Sheshi, is known to have borne the title of "Hyksos".

If Sheshi is to be equated with Salitis, then the seals of Sheshi discovered in Nubia suggest that the Hyksos allied themselves with the Nubians against the native Egyptian 13th Dynasty as soon as they arrived in the Nile Delta, an event which Grimal places at c. 1720 BC. Grimal envisions Sheshi's kingdom as comprising the entire Nile Delta and the Nile valley north of Gebelein. According to Manetho as reported by Josephus in Against Apion, Salitis reigned from Memphis, and fortified the existing town of Avaris, which was to become the Hyksos' seat of power.

Grimal and Hayes further equate Sheshi with Sharek, a king whose sole attestation is found on a stone slab detailing the genealogy of Ankhefensekhmet, a priest who lived at the end of the 22nd Dynasty c. 750 BC, some 900 years after Sheshi's estimated lifetime. (Note: Sharek's existence is doubted by Ryholt.)

William Ayres Ward and the archaeologist Daphna Ben-Tor rely on seriations of the seals of Sheshi and other kings of the Second Intermediate Period to date Sheshi to the second half of the 15th Dynasty, between the great Hyksos pharaohs Khyan and Apophis.

=== Vassal of the Hyksos ===
Jürgen von Beckerath is less assertive about Sheshi's identity and assigns him to his combined 15th/16th Dynasty, where he regroups Hyksos rulers whose chronological position is uncertain together with kings whom he sees as vassals of the Hyksos. Von Beckerath's analysis relies on the hypothesis that Manetho's 16th Dynasty comprised minor rulers of the Nile Delta region, called lesser Hyksos, who served the great Hyksos kings of the 15th Dynasty such as Khyan and Apophis.

For Manfred Bietak, the large number of attestations of Sheshi suggests that he was an important Hyksos ruler, yet his inclusion in the 15th Dynasty may be doubtful given the total absence of monuments attributable to him. Thus, Bietak concludes that Sheshi should be placed in a group of West Semitic rulers who coexisted with the 15th Dynasty, possibly as vassals or partly independently from it, and some of whom even bore the title of "Hyksos".

The existence of lesser Hyksos kings in Egypt is currently debated. Ryholt has shown that a statement in Eusebius' epitome of the Aegyptiaca indicating that the Hyksos had vassals contains a corruption of Manetho's original text. Thus, he rejects the hypothesis that the 16th Dynasty comprised vassals of the Hyksos and maintains instead that it was a native Egyptian dynasty independently reigning over the Theban region between the fall of the 13th Dynasty and the advent of the 17th Dynasty. These conclusions on the 16th Dynasty have been accepted by many scholars, including Ben-Tor, James Peter Allen, Susan Allen, Baker and Redford. Yet, for both Redford and Bietak "without doubt, there were, under the umbrella of the fifteenth dynasty rulers, a series of vassals in southern and coastal Palestine, in Middle Egypt, and in Thebes. ... Such was the political system of the Hyksos, and typical of the Amorite kingdoms in Syria and the city-states in Palestine".

=== King of the 14th Dynasty ===
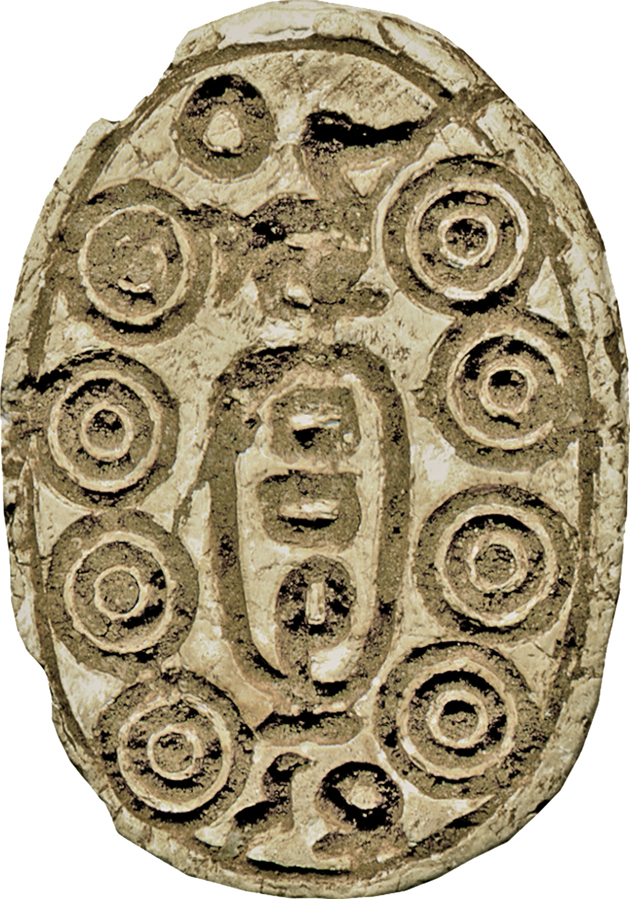
Seal reading "the son of Ra, Sheshi, living forever", Walters Art Museum.

Ryholt and Baker reject the identification of Sheshi as a 15th Dynasty ruler. Ryholt observes that early Hyksos kings, such as Sakir-Har and Khyan, are known to have adopted the title Heqa khasewet meaning "ruler of the foreign lands", (Note: This title is also often rendered as Heka-chasut, from the Egyptian Ḥq3-ḫ3swt.) a title which Sheshi did not bear. In addition, the later of these two kings, Khyan, only adopted an Egyptian prenomen during the second half of his reign—a practice that was followed by subsequent Hyksos kings. In contrast, if Sheshi is to be identified with Maaibre, then Sheshi bore a prenomen. This implies either that he was a Hyksos king reigning after Khyan, in contradiction with Khyan's known successors Apophis and Khamudi and the fact that Sheshi did not bear the title of Heqa khasewet; or that he belonged to another dynasty.

Consequently, Ryholt suggests that Sheshi was actually a 14th Dynasty ruler, the 14th Dynasty being a line of kings of Canaanite descent possibly ruling over the Eastern Nile Delta immediately before the arrival of the Hyksos 15th Dynasty. Many Egyptologists accept the existence of the 14th Dynasty based on archaeological evidence and on the fact that about 50 kings are recorded in the Turin canon between the 13th Dynasty and the later Hyksos rulers. On the other hand, Redford proposed that these 50 kings constitute the genealogy of the Hyksos rulers and that the 14th Dynasty is chimerical.

Based on a seriation of the scarab seals of the Second Intermediate Period available in 1900 AD, George Willoughby Fraser was able to date Sheshi's reign to "a short dynasty before the Hyksos invasion". More recently, Ryholt obtained a similar result using his own seriation and places Sheshi before Yaqub-Har and the great Hyksos rulers Khyan and Apophis and after Yakbim Sekhaenre, Ya'ammu Nubwoserre, Qareh Khawoserre and 'Ammu Ahotepre. Rolf Krauss independently reached the same conclusion. Given that the earliest 14th Dynasty ruler mentioned on the Turin canon is Nehesy, a king who left several attestations of his reign in the Delta region, and that there is only space for one predecessor for Nehesy on the canon, Ryholt concludes that the earlier document from which the canon was copied had a lacuna preceding Nehesy. Such lacunae are noted as wsf on the canon and could cover any number of kings. (Note: Ryholt's theory concerning the meaning of wsf on the Turin canon has been accepted by other scholars including Allen and Ben-Tor.) Thus, Ryholt sees no obstacle with having Sheshi succeed 'Ammu Ahotepre and immediately precede Nehesy.

== Dating ==
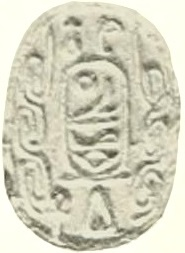
Scarab of Sheshi reading "The good god Maaibre, given life".

=== Mid-18th century BC ===
Ryholt dates Sheshi's reign to the mid-18th century BC. His main argument is the presence of seals of Sheshi and of two kings of the mid 13th Dynasty Sekhemrekhutawy Khabaw and Djedkheperew in the Egyptian fort of Uronarti in Nubia. The fort of Uronarti was abandoned at some point in the 13th Dynasty, an event which Ryholt dates to the reign of Djedkheperew given the lack of seals attributable to subsequent kings. Ryholt thus proposes that Sheshi reigned from c. 1745 BC until 1705 BC and was a contemporary of Khabaw and Djedkheperew.

Ryholt's hypothesis regarding Sheshi comes with his dating the start of the 14th Dynasty around 1805 BC, over 90 years earlier than accepted by most Egyptologists. (Note: The 14th dynasty is traditionally dated to 1710–1650 BC.) They propose instead that the 14th Dynasty emerged during the two decades of Merneferre Ay's reign, which is dated to between 1700 BC and 1660 BC, depending on the scholar. Ay is the last 13th Dynasty pharaoh to be attested in Lower Egypt, and most scholars, therefore, contend that he abandoned Itjtawy, the capital of Egypt since the reign of Amenemhat I (c. 1980 BC), in favor of Thebes, as he lost control of the Delta region to the 14th Dynasty. (Note: Most Egyptologists consider Nehesy to have been either the founder or the second king of this dynasty.)

=== Mid- to late-17th century BC ===
If Sheshi is to be identified with Salitis, the founder of the 15th Dynasty, according to Manetho, then he would have lived around 1650 BC, the date agreed upon by most Egyptologists, including Ryholt, for the arrival of the Hyksos in Egypt. If Sheshi lived during the second half of the 15th Dynasty between the reigns of Khyan and Apophis as Ben-Tor and Ward favor then Sheshi would have reigned c. 1600 BC.

=== Reign length ===
The Egyptologists identifying Sheshi with Salitis follow Josephus, Sextus Julius Africanus and Eusebius who report that Manetho credited Salitis with 19 years of reign in his Aegyptiaca. Ryholt relies instead on a statistical method and estimates the duration of Sheshi's reign to have been between 20 and 53 years. The method consists in tallying the seals of Yakbim Sekhaenre, Ya'ammu Nubwoserre, Qareh Khawoserre and 'Ammu Ahotepre with those of Sheshi. Then, knowing that the first four of these kings reigned for at least 30 years, (Note: This 30 year figure is strongly dependent on Ryholt's controversial reconstruction of the early 14th Dynasty. First, Ryholt uses a seriation of the seals of Yakbim, Ya'ammu, Qareh and 'Ammu to posit that they were Sheshi's predecessors, a conclusion rejected by S. and J. Allen and Ben-Tor. Then, Ryholt observes that the abandonment of the Egyptian fortress at Uronarti suggests that Sheshi and Djedkheperew were contemporaries, something which is also contested by Allen, Allen and Ben-Tor. Finally, Ryholt uses his reconstruction of the 13th Dynasty to date Djedkheperew's reign to c. 1770, leaving around 30 years for Sheshi's four predecessors.) implies that they have left between 7.5 and 20 seals per year while on throne. Consequently, Sheshi's nearly 400 scarabs would correspond to 20 to 53 years, which Ryholt gives as about 40 years.

== Family ==
Ryholt proposes that Sheshi had at least two consorts; Tati with whom he fathered his successor pharaoh Nehesy, and an unknown queen with whom he fathered a prince Ipqu. Ryholt reached this conclusion on noting that scarabs of queen Tati and Princes Ipqu and Nehesy bear stylistic markers which are found on those of Sheshi and thus that they must have been contemporaries. In addition, "Tati" is attested as a feminine Nubian name in earlier execration texts, which would explain the peculiar name of Nehesy meaning "the Nubian". For Ryholt, Sheshi's motivation behind a dynastic marriage with a Kushite princess was to ally his kingdom with the Nubians. Ryholt's hypothesis concerning Nehesy may be vindicated by a number of scarabs giving Nehesy the titles of "king's son" and of "eldest king son", indicating that Nehesy's father was a king as well. In addition, both Nehesy and Ipqu bore the titles of "king's son of Ra", a conflation of the titles "son of Ra" and "king's son", which could indicate that they were appointed junior coregents by Sheshi.

These conclusions are shared by Baker but rejected by Ben-Tor, who argues not only that Nehesy reigned before Sheshi but also that the Nehesy referred to as "king's son" was a later Hyksos prince. In 2005 a stele of Nehesy was discovered in the fortress city of Tjaru, the starting point of the Way of Horus, the major road leading out of Egypt into Canaan. The stele shows a "king's son Nehesy" offering oil to the god Banebdjedet and also bears an inscription mentioning the "king's sister Tany". A woman with this name and title is known from other sources around the time of the Hyksos pharaoh Apophis c. 1570 BC. This suggests that the "king's son Nehesy" of the stela lived c. 1570 BC as well, over 100 years after King Nehesy's estimated lifetime. This could be confirmed by Ben-Tor's observation that the scarabs referring to the "king's son Nehesy" are different in style from those referring to king Nehesy. In this situation, the "king's son Nehesy" would be a Hyksos prince different from the better-known king Nehesy.

== Notes, references and sources ==
=== Sources ===
- 'Abd El-Maksoud, Mohamed; Valbelle, Dominique (2005). "Tell Héboua-Tjarou. L'apport de l'épigraphie". Revue d'Égyptologie (in French). Vol. 56. pp. 1–44.
- Baker, Darrell D. (2008). The Encyclopedia of the Egyptian Pharaohs. Volume I: Predynastic to the Twentieth Dynasty (3300–1069 BC). London: Bannerstone Press. ISBN 978-1-905299-37-9.
- Ben-Tor, Daphna; Allen, Susan; Allen, James Peter (1999). "Seals and Kings". Bulletin of the American Schools of Oriental Research. Vol. 315. pp. 47–74.
- Ben-Tor, Daphna (2007). Scarabs, Chronology, and Interconnections: Egypt and Palestine in the Second Intermediate Period. Orbis biblicus et orientalis, Series Archaeologica 27. Fribourg: Academic Press. ISBN 978-3-7278-1593-5.
- Ben-Tor, Daphna (2010). "Sequence and chronology of Second Intermediate Period royal-name scarabs, based on excavated series from Egypt and the Levant". In Marée, Marcel (ed.). The Second Intermediate Period (Thirteenth-Seventeenth Dynasties). Current Research, Future Prospects. Orientalia Lovaniensia Analecta 192. Leuven; Walpole, MA: Peeters. ISBN 978-90-429-2228-0.
- Bietak, Manfred (1991). "Egypt and Canaan during the Middle Bronze Age". Bulletin of the American Schools of Oriental Research. Vol. 281. JSTOR 1357163.
- Bietak, Manfred (1997). "The Center of Hyksos Rule: Avaris (Tell el-Dab'a)". In Oren, Eliezer D. (ed.). The Hyksos: New Historical and Archaeological Perspectives. University Museum monograph 96; University Museum symposium series, vol. 8. Philadelphia: University Museum. pp. 87–139. ISBN 978-0-924171-46-8.
- Bietak, Manfred (1999). "Hyksos". In Bard, Kathryn (ed.). Encyclopedia of the Archaeology of Ancient Egypt (3rd ed.). Routledge. ISBN 978-0-415-18589-9.
- Bietak, Manfred (2001). "Hyksos". In Redford, Donald B. (ed.). The Oxford Encyclopedia of Ancient Egypt, Volume 2. Oxford University Press. pp. 136–143. ISBN 978-0-19-510234-5.
- Bourriau, Janine (2003). "The Second Intermediate Period (c. 1650–1550 BC)". In Shaw, Ian (ed.). The Oxford History of Ancient Egypt (new ed.). Oxford: Oxford University Press. ISBN 978-0-19-280458-7.
- Clayton, Peter (1994). Chronicle of the Pharaohs. Thames & Hudson. ISBN 978-0-500-05074-3.
- Grimal, Nicolas (1992). A History of Ancient Egypt. Translated by Ian Shaw. Oxford: Blackwell publishing. ISBN 978-0-631-19396-8.
- Hayes, William (1978). The Scepter of Egypt: A Background for the Study of the Egyptian Antiquities in The Metropolitan Museum of Art. Vol. 2, The Hyksos Period and the New Kingdom (1675–1080 B.C.). The Metropolitan Museum of Art. ISBN 978-0-87099-191-2.
- Hall, Harry Reginald (1913). Catalogue of Egyptian scarabs, etc., in the British Museum. London: British Museum, Department of Egyptian and Assyrian Antiquities. OCLC 494841105.
- Hannig, Rainer (2006). Grosses Handwörterbuch Ägyptisch-Deutsch (2800–950 v. Chr.): die Sprache der Pharaonen. Kulturgeschichte der antiken Welt, Bd. 64 (in German). Mainz: Philip von Zabern. ISBN 978-3-8053-1771-9.
- Hornung, Erik; Krauss, Rolf; Warburton, David, eds. (2012). Ancient Egyptian Chronology. Handbook of Oriental Studies. Leiden, Boston: Brill. ISBN 978-90-04-11385-5. ISSN 0169-9423.
- Kempinski, Aharon (1983). Syrien und Palästina (Kanaan) in der letzten Phase der Mittelbronze IIB – Zeit (1650–1570 v. Chr.). Ägypten und Altes Testament, Bd. 4 (in German). Wiesbaden: Harrassowitz. ISBN 978-3-447-02295-8.
- Krauss, Rolf (1998). "An Examination of Khyan's Place in W. A. Ward's Seriation of Royal Hyksos Scarabs". Ägypten und Levante. Vol. 7. pp. 39–42.
- Leprohon, Ronald J. (2013). The Great Name: Ancient Egyptian Royal Titulary. Writings from the ancient world, no. 33. Atlanta: Society of Biblical Literature. ISBN 978-1-58983-736-2.
- "Maaibre Sheshi". Digital Egypt for Universities. University College London.
- Quirke, Stephen (2001). "Second Intermediate Period". In Redford, Donald B. (ed.). The Oxford Encyclopedia of Ancient Egypt, Volume 3. Oxford University Press. pp. 260–265. ISBN 978-0-19-510234-5.
- Redford, Donald (1992). Egypt, Canaan, and Israel in Ancient Times. Princeton: Princeton University Press. ISBN 978-0-691-03606-9.
- Redford, Donald B. (1997). "Textual Sources for the Hyksos Period". In Oren, Eliezer D. (ed.). The Hyksos: New Historical and Archaeological Perspectives. University Museum monograph 96, University Museum symposium series vol. 8. Philadelphia: University Museum, University of Pennsylvania. pp. 1–44. ISBN 978-0-924171-46-8.
- Redissi, Taoufik (1999). "Étude des empreintes de sceaux de Carthage". In Rakob, Friedrich (ed.). Karthago, III. Die deutschen Ausgrabungen in Karthago. Mainz: Philipp von Zabern. pp. 4–92. ISBN 978-3-8053-1679-8.
- Rice, Michael (1999). Who's Who in Ancient Egypt. Routledge London & New York. ISBN 978-0-203-44328-6.
- Rohl, David (2007). The Lords of Avaris: Uncovering the Legendary Origins of Western Civilization. London: Century. ISBN 978-0-7126-7762-2.
- Ryholt, Kim (1997). The Political Situation in Egypt during the Second Intermediate Period, c. 1800–1550 B.C. CNI publications, 20. Carsten Niebuhr Institute of Near Eastern Studies, University of Copenhagen : Museum Tusculanum Press. ISBN 978-87-7289-421-8.
- Ryholt, Kim (2010). "The date of kings Sheshi and Yaqubhar and the rise of the fourteenth dynasty". In Marée, Marcel (ed.). The Second Intermediate Period (Thirteenth-Seventeenth Dynasties). Current Research, Future Prospects. Orientalia Lovaniensia Analecta 192. Leuven; Walpole, MA: Peeters. ISBN 978-90-429-2228-0.
- "Salitis". Encyclopædia Britannica Online. 2015.
- "Scarab of Sheshi". The Israel Museum. Archived from the original on 2015-11-18.
- "Sheshi, MMA online catalog". Metropolitan Museum of Art.
- "Sheshi, Petrie Museum online catalog". Petrie Museum.
- von Beckerath, Jürgen (1999). Handbuch der ägyptischen Königsnamen (in German). Münchner ägyptologische Studien, Heft 49, Mainz : Philip von Zabern. ISBN 978-3-8053-2591-2.
- Waddell, William Gillan (1971). Manetho. Loeb classical library, 350. Cambridge, Massachusetts; London: Harvard University Press; W. Heinemann. OCLC 6246102.
- "Walters Art Museum, Online Collection". Walters Art Museum.
- Ward, William A. (1984). "Royal-Name Scarabs". In Tufnell, Olga (ed.). Scarab Seals and their Contribution to History in the Early Second Millennium B.C. Studies on Scarab Seals 2. Warminster: Aris & Phillips. pp. 151–192.
- Willoughby Fraser, George (1900). A Catalogue of the Scarabs belonging to George Fraser. London: B. Quaritch. OCLC 1119018.
