= Yakareb =

Egyptian pharaoh

- Yak'reb, Yekeb-Baal, Yakba'al(?), Yekeb-Bor, Ykb-l
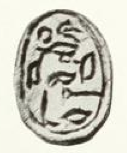
- Scarab of Yakareb photographed by Flinders Petrie and now in the Petrie Museum

Pharaoh
- Reign: unknown duration
- Predecessor: unknown
- Successor: unknown
Royal titulary
Nomen
Yakareb
Ya-k-ˁ-r-b
G39 N5 i i k a r b
- Dynasty: uncertain, possibly 14th dynasty

Yakareb may have been a ruler of some part of Egypt during the Second Intermediate Period, possibly during the 17th century BC, and likely belonging to the Fourteenth Dynasty. As such he would have ruled from Avaris over the eastern Nile Delta and possibly over the Western Delta as well. His chronological position and identity are unclear.

== Attestations ==
Yakareb is one of the few attested kings of the 14th Dynasty with two scarab seals attributable to him, both of unknown provenance. One of the two scarabs is currently housed in the Egyptian Museum of Berlin, catalog number 293/73, while the other is in the Petrie Museum, under the catalog number 11810.

Since "Yakareb" is this king's nomen, it is not possible to assert whether or not Yakareb is listed on the Turin canon. The Turin canon is a king list redacted in the early Ramesside period, which serves as the primary historical source for the 14th Dynasty but which records only the prenomen of the kings. Moreover, the document is fragmentary and Yakareb's prenomen may be lost in a lacuna. Thus, Yakareb is attested for certain by only the two scarabs, both of which are crudely made, and it is possible that "Yakareb" is a garbled or variant form of the name of a better known king of this time period.

== Chronological position ==
Although the chronological position of Yakareb is uncertain, the Egyptologists Kim Ryholt and Darrell Baker proposed that he ruled in the 14th Dynasty some time before Yaqub-Har. This estimation is based on a seriation of the scarabs dating to the Second Intermediate Period.
