= Qareh Khawoserre =

Egyptian pharaoh

- Qar, Qur, Qal
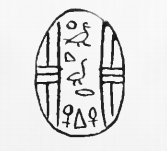
- Scarab seal with the nomen Qareh

Pharaoh
- Reign: c. 10 years, 1770 BC - 1760 BC
- Predecessor: uncertain, Ya'ammu Nubwoserre
- Successor: uncertain, 'Ammu Ahotepre
Royal titulary
Prenomen
Khawoserre
ḫˁ-wsr-Rˁ
Ra is mighty of apparition
R8 F35 ra N28 D36 F12 s
Nomen
Qareh
Q3-r-ḥ
The bald one
G39 N5 N29 G1 r V28
- Dynasty: 14th dynasty

Qareh Khawoserre was possibly the third king of the Canaanite 14th Dynasty of Egypt, who reigned over the eastern Nile Delta from Avaris during the Second Intermediate Period. His reign is believed to have lasted about 10 years, from 1770 BC until 1760 BC or later, around 1710 BC. Alternatively, Qareh could have been a later vassal of the Hyksos kings of the 15th Dynasty and would then be classified as a king of the 16th Dynasty.

Qareh's name is West Semitic and means "The bald one". Qareh's name was earlier misread as Qar, Qur, and Qal.

== Attestations ==
Qareh Khawoserre is attested by thirty royal seals inscribed with his name, only one of which has a known provenance: Jericho in Palestine. His nomen Qareh is attested by 8 seals and his prenomen Khawoserre is attested by 22 seals.

Qareh's name is inscribed in Egyptian hieroglyphs (k-3-r-h); however, it is not Egyptian, but rather West Semitic. Krh is a common West Semitic name meaning "the bald one".

== Identification ==
The Egyptologist Kim Ryholt equates Qareh with the prenomen Khawoserre, which is also only attested through scarab seals. Qareh's chronological position is uncertain, with Ryholt and Darrell Baker placing him as the third king of the 14th Dynasty based on the style of his seals. On the other hand, Thomas Schneider and Jürgen von Beckerath see him as a ruler of the 16th Dynasty. Alternatively, James Peter Allen proposes that he was an Hyksos ruler of the early 15th Dynasty

== See also ==
- Hyksos

Preceded by Ya'ammu Nubwoserre	Pharaoh of Egypt; Fourteenth Dynasty	Succeeded by 'Ammu Ahotepre
