= Ya'ammu Nubwoserre =

Egyptian pharaoh

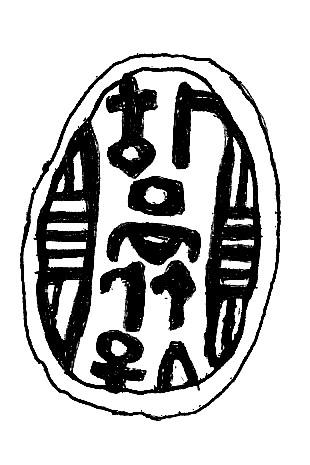
- Drawing of a scarab seal of Nubwoserre. Petrie Museum (UC16597)

Pharaoh
- Reign: c.10 years, 1780-1770 BCE (Ryholt)
- Predecessor: uncertain, Yakbim Sekhaenre
- Successor: uncertain, Qareh Khawoserre
Royal titulary
Prenomen
Nubwoserre
Nbw-wsr-R՚
Ra is the golden ruler
R8 nfr < N5 S12 wsr s >

| M23 X1 L2 X1 | N5 S12 wsr s |
Nomen
Ya'ammu
i i O29 D36 n n n
- Dynasty: likely 14th Dynasty

Nubwoserre Ya'ammu (also rendered as Ya'amu, Jamu and Jaam) was a ruler during the Second Intermediate Period of Egypt. This Asiatic-blooded ruler is traditionally placed in the Sixteenth Dynasty, an hypothesis still in use nowadays by scholars such as Jürgen von Beckerath; although recently Kim Ryholt proposed him as the second ruler of the 14th Dynasty.

== Identification ==
This ruler seems to have made little use of the cartouche – which was a pharaonic prerogative – since it was used only for the throne name, Nubwoserre, though not always. His personal name never appears inside a cartouche, and is simply reported as "the son of Ra, Ya'ammu".

Similar to his suggested predecessor Yakbim Sekhaenre, there is no direct evidence that Ya'ammu's throne name was Nubwoserre: the association is based on stylistic features of the seals and was proposed by William Ayres Ward and later elaborated by Ryholt; Daphna Ben-Tor disputed this identification, pointing out that the seals of the many rulers living during this period are too similar to make such correlations on the basis of mere design features. The Turin King List can not help with this issue since the ruler does not appear on it, likely due to a lacuna.

Assuming that Ward and Ryholt were right, Nubwoserre Ya'ammu is attested by 26 rather crude scarab seals (more precisely, 19 naming Nubwoserre and 7 naming Ya'ammu); based on that, Ryholt estimated for him a reign length of around ten years, in the interval 1780–1770 BCE. However, about the events of his reign absolutely nothing is known.

Israeli Egyptologist Raphael Giveon identifies Ya'ammu with his proposed predecessor Yakbim.
