= Fourteenth Dynasty of Egypt =

Ancient Egyptian dynasty during the Second Intermediate Period

14th Dynasty of Egypt
- c. 1725 BC–c. 1650 BC
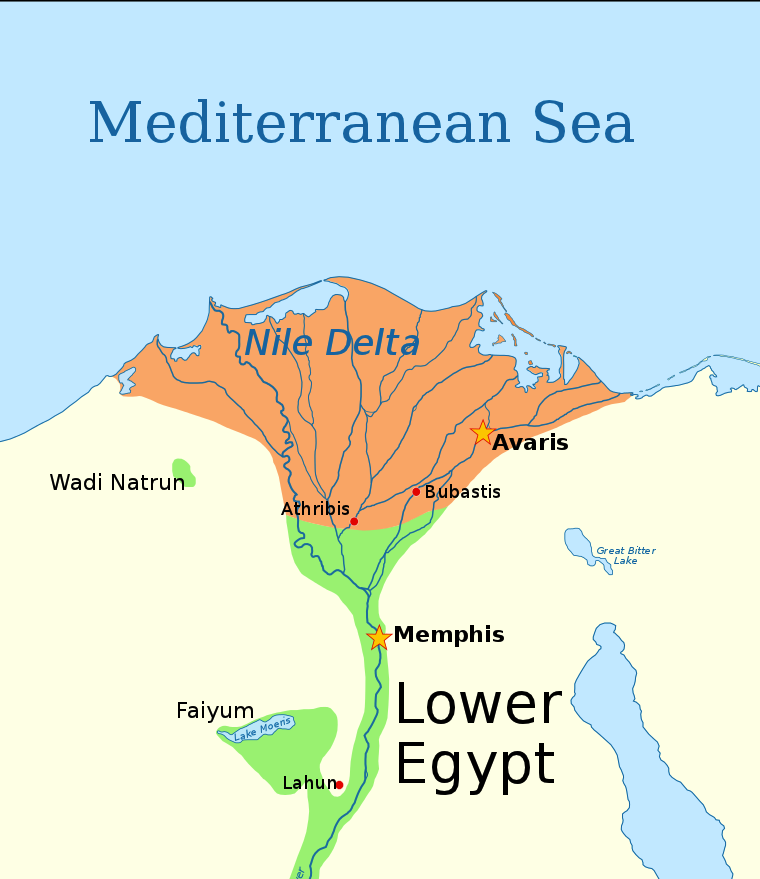
- Orange shading indicates the territory possibly under control of the 14th Dynasty, according to Kim Ryholt
- Capital: Xois or Avaris
- Common languages: Egyptian
- Religion: Ancient Egyptian religion
- Government: Absolute monarchy
- Monarch
- Historical era: Second Intermediate Period of Egypt
  - Established: c. 1725 BC
  - Disestablished: c. 1650 BC
Preceded by
12th Dynasty of Egypt
13th Dynasty of Egypt
Succeeded by
15th Dynasty of Egypt
16th Dynasty of Egypt
Abydos Dynasty

The Fourteenth Dynasty of Egypt was a series of rulers reigning during the Second Intermediate Period over the Nile Delta region of Egypt. It lasted between 75 (c. 1725–1650 BC) and 155 years (c. 1805–1650 BC), depending on the scholar. The capital of the dynasty was Xois in the central Delta according to the Egyptian historian Manetho. Kim Ryholt and some historians think that the dynasty's capital was probably Avaris. The 14th Dynasty was another Egyptian dynasty that existed concurrently with the 13th Dynasty based in Thebes. The Egyptian rulers of the 14th dynasty are recorded and attested in the ancient Egyptian Turin List of Kings. On the other hand, another proposed list of contested vassals or rulers during the 14th Dynasty (proposed by Kim Ryholt) are identified as being of Canaanite (Semitic) descent, owing to the foreign origins of the names of some of their rulers and princes, like Ipqu (West Semitic for "grace"), Yakbim ("ia-ak-bi-im", an Amorite name), Qareh (West Semitic for "the bald one"), or Yaqub-Har. Names in relation with Nubia are also recorded in two cases, king Nehesy ("The Nubian") and queen Tati. This probably remarks the beginning of Hyksos control and domination over eastern Delta.

== Chronology ==
The 14th Dynasty is commonly grouped together with the 13th, 15th, 16th, and 17th as the Second Intermediate Period. Less commonly, the 14th Dynasty is combined with the 11th, 12th, and 13th Dynasties in the Middle Kingdom of Egypt period, though the 14th Dynasty overlaps at least partially with either of (or both of) the 13th Dynasty and the 15th Dynasty.

There are enough gaps in the knowledge of the 14th Dynasty that its absolute chronological position is debated, and can vary by as much as 75 years between authorities. Egyptologist Kim Ryholt proposes that the 14th Dynasty emerged during the late 12th Dynasty, around 1805 BC, during or shortly after Sobekneferu's rule. He contends that the Canaanite immigrants who have infiltrated into East Delta declared their independence and staved off possible attempts from the 13th Dynasty Memphite kings to recover the Delta. According to Ryholt, the 14th Dynasty lasted from around 1805 BC until its demise under the Hyksos 15th Dynasty around 1650 BC, lasting a total of around 155 years.

This hypothesis is not shared by some Egyptologists, such as Manfred Bietak, Daphna Ben Tor, and James and Susan Allen, who argue that the 14th Dynasty could not have emerged before the mid 13th Dynasty, around 1720 BC, after the reign of Sobekhotep IV. In particular, they argue that the evidence from the strata levels where 14th Dynasty seals have been discovered conclusively establishes that the 14th Dynasty was only contemporary with the 13th Dynasty in the last half century of the latter's existence, i.e., after around 1700 BC. Additionally, Manfred Bietak has dated the inscriptions and monuments of Nehesy, possibly the second ruler of the 14th Dynasty, to around 1700 BC as well.

Following the very short reign of Nehesy, most scholars – including Manfred Bietak and Kim Ryholt – agree that the Delta region was struck by a prolonged famine and perhaps a plague lasting until the end of the 14th Dynasty. The same famine may have affected the 13th Dynasty, which also exhibits instability and numerous ephemeral kings in its last 50 years of existence, from around 1700 BC until 1650 BC. The weakened state of both kingdoms may explain, in part, why they fell rapidly to the emerging Hyksos power around 1650 BC.

== Seat of power ==
The Manethonian tradition credits the 14th Dynasty with as many as 76 kings ruling from Xois rather than Avaris. However, Egyptologist Kim Ryholt notes that the Turin Canon mentions only approximately 56 kings, and does not have enough space to have recorded more than 70. Ryholt also points to excavations at Avaris that revealed the existence of a large royal palace dating to the Second Intermediate Period. One of its courtyards housed a statue of a king or high-ranking official, over twice life-size, and possessing non-Egyptian attributes. For these reasons, Ryholt and most Egyptologists share the view that Avaris – rather than Xois – was the 14th Dynasty's seat of power.

== Extent of rule and foreign relations ==
The precise borders of the 14th Dynasty state are not known, due to the general scarcity of its monuments. In his study of the Second Intermediate Period, Kim Ryholt concludes that the territory directly controlled by the 14th Dynasty roughly consisted of the Nile Delta, with borders located near Athribis in the western Delta and Bubastis in the east.

Seals attributable to the 14th Dynasty have been found in Middle and Upper Egypt – then entirely the territory of the 13th Dynasty – and as far south as Dongola, beyond the Nile River's Third Cataract. To the north, seals have been found in the southern Levant, principally along the Mediterranean coast, even as far north as Tel Kabri (in modern-day northern Israel, near the border with Lebanon). This indicates the existence of important trade conducted between the 13th Dynasty, the Canaanite city-states, and Nubia. Ryholt further proposes that king Sheshi, whom he sees as a 14th Dynasty ruler, married a Nubian princess, queen Tati, to strengthen relations with the Kushite kingdom.

== Rulers ==
The following rulers are not controversial, being established by the Turin Canon – and, for a few of them, by contemporary sources as well:

14th Dynasty Monarchs of Egypt
Portrait	Name	Reign	Lifespan	Comments
	Unknown			
	Nehesy	c. 1705 BC	Died c. 1705 BC	Best attested king of the dynasty, he left his name on two monuments at Avaris. His name means "The Nubian".
	Khakherewre	c. 1705 BC	Died c. 1705 BC	
	Nebefawre	c. 1705 – c. 1704 BC	Died c. 1704 BC	Turin canon: reigned 1 year, 5 months, 15 days
	Sehebre	c. 1704 – c. 1700 BC	Died c. 1700 BC	Turin canon: reigned 3 years [lost] months, 1 day
	Merdjefare	c. 1700 – c. 1699 BC	Died c. 1699 BC	Attested by a single stela from Saft el-Hinna, in the Delta
	Sewadjkare III	c. 1699 – c. 1698 BC	Died c. 1698 BC	Turin canon: reigned 1 year
	Nebdjefare	c. 1698 – c. 1694 BC	Died c. 1694 BC	
	Webenre	c. 1694 – c. 1693 BC	Died c. 1693 BC	
	Unknown	c. 1693 – c. 1692 BC	Died c. 1692 BC	Lost in the Turin king list
	[...]djefare	c. 1692 – c. 1691 BC	Died c. 1691 BC	
	[...]webenre	c. 1691 – c. 1690 BC	Died c. 1690 BC	
	Awibre II	c. 1690 – c. 1689 BC	Died c. 1689 BC	
	Heribre	c. 1689 – c. 1688 BC	Died c. 1688 BC	
	Nebsenre	c. 1688 – c. 1687 BC	Died c. 1687 BC	Attested by a jar bearing his prenomen. Reigned for at least 5 months.
	Unknown	c. 1687 c. 1686 BC	Died c. 1686 BC	wsf in the Turin king list, indicating a lacuna in the document from which the list was copied
	[...]re	c. 1686 – c. 1685 BC	Died c. 1685 BC	
	Sekheperenre	c. 1685 – c. 1684 BC	Died c. 1684 BC	One of the only undisputed 14th Dynasty kings known from contemporary sources (along with Nehesy, Nebsenre, and Merdjefare)
	Djedkherewre	c. 1684 – c. 1683 BC	Died c. 1683 BC	
	Sankhibre	c. 1683 – c. 1682 BC	Died c. 1682 BC	
	Nefertum[...]re	c. 1682 c. 1681 BC	Died c. 1681 BC	
	Sekhem[...]re	c. 1681 – c. 1680 BC	Died c. 1680 BC	
	Kakaukemure	c. 1680 – c. 1679 BC	Died c. 1679 BC	
	Neferib[…]re	c. 1679 – c. 1678 BC	Died c. 1678 BC	
	I[...]re	c. 1678 – c. 1677 BC	Died c. 1677 BC	
	Khakare	c. 1677 – c. 1676 BC	Died c. 1676 BC	
	Aakare	c. 1676 – c. 1675 BC	Died c. 1675 BC	
	Semenenre	c. 1675 – c. 1674 BC	Died c. 1674 BC	
	Djedkare	c. 1674 – c. 1673 BC	Died c. 1673 BC	
	Babnum [...]kare	c. 1673 - c. 1672 BC	Died c. 1672 BC	
	Unknown	c. 1672 — c. 1671 BC	Died c. 1671 BC	
	Unknown	c. 1671 – c. 1670 BC	Died c. 1670 BC	
	Unknown	c. 1670 – c. 1669 BC	Died c. 1669 BC	
	Unknown	c. 1669 – c. 1668 BC	Died c. 1668 BC	
	Unknown	c. 1668 – c. 1667 BC	Died c. 1667 BC	
	Unknown	c. 1667 – c. 1666 BC	Died c. 1666 BC	
	Unknown	c. 1666 – c. 1665 BC	Died c. 1665 BC	
	Unknown	c. 1665 – c. 1664 BC	Died c. 1664 BC	
	Senefer[…]re	c. 1664 – c. 1663 BC	Died c. 1663 BC	
	Men[...]re	c. 1663 – c. 1662 BC	Died c. 1662 BC	
	[…]Djed[…]	c. 1662 – c. 1661 BC	Died c. 1661 BC	
	Unknown	c. 1661 – c. 1660 BC	Died c. 1660 BC	
	Unknown	c. 1660 – c. 1659 BC	Died c. 1659 BC	
	Unknown	c. 1659 – c. 1658 BC	Died c. 1658 BC	
	Inenek[…]	c. 1658 – c. 1657 BC	Died c. 1657 BC	
	Ineb[…]	c. 1657 – c. 1656 BC	Died c. 1656 BC	
	'Ip[…]	c. 1656 – c. 1655 BC	Died c. 1655 BC	Possibly Apophis I, see possible list below
	Unknown	c. 1655 – c. 1654 BC	Died c. 1654 BC	
	Unknown	c. 1654 – c. 1653 BC	Died c. 1653 BC	
	Unknown	c. 1653 – c. 1652 BC	Died c. 1652 BC	
	Unknown	c. 1652 – c. 1651 BC	Died c. 1651 BC	
	Unknown	c. 1651 – c. 1650 BC	Died c. 1650 BC	

The order of rulers for this dynasty is established by the Turin Royal Canon and is widely accepted – except for the first five rulers, which are given below after Ryholt. The names of these rulers are not given on the Turin Canon (except for perhaps one), and Ryholt proposes that they were mentioned as wsf in the list, which denotes a lacuna in the original document from which the list was copied during the Ramesside period. Rather, Ryholt identifies the first five kings thanks to a seriation of their seals. His conclusions are debated, however, in Ben Tor's study of the strata levels, in which seals attributed to the first five kings have been found. Ben Tor concludes that the reigns of Sheshi, Ammu, and Yakbim date to the second half of the Hyksos 15th Dynasty, and are not contemporary with the 13th Dynasty. According to Ben Tor, these kings were most likely minor vassal rulers of the Hyksos kings that ruled over the Nile Delta. Several rulers attested by contemporary artefacts who are otherwise unknown from the Turin Canon could be dated to the 14th or 15th Dynasty. Their identities and chronological position remain unclear.

14th Dynasty Monarchs of Egypt, undetermined position
Portrait	Name	Comments
	Yakbim	Might be a vassal of the 15th Dynasty
	Ya'ammu	
	Shenshek	1 scarab-seal
	Wazad	5 scarab-seals
	Qareh	
	Khamure	2 scarab-seals
	Ammu	
	Yakareb	2 scarab-seals
	Sheshi	
	Yaqub-Har	27 scarab-seals
	Nuya	1 scarab-seal
	Sheneh	3 scarab-seals
	Apophis I	Turin Cannon preserves only 'Ap[...] (see uncontested list above). Ryholt and Baker consider proper reconstruction to be 'Apepi, who they thus consider to be the 51st ruler of the 14th Dynasty, c. 1650 BC; von Beckerath sees 'Apepi as a member of the late 16th Dynasty and a vassal of the Hyksos rulers of the 15th Dynasty.

== Bibliography ==
- K.S.B. Ryholt (1998). The Political Situation in Egypt During the Second Intermediate Period, C1800–1550 BC. Museum Tusculanum Press. ISBN 8772894210.
- K.A. Kitchen (1993). Ramesside Inscriptions. Blackwell Publishing. ISBN 0631184279.

Preceded by 13th Dynasty	Dynasty of Egypt c. 1725 BC − c. 1650 BC	Succeeded by 15th Dynasty
