= Yakbim Sekhaenre =

Egyptian pharaoh

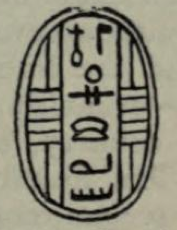
- Scarab seal of Sekhaenre, now likely in the Petrie Museum

Pharaoh
- Reign: c. 25 years, 1805-1780 BCE (Ryholt)
- Predecessor: none (founder)
- Successor: Ya'ammu Nubwoserre
Royal titulary
Prenomen
Sekhaenre
He who appears through Ra
N5 O34 N28 D36 n
Nomen
Yakbim
i i V31 D58 n n n
- Dynasty: likely 14th Dynasty

Sekhaenre Yakbim or Yakbmu was a ruler during the Second Intermediate Period of Egypt. Although his dynastic and temporal collocation is disputed, Danish Egyptologist Kim Ryholt believes that he likely was the founder of the Levantine-blooded Fourteenth Dynasty, while in older literature he was mainly considered a member of the Sixteenth Dynasty.

== Identification ==
His name never appears inside a cartouche, which was a pharaonic prerogative; nevertheless, on his seals he is usually called "the good god, Sekhaenre" (or simply "Sekhaenre") and "the son of Ra, Yakbim".

No evidence confirms that the prenomen Sekhaenre and nomen Yakbim belong together. This theory is based on stylistic features of the seals and was proposed by William Ayres Ward and later elaborated on by Ryholt; Daphna Ben-Tor disputed this identification, pointing out that the seals of the several rulers living during this period are too similar to make such correlations on the basis of mere design features. Thus, they should be studied as two independent rulers.

Assuming that Ward was right, Sekhaenre Yakbim is attested by a remarkable 123 seals, second only—for this period—to the 396 of Sheshi. Based on that, Ryholt estimated for him a reign length of around 25 years, in the interval 1805–1780 BCE.

Israeli Egyptologist Raphael Giveon identified Yakbim with another ruler of the same period, Ya'ammu Nubwoserre, while Jürgen von Beckerath equated Yakbim with Salitis, the Manethonian founder of the Fifteenth Dynasty.

== Attestations ==
=== Sekhaenre (prenomen) ===
See Ryholt 1997:359 File 13/d

A scarab bearing the prenomen of this king was discovered in Tell el-Ajjul, Gaza Strip by Flinders Petrie in 1933.

- EA30511 | At Saqqara(?), a scarab.

At Deir el-Bahri are three limestone blocks BM EA 41130, Cairo, Cairo JE 46197.

==== Seals ====
Levant. At Tell el-Fara, scarab-seal with Prenomen. At Tell el-Ajjul, three scarab seals with Prenomen.

Egypt. In the Delta, two scarab seals with Prenomen. At Tell el-Yahudieh, a scarab seal with Prenomen. At Saqqara (?), a scarab-seal with Prenomen. At Abydos, a scarab-seal with Prenomen.

Nubia. At Aniba (Nubia), a scarab seal with Prenomen. At Kerma (Nubia), a scarab seal with Prenomen.

Of Unknown Proevnance, scarab-seals with Prenomen (82).

=== Yakbim (nomen) ===
ya-k-b-mu. See Ryholt 1997:359 File 14/1

==== Seals ====
Levant. At Tel Kabri, scarab-seals with Nomen. At Tell Beit Mirsim, a scarab seal with Nomen.

Nubia. At Buhen (Nubia), a scarab seal with Nomen.

Of Unknown Provenance, scarab-seals with Nomen (26) Of Unknown Provenance, a round seal with Nomen. Of Unknown Provenance, a cylinder seal with Nomen.

=== Yakbim (Eldest King's Son) ===
There are seals referring to a King's Son and an Eldest King's Son Yakbim who apparently was not identical to King Yakbim.
