= Ammu Aahotepre =

Egyptian pharaoh

'Ammu Aahotepre
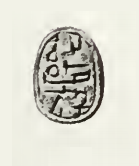
- Scarab seal with the prenomen Aahotepre

Pharaoh
- Reign: c. 15 years? 1760-1745 BC
- Predecessor: Qareh Khawoserre
- Successor: Sheshi Maaibre
Royal titulary
Prenomen
Aahotepre
ˁ3-ḥtp-Rˁ
Ra is greatly pleased
N5 aA a Htp
Nomen
'Ammu (plus epithet)
Son of Ra, perfect 'Ammu, given life
G39 N5 F35 D36 N35A X8 S34
- Dynasty: 14th Dynasty; Second Intermediate Period

'Ammu Aahotepre was a pharaoh of the 14th Dynasty who ruled over parts of Lower Egypt during the Second Intermediate Period.

== Attestations ==
This king is poorly attested, see Ryholt 1997:364-365 File 14:4. Like other kings of the dynasty, scarab seals are the only surviving evidence for his reign.

=== Scarab seals ===
'Ammu Aahotepre has 61 seals bearing his name: 30 for the nomen 'Ammu and 32 for the prenomen Aahotepre. The theory that 'Ammu and Aahotepre refer to the same ruler is not certain.

At Tell el-Ajjul, a scarab bearing the nomen of this king was discovered by Flinders Petrie in 1933.

==== Prenomen Aahotepre ====
Scarab seals from 1x Lachish, 2x Tell el-Ajjul, 1x Canaan (?), 1x Delta (?), 27x Provenance Unknown.

==== Nomen 'Ammu ====
Scarab seals from 2x Tell el-Ajjul, 1x Abydos, 1x Semna, 26x Provenance Unknown.

== Theories ==
His reign is believed to have lasted about 15 years, from 1760 BC until 1745 BC.

=== Identification ===
Ryholt (1997) identified king 'Ammu with Aahotepre in his reconstruction of the Turin canon. Von Beckerath (1964) had previously assigned the prenomen Aahotepre to a pharaoh of the Sixteenth dynasty of Egypt.

== See also ==
- Aamu

== Bibliography ==
- von Beckerath, Jürgen (1964), "2. Zwischenzeit", Archiv für Orientforschung
- Hayes, William C. (1973). "Egypt: From the death of Ammenemes III to Seqenenre II". The Cambridge Ancient History. Vol. 2. Cambridge: Cambridge University Press..
- Ryholt, K. S. B. (1997), The Political Situation in Egypt during the Second Intermediate Period, c. 1800 - 1550 BC, Copenhagen: Museum Tusculanum Press, ISBN 87-7289-421-0
