= Yaqub-Har =

Egyptian pharaoh from the 17th or 16th century BC

Meruserre Yaqub-Har
- Yakubher, Yakubhar, Yak-Baal
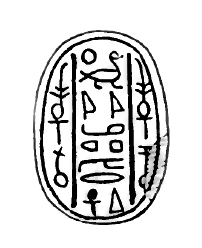
- Drawing of a scarab of Yaqub-Har by Flinders Petrie

Pharaoh
- Reign: 17th or 16th century BC
Royal titulary
Prenomen
Sa Ra Meruserre Jaqub-Har
S3-Rˁ mrj-wsr-Rˁ-yqbˁ-Hr
The son of Ra, strong is the love of Ra, Jaqub-Har
N5 G39 N5 U7D40 i i q b a r h
Nomen
Jaqub-Har
Yˁqp Hr
< i i a q p h r >
Jaqub-Har
Yˁqb Hr
< i i a q b h r >
Jaqub-Har
Yˁpq Hr
< i i a p q h r >
- Dynasty: 14th dynasty or 15th dynasty, possibly a vassal of the Hyksos king, highly uncertain

Meruserre Yaqub-Har (other spelling: Yakubher, also known as Yak-Baal) was a petty king using Egyptian attributes during the Egyptian Second Intermediate Period and attested in contexts belonging to the Middle Bronze Age IIA/B. His reign cannot be precisely dated, and even the dynasty to which he belonged is uncertain.

== Reign ==
=== Relative chronology ===
A scarab seal naming Yaqub-Har was found in a rock-cut tomb at Tel Shikmona dated to the transitional Middle Bronze Age IIA/B (MB IIA/B). Yaqub-Har may have been active in the final part of the MB IIA and early MB IIB (c. 1800-1570 BC).

In Egypt, the MB IIA/B marked the transition from early 13th dynasty to late 13th dynasty. Ryholt (1997) notes that the context at Shikmona would be contemporary to the late 13th dynasty, along with a sealing found at Kerma (Western Defufa) together with sealings of Yakbim and Sheshi also points to this period.

=== Kingship ===
In Egypt, there are no evidence that actually show he was a "King of Egypt". However, he used Egyptian style scarab seals and adopted a prenomen. His scarab seals are found in trade items that where shipped in Canaan, Nile Delta, Upper Egypt and Nubia. The seals only means that the goods came from an estate controlled by this petty ruler, and ended up in a long-distance trade network reaching the Levantine Tel Shikmona in the north to the Nubian Kerma in the south. In Canaan several local rulers and cities seem to have adopted Egyptian attributes and style.

Ryholt (1997) notes that Ya'qub-Har is never attested with the Egyptian title heka khasut (ruler of foreign lands), later used during the early Hyksos period. He did imitate the Egyptians by adopting a prenomen "Meruserre", while a cartouche was only occasionally used on seals of Yaqub-Har.

== Name ==
The name Ya'qub-Har is considered to derive from the Semitic root y'qb, and translated as "Protected by Har". Ryholt (1997), suggests that "-Har" refers to a Semitic deity or a specific West Semitic aspect of a divinity, rather than the Egyptian god Horus (Hr). The name Yaqub-Har is similar to the names Sakir-Har (Reward of Har or Har is Satisfied), Anat-Har (Anat is Satisfied), and Harsekher (see Dedumose I). Compare also king Hor and Harhotep (Egyptian Ḥr-ḥtp) translated as "Horus is at peace," "Horus is satisfied," or "Horus is content."

== Attestations ==
=== Scarab seals ===
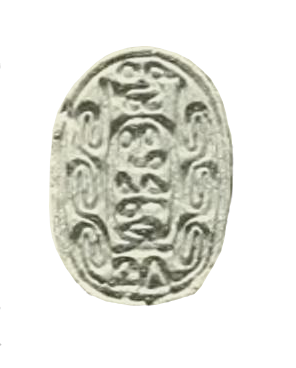
Scarab with the cartouche of Yaqub-Har in the British Museum (EA 40741).

Yaqub-Har is attested by about 27 scarab seals: 3x Canaan, 4x Egypt, 1x Nubia, and 19x Unknown Provenance. The wide geographic repartition of these scarabs indicate the existence of trade relations among the Nile Delta, Canaan, and Nubia during the Second Intermediate Period.

==== Egypt (4) ====
- At Tell el-Yahudiya, two scarab-seals.
- At Saqqara (?), Scarab-seal.
- At Hu, Scarab-seal.

==== Canaan (3) ====
- At Tel Shikmona (Israel), a scarab seal of Yaqub-Har was found in an archaeological context dating to the Middle Bronze IIA/B (MB IIA/B). The seal is practically identical to other known seals of Yaqub-Har. At Tell el-Daba, strata F is contemporary with MB IIA/B while strata E/3 (late 13th dyn, 14th dyn.), E/2 (15th dyn. Hyksos period begins) and E/1 (Khyan) date to the MB IIB. He may have been a predecessor of Khyan, predating the 15th Dynasty.
- At Pella (Jordan), a scarab seal (present location unknown).
- Of Unknown Provenance in Canaan, bought in Jerusalem, a scarab seal.

==== Nubia (1) ====
- At Kerma (Nubia), a seal-impression, in same context as seals of Yakbim and Sheshi.

== Theories ==
=== Chronological position ===
The dynasty to which Yaqub-Har belongs is debated, with Yaqub-Har being seen variously as a 14th Dynasty king, an early Hyksos ruler of the 15th Dynasty or a vassal of the Hyksos kings.

==== Fourteenth Dynasty ====
The 14th Dynasty of Egypt has ruled the eastern Delta region just prior to the arrival of the Hyksos in Egypt. The Danish specialist Kim Ryholt has suggested that Yaqub-Har was a king of the late 14th Dynasty and the last one of this dynasty to be known from contemporary attestations. Since the name "Yaqub-Har" may have a West Semitic origin, meaning "Protected by Har", Yaqub-Har would then be a 14th Dynasty ruler. Ryholt's argument is based on the observation that while early Hyksos kings of the 15th Dynasty, such as Sakir-Har, used the title Heka-Khawaset, later Hyksos rulers adopted the traditional Egyptian royal titulary. This change happened under Khyan, who ruled as the Heka-Khawaset early in his reign, but later adopted the Egyptian prenomen Seuserenre. Later Hyksos kings, such as Apophis, abandoned the Heka-Khawaset title and retained instead the customary Egyptian prenomen, just like the kings of the 14th Dynasty. Ryholt then notes that Yaqub-Har himself always used a prenomen, Meruserre, which suggests that he either ruled at the end of the 15th Dynasty or was a member of the 14th Dynasty. Since the end of the 15th Dynasty is known not to have included a ruler by the name of Meruserre, Ryholt concludes that Yaqub-Har was a 14th Dynasty ruler.

==== Fifteenth Dynasty ====
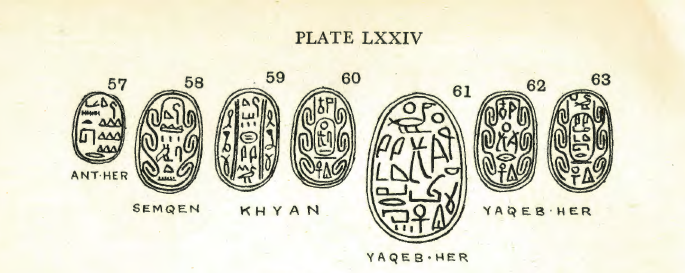
Scarabs of Khyan and Yaqub-Har, Petrie, "The Making of Egypt"

On the other hand, Daphna Ben-Tor and Suzanne Allen note that Yaqub-Har's scarab seals are stylistically almost identical with those of the well-attested Hyksos king Khyan. This suggests that Yaqub-Har was either Khyan's immediate 15th Dynasty successor or a vassal of the Hyksos king who ruled a part of the Egyptian Delta under Khyan's authority. As Ben-Tor writes, "Supporting evidence for the Fifteenth Dynasty affiliation of King Yaqubhar is provided by the close stylistic similarity between his scarabs and the scarabs of King Khayan". Additionally, the form of the wsr-sign used in these kings' royal prenomina "argue for a chronological proximity [between Yaqub-Har and Khyan] and against Ryholt's assigning of Yaqub-Har to the Fourteenth Dynasty and Khayan to the Fifteenth Dynasty."

== Popular speculation ==
In Exodus Decoded, filmmaker Simcha Jacobovici suggested that Yaqub-Har was the Patriarch Jacob, on the basis of a signet ring found in the Hyksos capital Avaris that read "Yakov/Yakub" (from Yaqub-her), similar to the Hebrew name of the Biblical patriarch Jacob (Ya'aqov). Yakov and its variants are common Semitic names from the period, but Jacobovici provides no explanation as to why Joseph would have a signet ring with the name of his father Jacob.
