= William Ayres Ward =

American Egyptologist

- Born: June 10, 1928; Chicago
- Died: September 13, 1996 (aged 68); Providence, Rhode Island
- Occupation: Egyptology

William Ayres Ward (June 10, 1928 – September 13, 1996) was an American Egyptologist.

== Biography ==
Born in Chicago, Ward studied at the Butler University in Indianapolis and received his B.A. in History of religions in 1951. Then, he attained a MA in Egyptology at the University of Chicago in 1955 and a PhD in Semitic languages at the Brandeis University in 1958. He then taught in Beirut, first at the Beirut College for Women and later, since 1963, at the American University of Beirut. From 1986 until his death in 1996, he was a visiting professor at Brown University in Providence, Rhode Island.

His main areas of research included the relations between Egypt and Levant, Egyptian-Semitic etymology, as well as scarabs and titles of the Old and Middle Kingdom of Egypt.

== Sources ==
- Leonard H. Lesko (ed.), Ancient Egyptian and Mediterranean Studies in Memory of William A. Ward. Department of Egyptology Brown University, Providence 1998, ISBN 0-9662685-0-4.
- Morris L. Bierbrier, Who was who in Egyptology. 4th revised edition. Egypt Exploration Society, London 2012, ISBN 978-0-85698-207-1, p. 267.
