= Kim Ryholt =

Danish egyptologist (born 1970)

Kim Steven Bardrum Ryholt (born 19 June 1970) is a Danish Egyptologist. He is a professor of Egyptology at the University of Copenhagen and a specialist on Egyptian history and literature. He is director of the research center Canon and Identity Formation in the Earliest Literate Societies under the University of Copenhagen Programme of Excellence (since 2008) and director of The Papyrus Carlsberg Collection & Project (since 1999).

== Research ==
One of his most significant publications is a 1997 book titled The Political Situation in Egypt during the Second Intermediate Period c. 1800–1550 B.C. Aidan Dodson, a prominent English Egyptologist, calls Ryholt's book "fundamental" for an understanding of the Second Intermediate Period because it reviews the political history of this period and contains an updated—and more accurate—reconstruction of the Turin Canon since the 1959 publication of Alan Gardiner's Royal Canon of Egypt. It also contains an extensive catalogue of all the known monuments, inscriptions and seals for the kings of this period.

Ryholt is also a specialist on Demotic papyri and literature and has authored numerous books and articles about this subject. In 2011 he discovered the identity of the famous sage king Nechepsos.

Since 2013 he has directed a project on ancient ink as technology.

He has also written a book on antiquities trade with Fredrik Norland Hagen.

== Second Intermediate Period ==
Ryholt's study makes note of numerous recent archaeological finds including the discovery of a new Hyksos king named Sakir-Har, the find of a doorjamb at Gebel Antef in the mid-1990s which establishes that Sekhemre Shedtawy Sobekemsaf (Sobekemsaf II here) was the father of the 17th Dynasty Theban kings Antef VI and Antef VII. He also discusses Ahmose's Unwetterstele document.

The book also argues strongly that the Sixteenth dynasty of Egypt was made up of poorly attested Theban kings such as Nebiriau I, Nebiriau II, Seuserenre Bebiankh and Sekhemre Shedwast who are documented in the last surviving page of the Turin Canon rather than minor Hyksos vassal kings in Lower Egypt, as was generally believed.

Among the most significant discussions is Ryholt's evidence that Sekhemre Khutawy Sobekhotep rather than Ugaf was the first king of Egypt's 13th Dynasty, and a discussion of the foreign origins of the Semitic 13th Dynasty king named Khendjer—whose reign lasted a minimum of 4 years and 3 months based on dated workmen's control notes found on stone blocks from his pyramid complex.

The most controversial conclusion concerns the identity and dating of 14th Dynasty. Ryholt – like Manfred Bietak – argues that it was a forerunner of the 15th Dynasty, but differs in regarding it as contemporary with the 13th Dynasty from the latter's founding around 1800 BC until its collapse in c. 1650/1648 BC. This view is questioned in a review of the book by Daphna Ben Tor and James/Susan Allen. Ryholt has also suggested that Maaibre Sheshi, one of the best attested kings of the 14th Dynasty, was contemporary with the early 13th Dynasty on the basis of an archaeological deposit at Uronarti where a seal-impression of this king was found together with impressions of two early 13th dynasty Egyptian kings. Ben Tor has posited that the context of Maaibre Sheshi seal is not secure and that it was most likely a New Kingdom seal impression. The likelihood of New Kingdom intrusions into the Uronarti context was confirmed by Yvonne Markowitz and acknowledged by Reisner. Ryholt's proposal that king Sheshi, 'Ammu Ahotepre and Yakbim Sekhaenre were rulers of the 14th Dynasty is contested by Ben Tor's study of the strata levels of their seals which, in her view, indicate dating to the second half of the Hyksos 15th Dynasty and are not contemporary with the 13th dynasty.

== Turin King List ==
Ryholt is regarded as a major scholar in the study of the Turin King List, having examined the document in person twice. He has published new and better interpretations of this damaged papyrus document in his aforementioned 1997 book and in a ZAS paper titled "The Late Old Kingdom in the Turin King-list and the Identity of Nitocris", and has published a detailed discussion of the nature of the document. Ryholt reportedly intends to publish his study of the Turin Kinglist in the near future.

== Selected publications ==
- Ryholt, Kim, and Gojko Barjamovic, eds. (2020). Libraries before Alexandria: Ancient Near Eastern Traditions. Oxford, New York: Oxford University Press.
- The Political Situation in Egypt during the Second Intermediate Period, c. 1800–1550 B.C. (Carsten Niebuhr Institute Publications. Vol. 20, ISSN 0902-5499). Copenhagen 1997, ISBN 87-7289-421-0.
- The Story of Petese son of Petetum, and Seventy Other Good and Bad Stories. (The Carlsberg Papyri. Vol. 4, ISSN 0907-8118 = Carsten Niebuhr Institute Publications. Vol. 23, ISSN 0902-5499). Copenhagen 1999, ISBN 87-7289-527-6.
- The Petese Stories II (The Carlsberg Papyri. Vol. 6, ISSN 0907-8118 = Carsten Niebuhr Institute Publications. Vol. 29, ISSN 0902-5499). Copenhagen 2005, ISBN 87-635-0404-9.
- Narrative Literature from the Tebtunis Temple Library (The Carlsberg Papyri. Vol. 10, ISSN 0907-8118 = Carsten Niebuhr Institute Publications. Vol. 35, ISSN 0902-5499). Copenhagen 2012, ISBN 978-87-635-0780-6.
- (with T. Christiansen) Catalogue of Egyptian Funerary Papyri in Danish Collections (The Carlsberg Papyri. Vol. 13, ISSN 0907-8118 = Carsten Niebuhr Institute Publications. Vol. 41, ISSN 0902-5499). Copenhagen 2016, ISBN 978-87-635-4374-3.
- (with F. Hagen) The Antiquities Trade in Egypt, 1880s–1930s: The H.O. Lange Papers (Scientia Danica. Series H, Humanistica, 4, Vol. 8, ISSN 1904-5506). Copenhagen 2016, ISBN 978-87-7304-400-1.
- The Turin King-List in Ägypten und Levante / Egypt and the Levant 14, 2004, pp.135-155 PDF
