= Avaris =

Archaeological site in Egypt

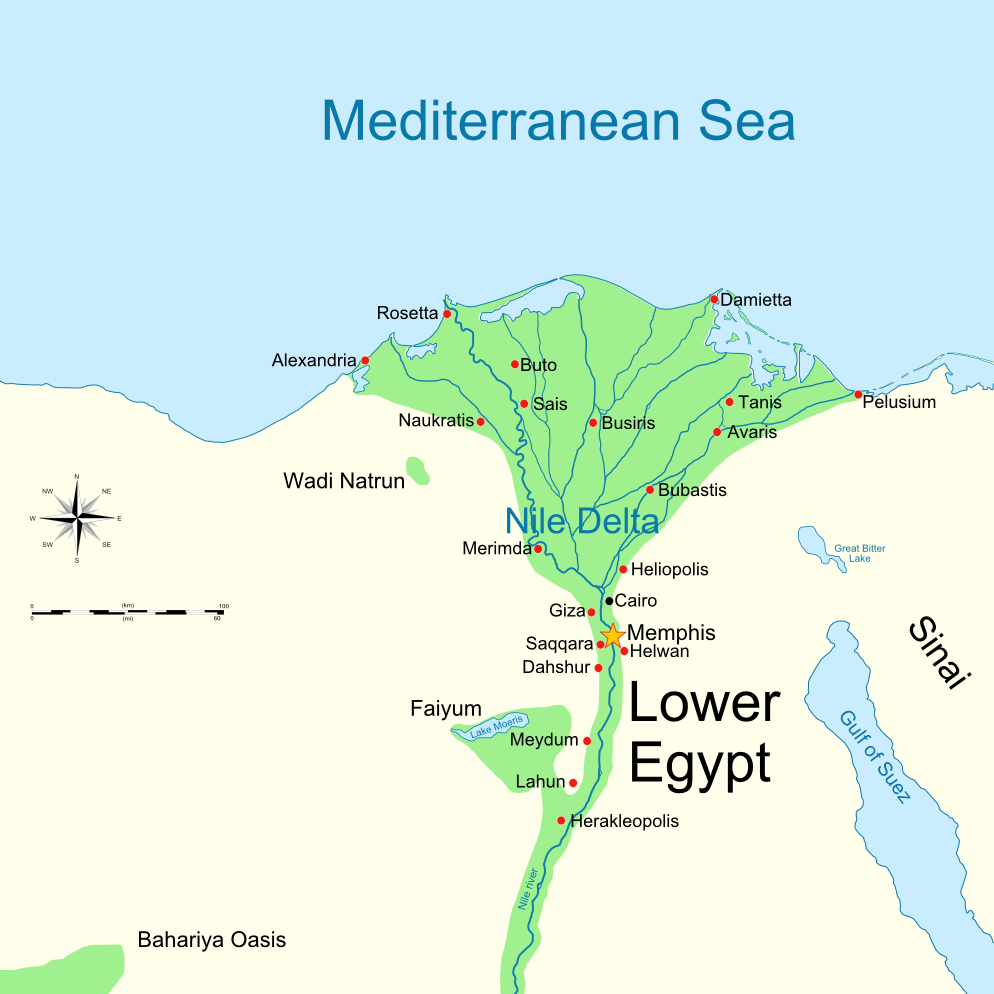
- Map of ancient Lower Egypt showing Avaris

- Location within Egypt
- 30°47′14.7″N 31°49′16.9″E
- Type: Settlement
- Location: Sharqia Governorate, Egypt
- Region: Lower Egypt

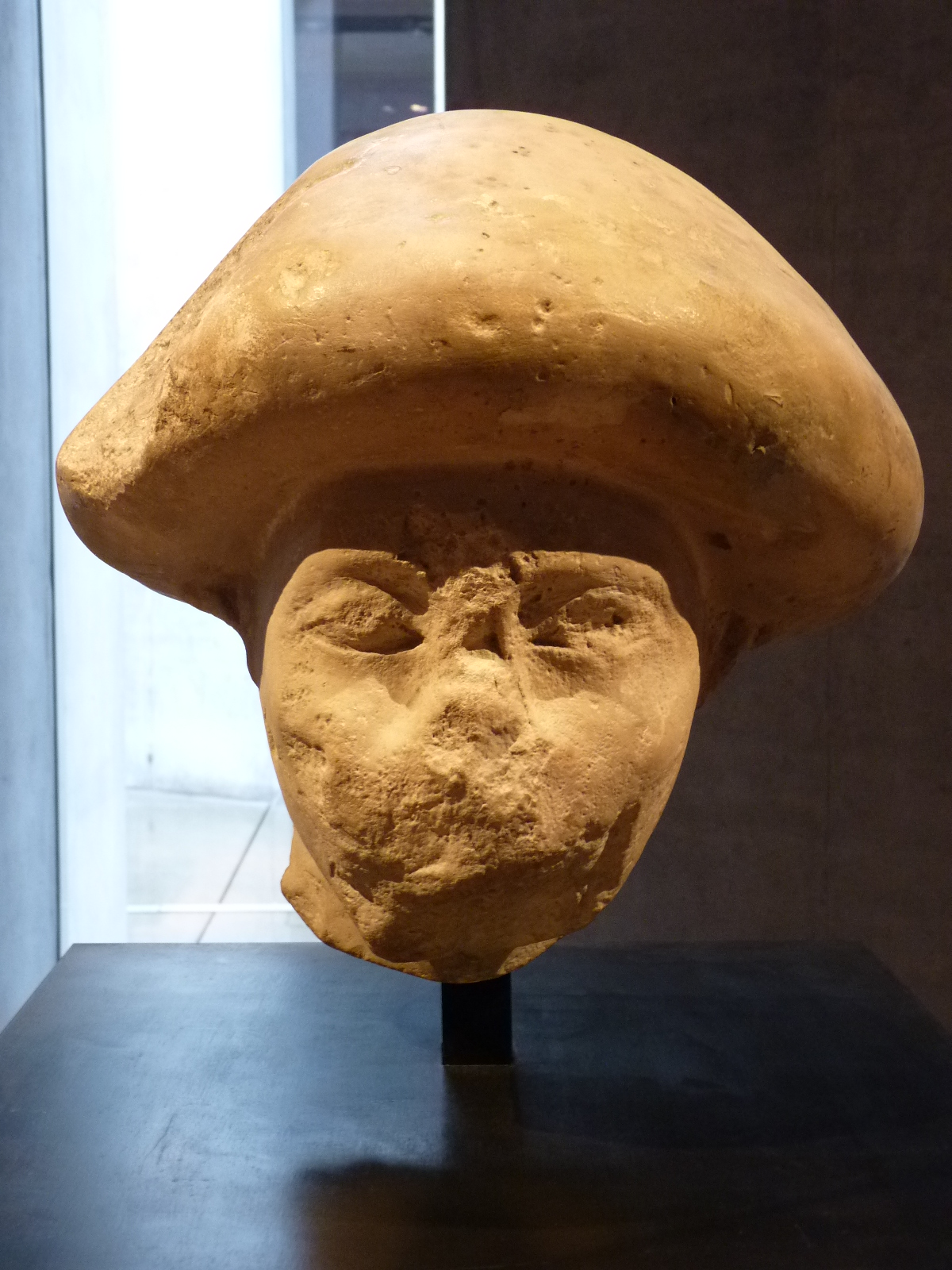
An official wearing the "mushroom-headed" hairstyle also seen in contemporary paintings of Western Asiatic foreigners, from Avaris, the capital of the Hyksos. Dated to 1802–1640 BC. Staatliche Sammlung für Ägyptische Kunst.

Avaris (Egyptian: ḥw.t wꜥr.t, sometimes hut-waret; Ancient Greek: Αὔαρις, romanized: Auaris; Greek: Άβαρις, romanized: Avaris; Egyptian Arabic: اڤاريس, romanized: Avaris) was the Hyksos capital of Egypt located at the modern site of Tell el-Dab'a in the northeastern region of the Nile Delta. As the main course of the Nile migrated eastward, its position at the hub of Egypt's delta emporia made it a major capital suitable for trade. It was occupied from around the 18th century BC until its capture by Ahmose I in the 16th century BC.

== Etymology ==
The name in the Egyptian language of the 2nd millennium BC was probably pronounced /*ḥaʔət-waʕrəʔ/ ('House of the Region') and denotes the capital of an administrative division of the land (wʕr.t). Alternatively, Clement of Alexandria referred to the name of this city as Athyria.

== Excavations ==
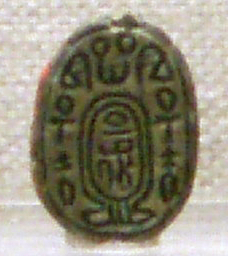
Scarab bearing the name of the Hyksos King Apepi, now at the Museum of Fine Arts, Boston

In 1885, the Swiss Édouard Naville started the first excavations in the area around Tell-el-Daba. Between 1941 and 1942, Labib Habachi, an Egyptian Egyptologist first forwarded the idea that the site could be identified with Avaris. Between 1966 and 1969 and since 1975, the site has been excavated by the Austrian Archaeological Institute. Using radar imaging technology, its scientists could identify in 2010 the outline of the city including streets, houses, a port, and a side arm of the River Nile passing through the city.

The site at Tell el-Dab'a, covering an area of about 2 square kilometers, is in ruins today, but excavations have shown that, at one point, it was a well-developed center of trade with a busy harbour catering to over 300 ships during a trading season. Artifacts excavated at a temple erected in the Hyksos period have produced goods from all over the Aegean world. The temple even has Minoan-like wall paintings that are similar to those found on Crete at the Palace of Knossos. A large mudbrick tomb has also been excavated to the west of the temple, where grave goods, such as copper swords, have been found.

== History ==
=== Foundation ===
The site was originally founded by Amenemhat I on the eastern branch of the Nile in the Delta. Its close proximity to Asia made it a popular town for Asiatic immigrants, most of whom were culturally Egyptianized, using Egyptian pottery, but also retained many aspects of their own culture, as can be seen from the various Asiatic burials including weapons of Levantine origin. One palatial district appears to have been abandoned as a result of an epidemic during the Thirteenth Dynasty.

=== Hyksos conquest ===
In the 18th century BC, the Hyksos conquered Lower Egypt and set up Avaris as their capital. Kamose, the last pharaoh of the Seventeenth Dynasty, besieged Avaris but was unable to defeat the Hyksos there.

=== Recapture by Egyptians ===
Ahmose I captured Avaris and overran the Hyksos. Canaanite-style artifacts dated to the Tuthmosid or New Kingdom period suggest that a large part of the city's Semitic population remained in residence following its reconquest by the Egyptians.

The pharaohs of the Eighteenth Dynasty set up a capital in Thebes and the palatial complex at Avaris was briefly abandoned, but areas such as the Temple of Seth and G6 region remained continuously occupied. It appears as well, that the site of Avaris had gone through a hiatus ceasing to be a political centre, dated after the time of Amenhotep II and until the late 18th dynasty.

=== Ramesside period ===
After Ramesses II constructed the city of Pi-Ramesses roughly 2 km (1.2 mi) to the north, Avaris was superseded by Pi-Ramesses. Parts of the former site of Avaris were used by the inhabitants of Pi-Ramesses as a cemetery and burial ground, and a large portion of it was used as a major navy base, while the "Harbor of Avaris" toponym continued to be used for Avaris' harbor through the Ramesside period. The newly constructed city served as a key administrative and military seat of governance.

The name "Avaris" is also referred to in Papyrus Sallier I in the late 13th century BC. In addition, the "Avaris" toponym is also known to Manetho in the 3rd century BC, quoted by Josephus in his Against Apion 1.14.

== Urban chronology ==
- Stratigraphic layers M-N

Amenemhet I (12th dynasty) planned a settlement, called Hutwaret located in the 19th Nome, circa 1930 BC. It was a small Egyptian town until about 1830 BC when it began to grow by immigration of Canaanites (Levant Middle Bronze Age IIA) By 1800 BC it was a much larger trade colony under Egyptian control. Over the next 100 years immigration increased the size of the city. Scarabs with the name "Retjenu" have been found in Avaris, also dating to the 12th Dynasty (1991-1802 BCE).

- Stratigraphic layers G

At about 1780 a temple to Set was built. The Canaanites living at Avaris considered the Egyptian god Set to be the Canaanite god Hadad. Both were weather gods.

- Stratigraphic layers F

Around 1700 BC a temple district to the Canaanite Asherah and the Egyptian Hathor was built in the eastern part of the city. From 1700 onward, social stratification begins and an elite arise.

- Stratigraphic layers E

In 1650 the Hyksos arrive and the city grows to 250 ha. It is believed that Avaris was the largest city in the world from 1670 to 1557 BC. A large citadel was built around 1550.

== Minoan connection ==
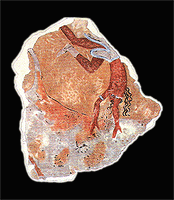
Fragment of a Minoan fresco found in Avaris, Egypt. This fresco is very similar to another fresco from Knossos, Crete.

Avaris, along with Tel Kabri in Israel and Alalakh in Syria, also has a record of Minoan civilization, which is otherwise quite rare in the Levant. Manfred Bietak, an Austrian archaeologist and excavator of Tell Dab'a, has speculated that there was close contact between the rulers of Avaris and the Minoans, and that the large building featuring frescoes allowed the Minoans to maintain a ritual life in Egypt. French archaeologist Yves Duhoux proposed the existence of a Minoan 'colony' on an island in the Nile Delta.

== See also ==
- List of ancient Egyptian towns and cities
- List of historical capitals of Egypt

== Bibliography ==
- Carl Nicholas Reeves (2000). Ancient Egypt: the great discoveries : a year-by-year chronicle. Thames & Hudson. ISBN 978-0-500-05105-4.
- Manfred Bietak (1996). Avaris, the capital of the Hyksos: recent excavations at Tell el-Dabʻa. British Museum Press for the Trustees of the British Museum. ISBN 978-0-7141-0968-8.
- Bietak, Manfred (2022). "Avaris/Tell el-Dab'a". In Bagnall, Roger S.; et al. (eds.). The Encyclopedia of Ancient History. John Wiley & Sons. pp. 1–16. doi:10.1002/9781444338386.wbeah15052.pub2. ISBN 9781405179355.

| Preceded by Thebes | Capital of Egypt; 1785 BC - 1580 BC | Succeeded by Thebes |
