= List of state leaders in the 18th century BC =

State leaders in the 19th century BC – State leaders in the 17th century BC – State leaders by year

This is a list of state leaders in the 18th century BC (1800–1701 BC).

== Africa: Northeast ==
Egypt: Second Intermediate Period

- Thirteenth Dynasty of the Second Intermediate Period (complete list) –

- Sonbef, King (1800/1799–1796/1795 BC)
- Nerikare, King (1796 BC)
- Sekhemkare, King (1796–1793 BC)
- Ameny Qemau, King (1793–1791 BC)
- Hotepibre, King (1791–1788 BC)
- Iufni, King (c.1788 BC)
- Amenemhet VI, King (1788–1785 BC)
- Semenkare Nebnuni, King (1785–1783 BC)
- Sehetepibre, King (1783–1781 BC)
- Sewadjkare, King (c.1781 BC)
- Nedjemibre, King (c.1780 BC)
- Khaankhre Sobekhotep, King (c.1735 BC)
- Renseneb, King (c.1777 BC)
- Hor, King (1777–1775 BC)
- Sekhemrekhutawy Khabaw, King (1775–1772 BC)
- Djedkheperew, King (1772–1770 BC)
- Sebkay, King (c.1770 BC)
- Sedjefakare, King (1770–1765 BC)
- Wegaf, King (1794–1757 BC)
- Khendjer, King (1764–1759 BC)
- Imyremeshaw, King (1759 BC–?)
- Sehetepkare Intef, King (c.1754 BC)
- Seth Meribre, King (?–1749 BC)
- Sobekhotep III, King (c.1740 BC)
- Neferhotep I, King (c.1742–1733 BC)
- Sihathor, Coregent King (with Neferhotep I)
- Sobekhotep IV, King (c.1728 BC)
- Merhotepre Sobekhotep, King (c.1721 BC)
- Sobekhotep VI, King (1719–1715 BC)
- Wahibre Ibiau, King (c.1714–1702 BC)
- Merneferre Ay, King (c.1701–1677 BC)

- Fourteenth Dynasty of the Second Intermediate Period (complete list) –

- Yakbim Sekhaenre, King (1805–1780 BC)
- Ya'ammu Nubwoserre, King (1780–1770 BC)
- Qareh, King (1770–1760 BC)
- Aahotepre, King (late-18th century BC)
- Sheshi, King (late-18th century BC)
- Nehesy, King (c.1705 BC)
- Khakherewre, King (c.1705 BC)
- Nebefawre, King (c.1704 BC)
- Sehebre, King (c.1704–1699)

== Asia ==
=== Asia: East ===
China

Type	Name	Title	Royal house	From	To	Refs
Posthumous Names (Shi Hao 諡號)^{1}
Order	Reign^{2}	Chinese	Pinyin	Notes		
01	45	禹	Yǔ	Also Yu the Great (大禹; Dà Yǔ)		
02	10	啟	Qǐ	Son of Yu		
03	29	太康	Tai Kang			
04	13	仲康	Zhòng Kāng			
05	28	相	Xiāng			
06	21	少康	Shào Kāng	Restored the corrupt Xia dynasty		
07	17	杼	Zhù			
08	26	槐	Huái			
09	18	芒	Máng			
10	16	泄	Xiè	Son of Mang		
11	59	不降	Bù Jiàng			
12	21	扃	Jiōng			
13	21	廑	Jǐn	Guoyu: Jǐn or Jìn, putonghua: Jǐn		
14	31	孔甲	Kǒng Jiǎ			
15	11	皋	Gāo			
16	11	發	Fā			
Sovereign	Jin	King	Xia dynasty	1810 BC	1789 BC	
Sovereign	Kong Jia	King	Xia dynasty	1789 BC	1758 BC	
Sovereign	Gao	King	Xia dynasty	1758 BC	1747 BC	
Sovereign	Fa	King	Xia dynasty	1747 BC	1728 BC	
Sovereign	Jie	King	Xia dynasty	1728 BC	1675 BC	

=== Asia: Southeast ===
Vietnam

- Hồng Bàng dynasty (complete list) –

- Tốn line, (c.1912–c.1713 BC)
- Ly line, (c.1712–c.1632 BC)

=== Asia: West ===
Assyria

- Assyria: Early Assyrian period (complete list) –

Type	Name	Title	Royal house	From	To	Refs
Sovereign	Shamshi-Adad I	King	—	1813 BC	1791 BC or 1781 BC	
Sovereign	Ishme-Dagan I	King	—	1790 BC	1751 BC	
Sovereign	Mut-Ashkur	King	—	1750 BC or 1730 BC	1720 BC	
Sovereign	Rimush	King	—	?	?	
Sovereign	Asinum	King	—	?	?	
Sovereign	Adasi	King	—	1720 BC	1701 BC	

Babylonia

- Old Babylonian Empire (complete list) –

Type	Name	Title	Royal house	From	To	Refs
Sovereign	Sumu-la-El	King	First dynasty	1817 BC	1781 BC	
Sovereign	Sabium	King	First dynasty	1781 BC	1767 BC	
Sovereign	Apil-Sin	King	First dynasty	1767 BC	1749 BC	
Sovereign	Sin-Muballit	King	First dynasty	1748 BC	1729 BC	
Sovereign	Hammurabi	King	First dynasty	1728 BC	1686 BC	

Ebla

- Ebla: Third Eblaite kingdom (complete list) –

- Immeya, King (c.1750–1725 BC)

Elam

- Elam: Sukkalmah dynasty (complete list) –

- Shiruk-tuh, King (fl.c.1792–1763 BC)
- Shimut-wartash I, King (c.1790–1763 BC)
- Siwe-Palar-Khuppak, King (c. 1778 – c. 1745 BC)
- Kudu-zulush I, King (fl.c.1765–1730 BC)
- Kutir-Nahhunte I, King (fl.c.1730–1700 BC)
- Lila-irtash, King (fl.c.1710–1698 BC)
