= Renseneb =

Egyptian pharaoh

- Ranisonb

Pharaoh
- Reign: 4 months, 1777 BC
- Predecessor: Khaankhre Sobekhotep
- Successor: Hor Awybre
Royal titulary
Nomen
Turin canon:
Renseneb
Rn(j)-[s]nb(w)
My name is healthy
< r n A2 s n b Y1 >
- Father: uncertain, possibly Seankhibre Ameny Antef Amenemhat VI
- Dynasty: 13th Dynasty

Renseneb Amenemhat (also known as Ranisonb) was an Egyptian pharaoh of the 13th Dynasty during the Second Intermediate Period. According to egyptologist Kim Ryholt, Renseneb was the 14th king of the dynasty, while Detlef Franke sees him as the 13th ruler and Jürgen von Beckerath as the 16th. Renseneb is poorly attested and his throne name remains unknown.

== Attestations ==
Renseneb is known primarily thanks to the Turin King List where he appears in Column 7, line 16 (Gardiner col. 6 line 6). He is credited a reign of four months.

Renseneb is otherwise known from a single contemporary object, a bead of glazed steatite, last seen by Percy Newberry in an antique dealer shop in Cairo in 1929. The bead reads "Ranisonb Amenemhat, who gives life". The Danish Egyptologist Kim Ryholt interprets this double name as meaning "Ranisonb [Son of] Amenemhat" thereby showing that he was a son of a king Amenemhat. The closest predecessor of Renseneb whose nomen is known to have been Amenemhat was Seankhibre Ameny Antef Amenemhet VI, who ruled about 10 years earlier. However, the nomina of three intervening kings, Sehetepibre, Sewadjkare and Nedjemibre, are unknown and could have been Amenemhat. One of them could thus be Renseneb's father, or (older) brothers in succession.

Other researchers such as Stephen Quirke do not follow him in this interpretation.

Renseneb's successor, Hor, could have been of non-royal birth since he never reported his parentage. Consequently, Ryholt proposed that Hor usurped the throne. In any case the ephemeral reigns of the rulers of the early 13th Dynasty point to the general political instability of the time.

Preceded by Khaankhre Sobekhotep	Pharaoh of Egypt; Thirteenth Dynasty	Succeeded by Hor
