= Iufni =

Egyptian pharaoh

- Jewefni, Efni, Afnai

Pharaoh
- Reign: very short c. 1788 BC (Ryholt) or 1741 BC (Franke)
- Predecessor: Hotepibre Qemau Siharnedjheritef (Ryholt) or Sehetepibre Sewesekhtawy (Franke)
- Successor: Seankhibre Ameny Antef Amenemhet VI
Royal titulary
Nomen
Iufni
Iw.f-n.i
He belongs to me
G39 N5 < i Z7 f n&A1 >
- Dynasty: 13th Dynasty

Iufni (also Jewefni) was an ancient Egyptian pharaoh of the 13th Dynasty during the Second Intermediate Period.

== Attestation ==
Iufni is only known from the Turin canon, a king list compiled around 500 years after Iufni's reign, during the early Ramesside period. According to Ryholt's latest reconstruction of the Turin canon, his name is given on column 7 row 9 of the document (this corresponds to column 6 row 9 in Alan H. Gardiner's and von Beckerath's reading of the canon).

== Family ==
Ryholt notes that Iufni's two predecessors Ameny Qemau and Hotepibre Qemau Siharnedjheritef as well as his successor Seankhibre Ameny Antef Amenemhet VI all bear filiative nomina—that is, names that connect them to their father. Since such nomina were used by pharaohs only when their fathers were also pharaohs and since Iufni reigned in their midst, Ryholt argues that Iufni must have been part of the family including Sekhemkare Amenmhat V, Ameny Qemau, Siharnedjheritef and Amenemhat VI. Given the brevity of Iufni's reign, Ryholt proposes that he may have been a brother of Siharnedjheritef or simply a grandson of Amenemhat V.

== Speculations ==
According to the Egyptologists Kim Ryholt and Darrell Baker he was the 7th king of the dynasty, while Jürgen von Beckerath and Detlef Franke see him as the 6th ruler. Iufni reigned from Memphis for a very short time c. 1788 BC or 1741 BC.

Preceded by Hotepibre Qemau Siharnedjheritef	Pharaoh of Egypt; Thirteenth Dynasty	Succeeded by Seankhibre Ameny Antef Amenemhet VI
