= Amenemhat VI =

Egyptian pharaoh

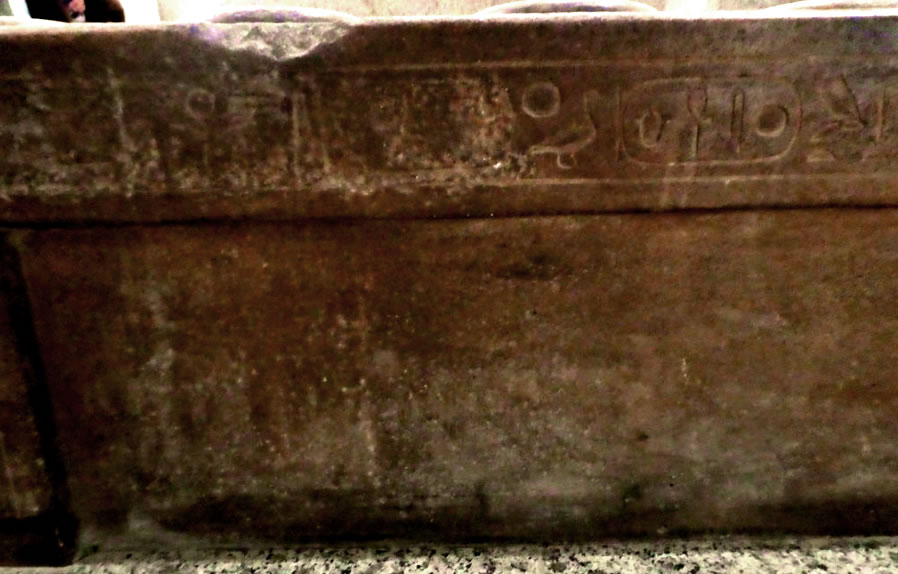
- The name Seankhibre on the offering table of Karnak

Pharaoh
- Reign: 1788–1785 BC, c. 1740 BC
- Predecessor: Iufni
- Successor: Semenkare Nebnuni (Ryholt, Franke)
Royal titulary
Horus name
Seherutawy
(S.hrw-t3.w(j))
He who satisfies the two lands
G5	s h r tA tA
Nebty name
Sekhemkhau
(Sḫm-ḫˁw)
He whose apparitions are powerful
G16	s sxm xa a w
Golden Horus
Heqamaat
(ḥq3-m3ˁt)
He who rules with Maat
G8	HqA mAat
Prenomen
Seankhibre
(Sˁ-ˁnḫ-jb-Rˁ)
He who causes the heart of Ra to live
M23 t L2 t < ra s anx ib >
Nomen
(Ameni Antef) Amenemhat
(Jmnj Jn-(j)t=f-Jmn-m-ḥ3t)
Ameny is his father, Amun is in front
G39 N5 < i mn n i i ini n&t&f i mn n m HAt t >
- Children: uncertain, conjectural: Renseneb
- Father: uncertain, possibly Sekhemkare Amenemhat V
- Dynasty: Thirteenth Dynasty of Egypt

See Amenemhat, for other individuals with this name.

Seankhibre Ameny Antef Amenemhat VI was an Egyptian pharaoh of the early Thirteenth Dynasty.

Amenemhat VI certainly enjoyed a short reign, estimated at 3 years or shorter. He is attested by a few contemporary artefacts and is listed on two different king lists. He may belong to a larger family of pharaohs including Amenemhat V, Ameny Qemau, Hotepibre Qemau Siharnedjheritef and Iufni.

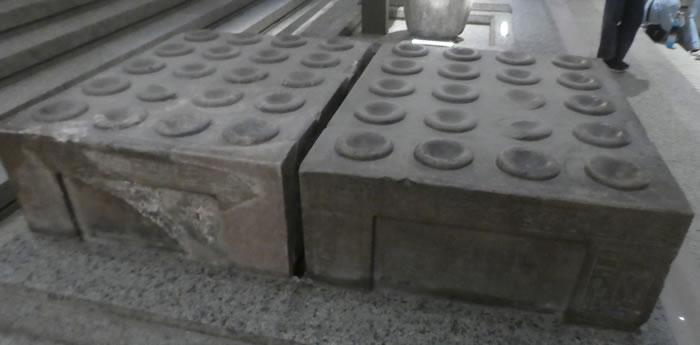
The offering table in the Grand Egyptian Museum

== Attestations ==
Historical

Amenemhat VI is listed on the Turin canon, a king list redacted in the early Ramesside period and which serves as the primary historical source regarding the Second Intermediate Period. In the latest reading of the canon by the Danish Egyptologist Kim Ryholt, Amenemhat VI appears in the 7th column, 10th row under his prenomen Seankhibre. This corresponds to the 6th column, 10th row in Alan Gardiner's and Jürgen von Beckerath's reading of the Turin king list.

Amenemhat VI is also mentioned on the Karnak king list, entry 37.

Archeological

Amenemhat VI is attested by a few contemporary artefacts. These include 2 cylinder seals from el-Mahamid el-Qibli in Upper Egypt, one of which is dedicated to "Sobek Lord of Sumenu". An offering table bearing Amenemhat VI's cartouche has been discovered in Karnak and is now in the Egyptian Museum, CG 23040. A stele from Abydos mentions an official, Seankhibre-Seneb-Senebefeni, whose name is likely a basilophorous one, dedicated to Seankhibre Amenemhat.

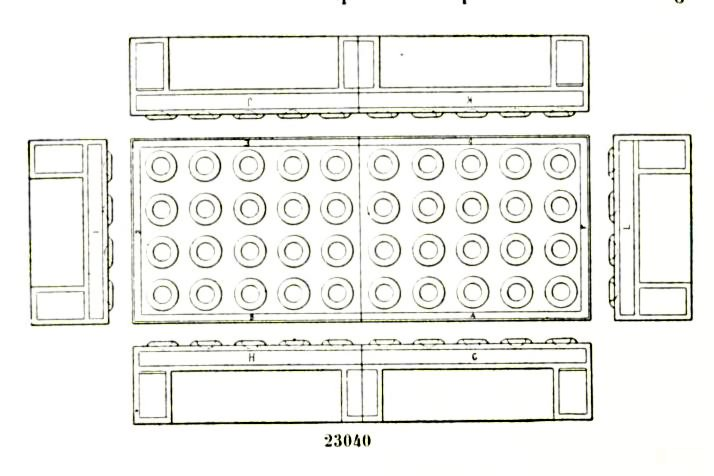
Drawing of the offering table CG 23040, bearing Amenemhat VI's cartouches

An architrave from a private tomb of the necropolis of Heliopolis bears the name Seankhibre within a cartouche However, recent research indicates that the latter monument may belong to a different king with a similar name, Seankhibtawy Seankhibra.

== Chronology ==
Relative chronological position

The relative chronological position of Amenemhat VI is secured thanks to the Turin canon. His predecessor was a poorly known pharaoh named Iufni and his successor was an equally obscure king, Semenkare Nebnuni.

Absolute position and dating

The absolute chronological position of Amenemhat VI is less certain owing to uncertainties affecting the earlier kings of the dynasty. According to Kim Ryholt and Darrell Baker, he was the 8th king of the dynasty, whereas Thomas Schneider, Detlef Franke and von Beckerath see him as the 7th ruler.

The duration of Amenemhat's reign is lost due to the poor state of preservation of the Turin papyrus and only the number of days is readable as [...] and 23 days. Ryholt nonetheless assigns him a short reign of 3 years spanning 1788–1785 BC.

== Extent of rule ==
It is unclear whether or not Amenemhat VI reigned over the whole of Egypt. He likely had control over Lower Nubia, which had been conquered by the 12th Dynasty and would not be abandoned before at least another 60 years. His control over Lower Egypt is debated. Ryholt believes that the Canaanite 14th Dynasty was already in existence at the time, forming an independent realm controlling at least the Eastern Nile Delta. While this analysis is accepted by some scholars—among them, Gae Callender, Janine Bourriau and Darrell Baker, it is rejected by others including Manfred Bietak, Daphna Ben-Tor and James and Susan Allen who contend that the 14th Dynasty could not have existed before the later king of the 13th Dynasty Sobekhotep IV.

== Family ==
The Egyptologist Kim Ryholt proposes that Amenemhat VI was a member of a larger royal family including pharaohs Sekhemkare Amenemhat V, Ameny Qemau, Hotepibre Qemau Siharnedjheritef and Iufni. He bases this conclusion on the double names borne by these pharaohs, which he believes are filiative nomina, i.e. names referring to one's parents. Hence the Ameny in Ameny Qemau would indicate that he was the son of Amenemhat V, then succeeded by his own son Hotepibre Qemau Siharnedjheritef as shown by the Qemau in his name. Similarly "Ameny Antef Amenemhat (VI)" would be a triple name meaning "Amenemhat, son of Antef, son of Ameny" possibly because his father was a certain "King's son Antef" attested on scarab seals dated on stylistic ground to the 13th Dynasty and who would himself be a son of Amenemhat V. Amenemhat VI's predecessor Iufni would also be part of this family although his precise relation to the other members cannot be settled due to the lack of material dating to his very short reign.

Less than 10 years after Amenemhat VI's reign, a king named Renseneb Amenemhat took the throne. Following the same logic, he would be a son of a king Amenemhat who could possibly be Amenemhat VI or one of the intervening kings. Ryholt's analysis is contested by some Egyptologists as it relies on the unproven assumption that double names are necessarily filiative nomina.

== See also ==
- List of pharaohs

Preceded by Iufni	Pharaoh of Egypt; Thirteenth Dynasty	Succeeded by Semenkare Nebnuni
