= Seankhibtawy Seankhibra =

Egyptian pharaoh

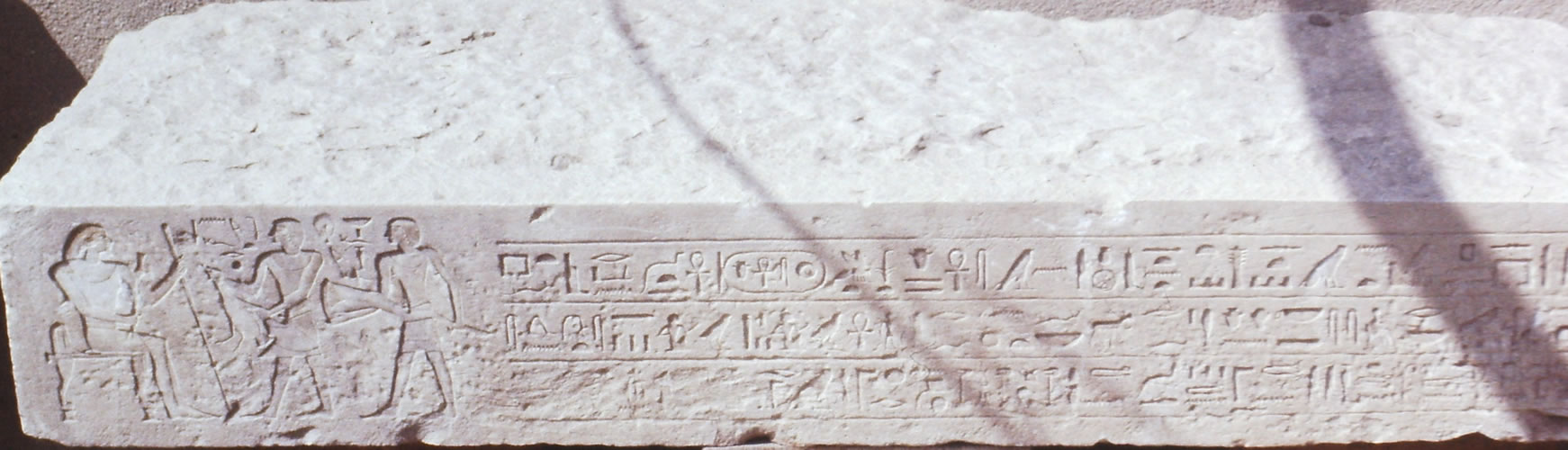
- Architrave with name of king Seankhibtawy Seankhibra

Pharaoh
- Reign: early 20th century BCE
Royal titulary
Horus name
Seankhibtawy
Sˁ-ˁnḫ-jb-t3wj
He who causes the heart of the Two Lands to live
G5	s anx ib tA tA
Prenomen
Seankhibra
Sˁ-ˁnḫ-jb-Rˁ
He who causes the heart of Ra to live

M23 X1 L2 X1	ra s anx ib
- Dynasty: 11th–13th Dynasty

Seankhibtawy Seankhibra was an Ancient Egyptian king of the 11th or more likely the 12th or 13th Dynasty of Egypt, during the Middle Kingdom period.

== Attestations ==
Seankhibtawy Seankhibra is only known from a single architrave found at Ayn Shams, the ancient city of Heliopolis, where it once adorned a private tomb. It is unclear whether Seankhibtawy Seankhibra is an otherwise unknown king or is rather a name variant for another, better known king of the 13th Dynasty.

== Identification ==
His identification causes problems in Egyptology, as there is no other king known with the same names, dating to the Middle Kingdom. The monument with the king's name has been dated beyond doubt to the Middle Kingdom on stylistically grounds. The name of the private person who owned the monument is damaged, but scant remains indicate that it might have been a person called Heny.

The titulary of ancient Egyptian kings consisted of five names, the prenomen and the nomen being the ones most commonly used on monuments. Yet another important name was the Horus name. Seankhibtawy Seankhibra appears on the monument with the Horus name Seankhibtawy and his prenomen Seankhibra. No other known king bears this combination of names. As of 2018, there is only one known king from the same historical period with the prenomen Seankhibra: pharaoh Amenemhat VI of the early 13th Dynasty. A second king with the same prenomen is attested in the Turin Canon as king of the slightly later 14th Dynasty, but he is not known from any contemporary attestations.

The architrave is of unknown provenance, it probably come from an undocumented rescue excavation. The first person who commented on the king was Detlef Franke who assigned the monument to Amenemhat VI. Kim Ryholt in his study of the Second Intermediate Period followed Franke's dating. The architrave was only fully published in 2005 by Mey Zaki who, again, follows this dating and identification. In contrast, the Egyptologist William Kelly Simpson has dated the monument to the late 11th Dynasty, a time which saw the reign of Mentuhotep IV, a poorly known pharaoh with few attestations. Nevertheless, other Egyptologists such as Alexander Ilin-Tomich, deem it more likely the monument dates to the 12th Dynasty on stylistic grounds, possibly to the early part of the Dynasty during the reigns Amenemhat I, Senusret I or Amenemhat II.

Therefore, Seankhibtawy Seankhibra is either an otherwise not yet attested short reigning king; or it is an early name of one of the mentioned kings before they changed name to the form better known from other monuments.
