= Nubhetepti-khered =

nbw Htp t p ti X r d
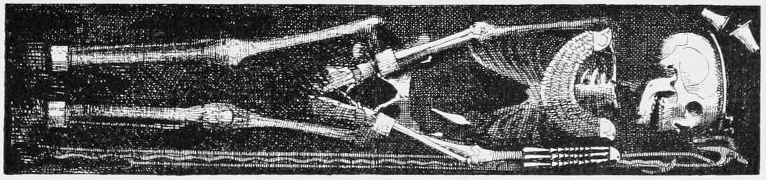
- Skeleton of Nubhetepti-khered, drawn by Georges Legrain
- Burial place: Giza, Egypt

Nubhetepti-khered was an ancient Egyptian king's daughter of the late 12th Dynasty or early 13th Dynasty in the late Middle Kingdom.

== Family ==
Most scholars think she was related to king Hor, who was buried next to her. Miroslav Verner believes that she was a daughter of Amenemhat III of the previous 12th Dynasty, who was the original owner of the whole funerary complex.

Since the khered part of the name means child, it is possible that her mother was called Nubhetepti, and indeed there is a Great Royal Wife from this period, who is called Nubhetepti on a few scarabs.

- Scenario 1: Nubhetepti-Khered was the daughter of Amenemhat III and buried in a shaft tomb next to his pyramid.
- Scenario 2: Nubhetepti-Khered was the daughter of Hor, and the two were buried next to each other reusing the shaft tombs next to the pyramid.

== Burial ==
=== Shaft tomb ===
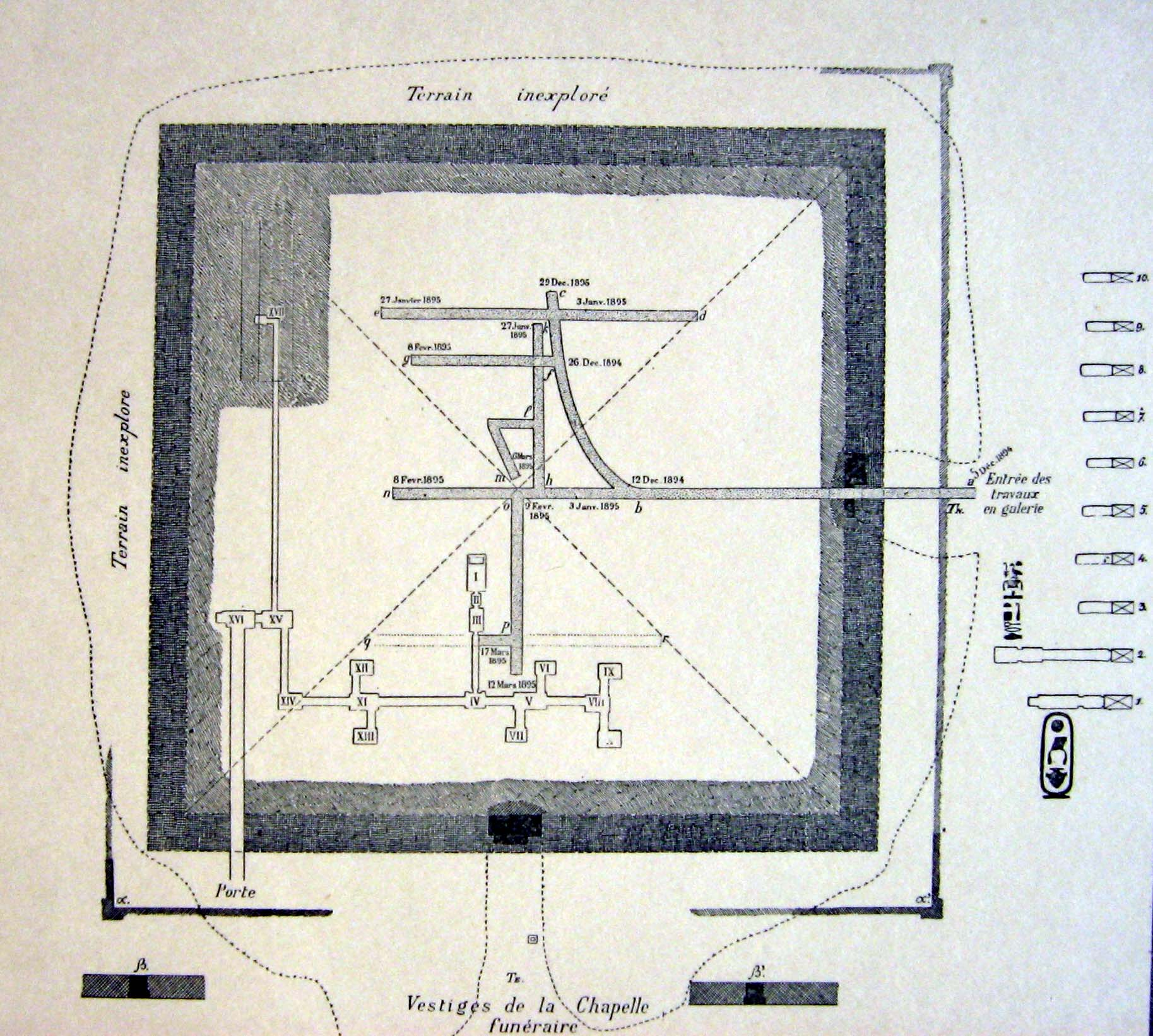
Pyramid complex of Amenemhat III; the tomb of Nubhetepti-khered is on the right labeled "2

At Dahshur, the undisturbed shaft tomb of Nubhotepti-khered was discovered in 1894 by Jacques Morgan, close to the Black Pyramid. North of the pyramid is a series of 10 shaft tombs for members of the royal family. While king Hor occupies tomb 1, Nubhotepti-Khered is buried in tomb 2. Her burial was found at the end of a long corridor. It consisted of two chambers, one above the other. The lower chamber contained the coffin and the canopic chest of the princess. In the upper chamber above the burial chamber were burial goods, including several pottery vessels. There was a box with ointment jars and a second, long box with further royal insignia. Nubhetepti-khered is so far not yet known outside her burial.

=== Wooden coffins and canopic chest ===
The body of Nubhetepti-khered was placed in a wooden coffin, decorated with inscribed gold leaf. In the coffin were found the remains of an inner, mummyform, gilded coffin. The wooden canopic chest was also adorned with gold leaf and contained four canopic jars made of alabaster.

=== Body ===
The body of Nubhetepti-khered was adorned with a broad collar and with armlets and anklets. Next to the body were found several royal insignia, such as a flail and a was scepter. The function of the weapons and royal insignia is uncertain. Mark Smith wonders whether they confer royal powers. Others observe that these objects are connected with Osiris and might identify the deceased with that god.According to the skeleton remains, Nubhetepti-khered was about 40 to 44 years old when she died. She was about 160 to 165 cm tall.

== Gallery ==
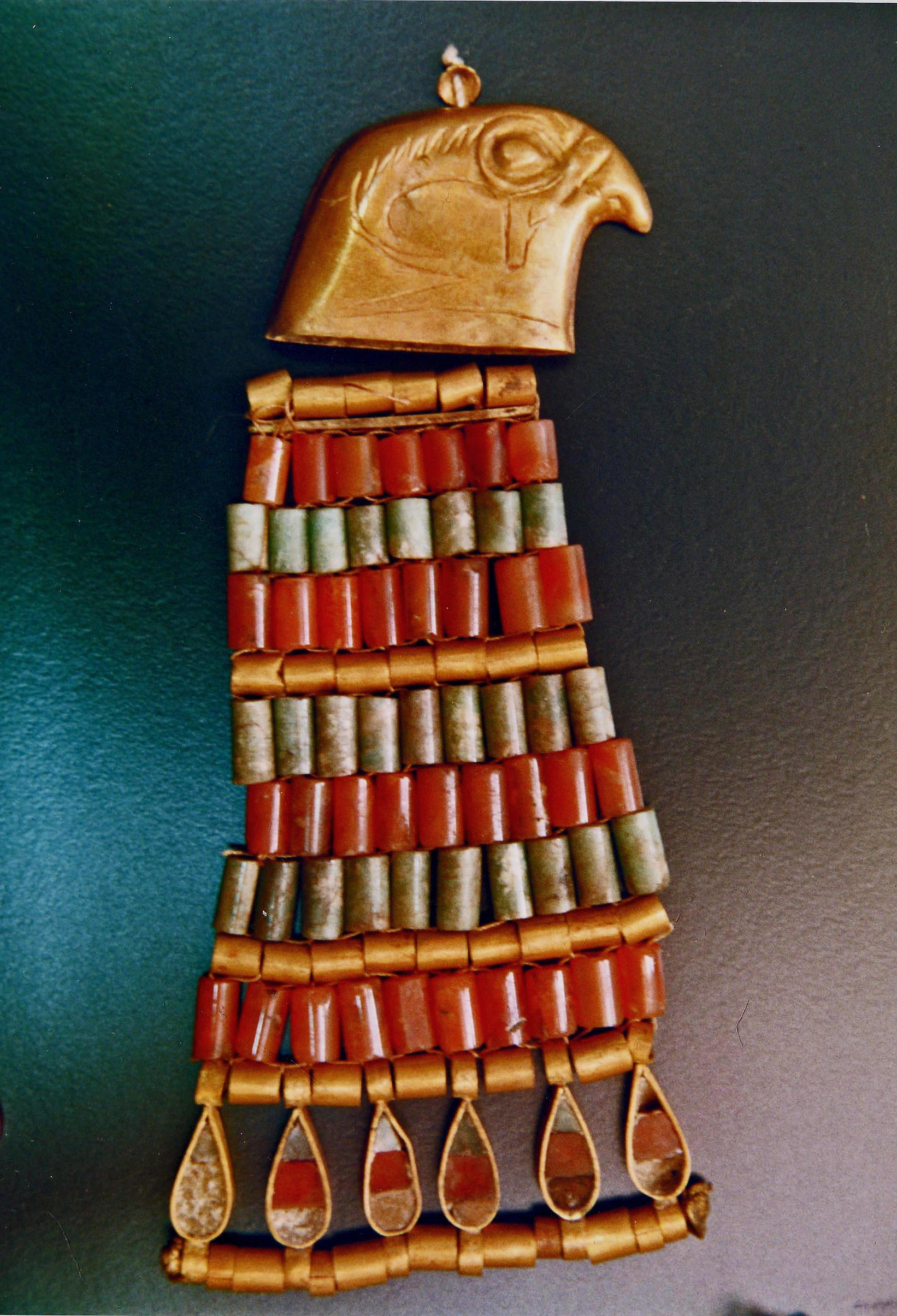
Counterpoise from her broad collar

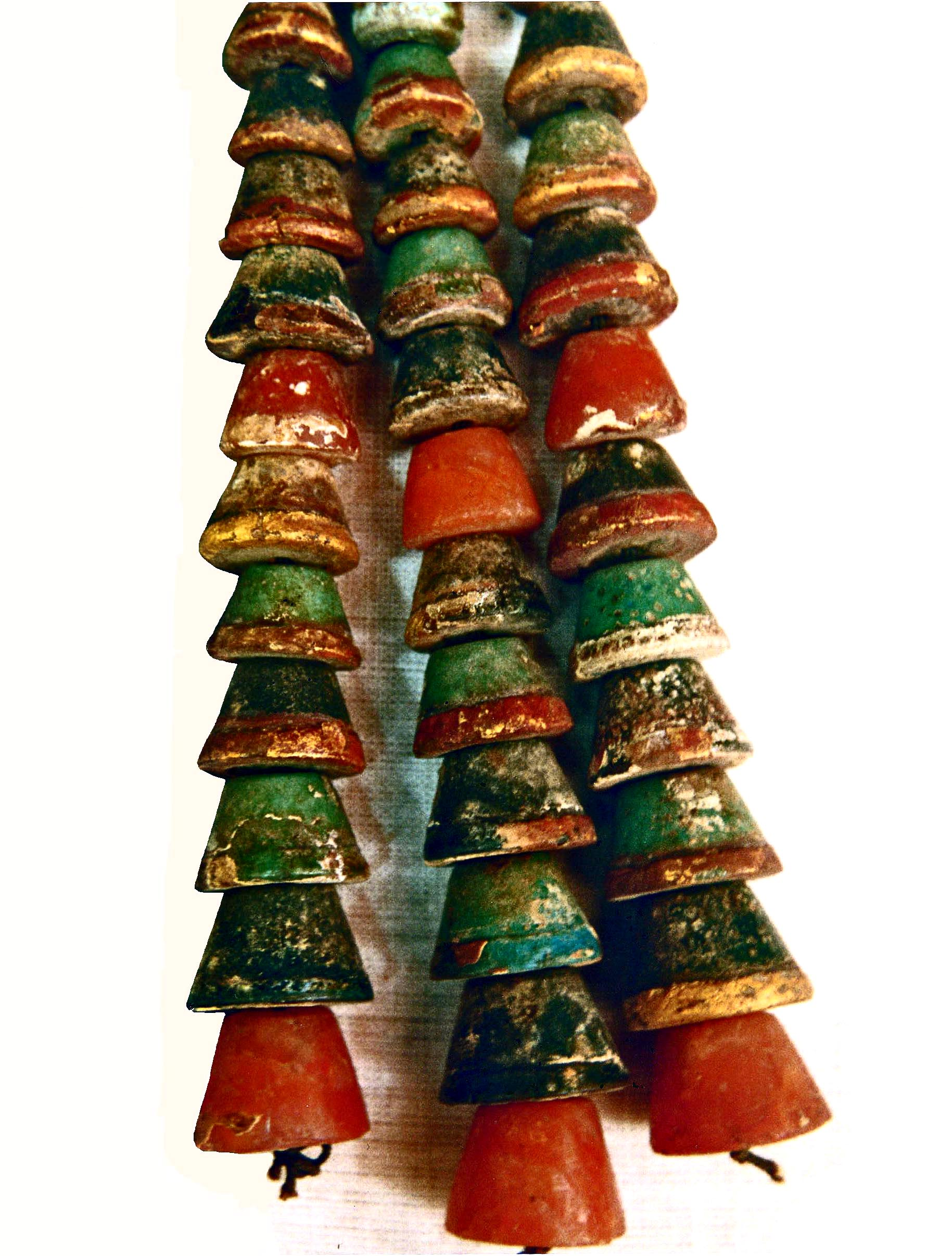
Flail

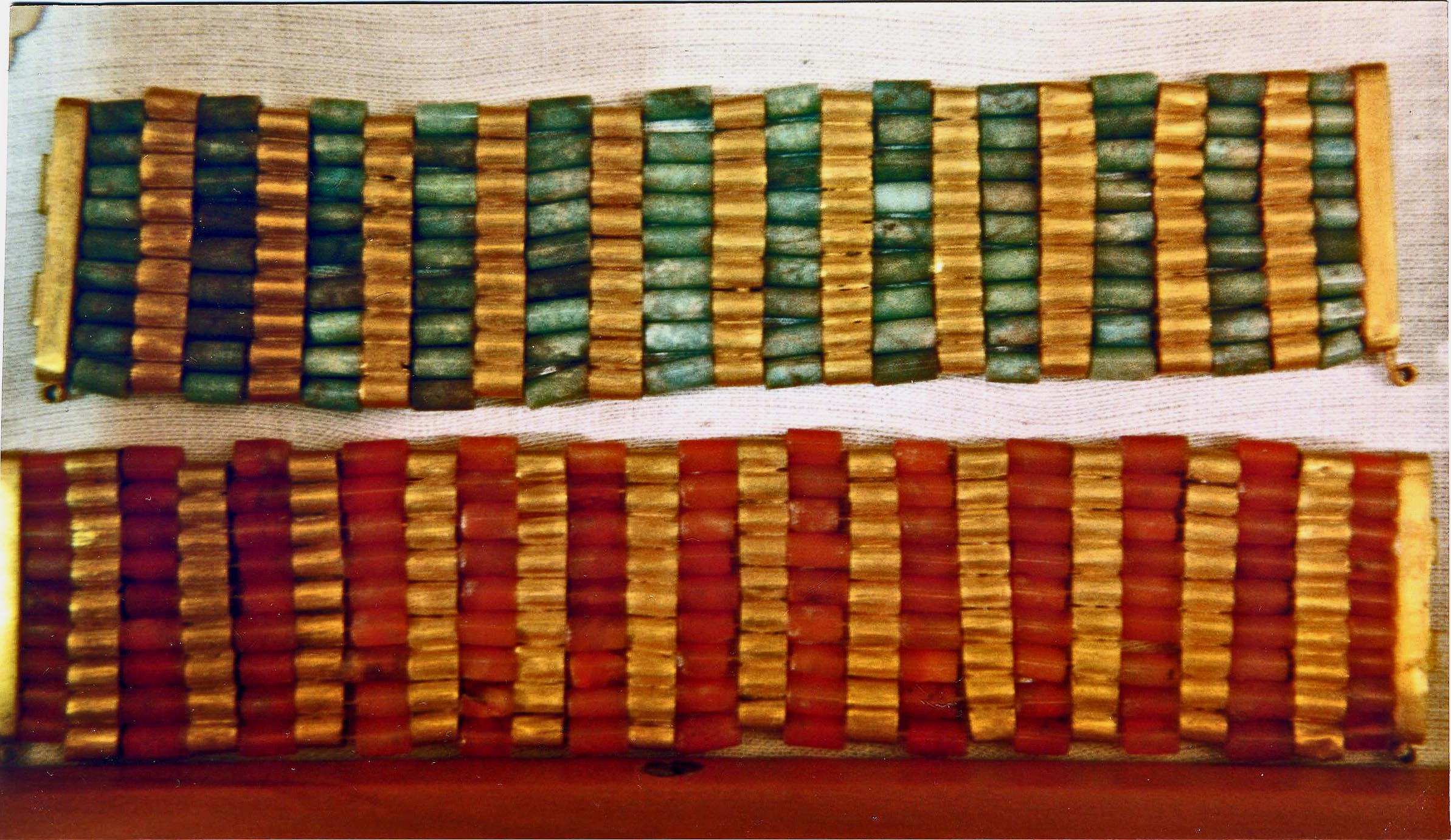
Armlets

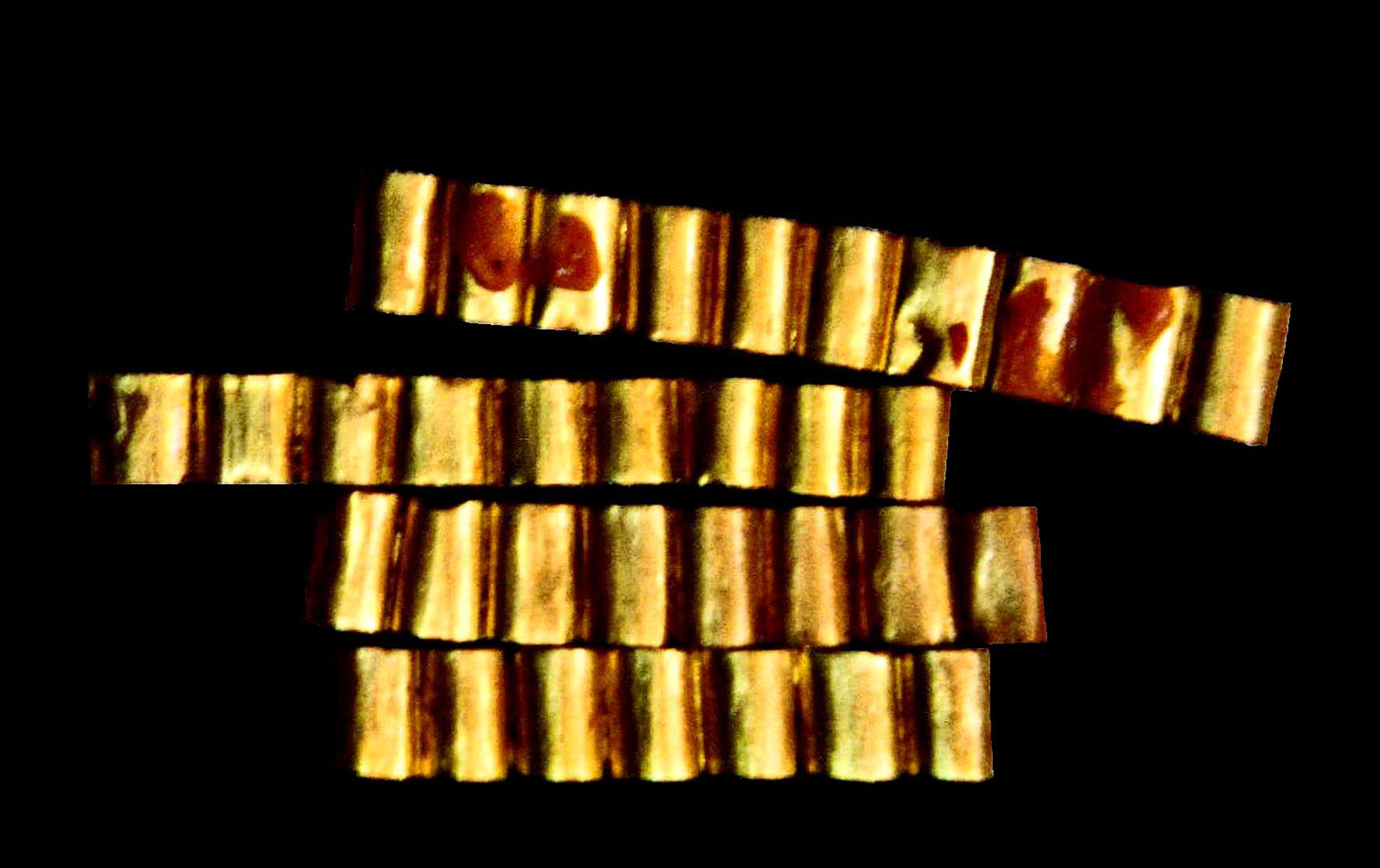
Gold beads

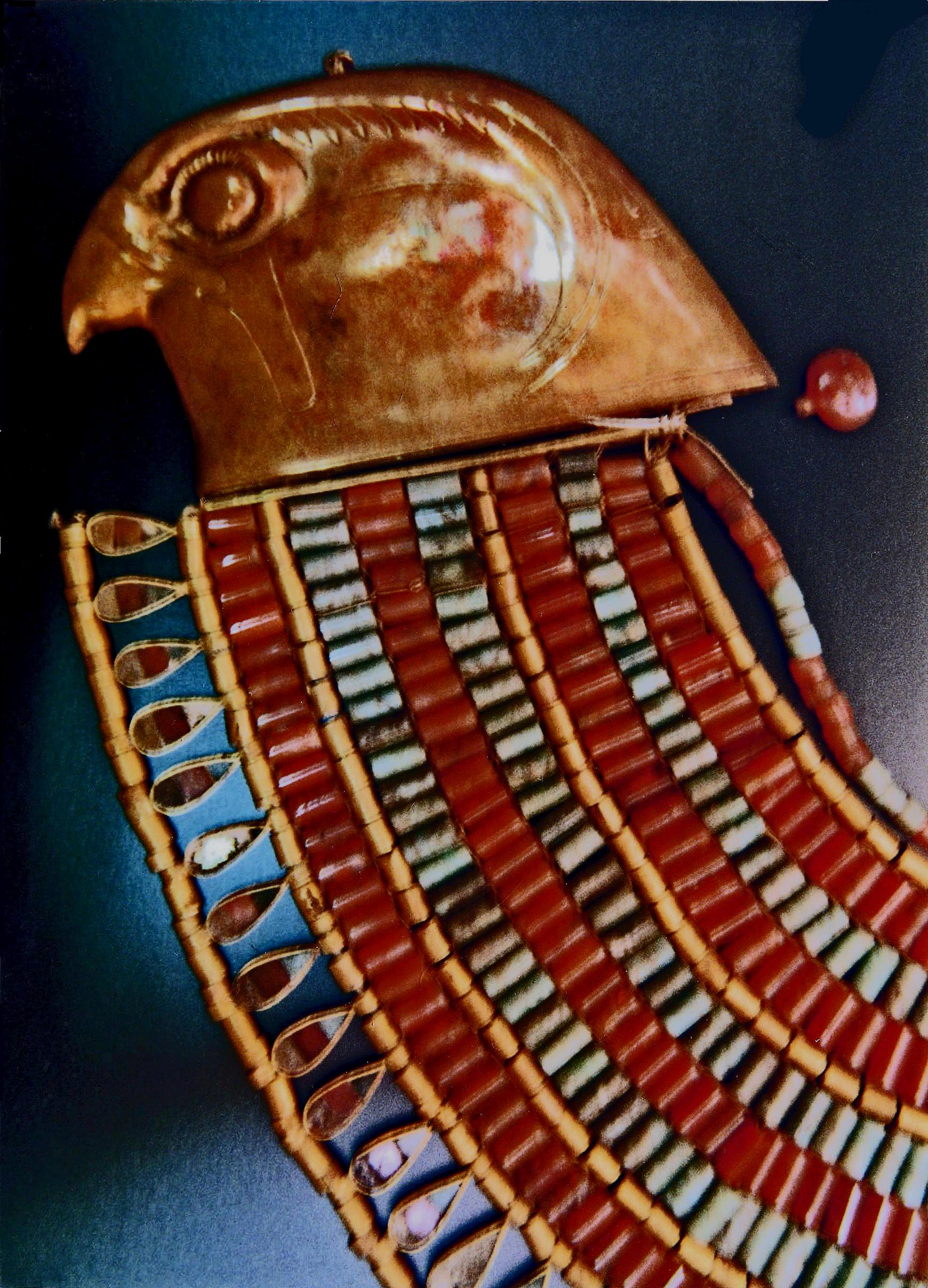
Broad collar
