= Sehetepibre =

Egyptian pharaoh

Sehetepibre Sewesekhtawy
- Sehotepibre Seusekhtowy, Seweskhtowy
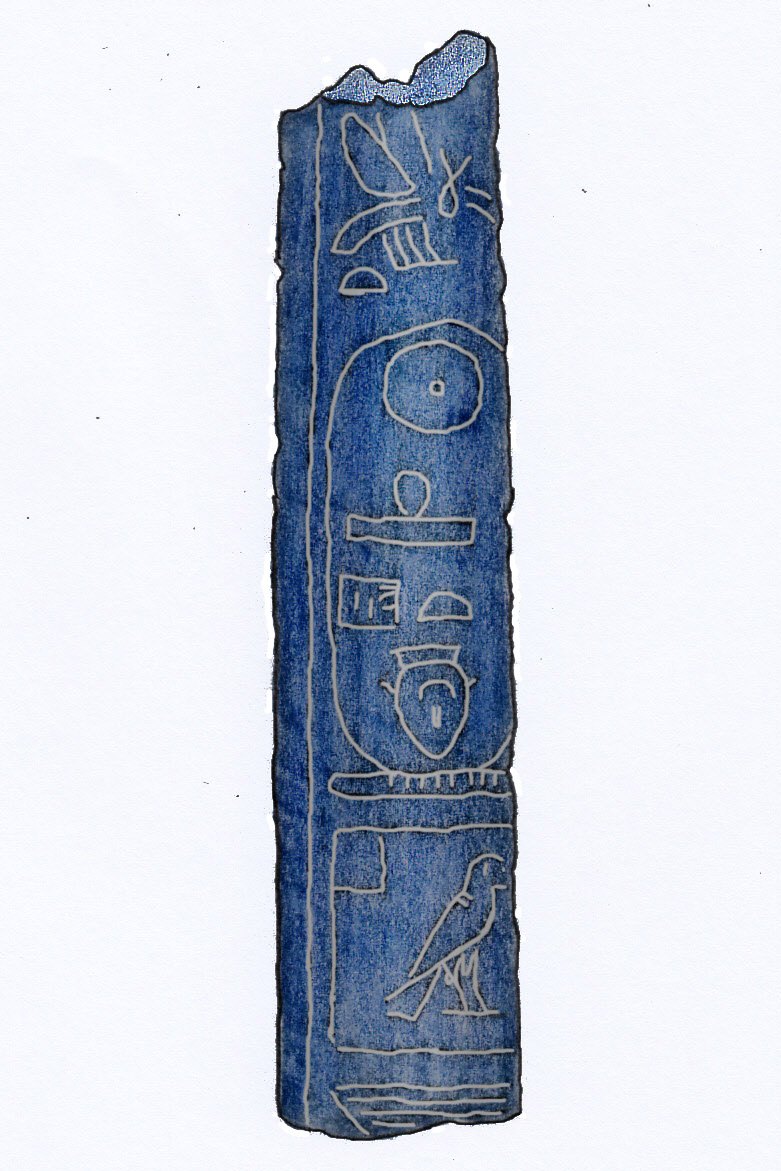
- Lapis lazuli cylinder seal with Sehetepibre's cartouche

Pharaoh
- Reign: 2 years, 1783 BC – 1781 BC
- Predecessor: Semenkare Nebnuni (Ryholt & Baker), Amenemhat V (von Beckerath & Franke)
- Successor: Sewadjkare (Ryholt & Baker), Iufni (von Beckerath & Franke)
Royal titulary
Horus name
Sewesekhtawy
Swsḫ-t3.w(j)
He who enlarges the two lands
G5	s w s x W10 tA tA
Prenomen
Sehetepibre
S.ḥtp-ib-Rˁ
He who satisfies the heart of Ra
M23 t L2 t < ra s Htp t p ib >
Turin canon:
Sehetepibre
S.ḥtp-ib-Rˁ
He who satisfies the heart of Ra
< N5 s R4 Q3 ib Z1 HASH > G7 HASH
- Dynasty: 13th Dynasty

Sehetepibre Sewesekhtawy (also Sehetepibre I or Sehetepibre II depending on the scholar) was an Egyptian pharaoh of the 13th Dynasty during the early Second Intermediate Period, possibly the fifth or tenth king of the Dynasty.

== Chronological position ==
The position of Sehetepibre Sewesekhtawy within the 13th Dynasty is not entirely clear. In the Turin canon, a king list redacted in the early Ramesside period, two kings are listed with the name "Sehetepibre", both in Column 7 (which mainly lists kings of the 13th Dynasty). The first "Sehetepibre" appears as the fourth king of the Dynasty, and the other as its eighth. Therefore, the exact chronological position of Sehetepibre Sewesekhtawy cannot be ascertained using only the Turin canon. According to the Egyptologists Kim Ryholt and Darrell Baker, Sehetepibre Sewesekhtawy was in fact the tenth king of the Dynasty, reigning for two years from 1783 BC until 1781 BC. They believe that the first "Sehetepibre" is an error resulting from the corruption of the name of Hotepibre Qemau Siharnedjheritef. They further propose that the author of the list did not include two kings, Nerikare and Ameny Qemau, thereby artificially making Sehetepibre Sewesekhtawy the eighth king when he was the tenth. On the other hand, Detlef Franke and Jürgen von Beckerath see Sehetepibre Sewesekhtawy as the first "Sehetepibre" listed in the Turin canon and thus as fifth king of the Dynasty. Franke and von Beckerath both identify the second "Sehetepibre" with Hotepibre Qemau Siharnedjheritef.

== Attestations ==
For a long time, Sehetepibre was known only from the Turin canon and from a single lapis lazuli cylinder seal. The seal, of unknown provenance, was bought by a private collector in Cairo and finally sold in 1926 to the Metropolitan Museum of Art, where it is now on display. The seal bears Sehetepibre's prenomen and is dedicated to "Hathor, Lady of [Byblos]". The seal is further inscribed with the name in cuneiform of a governor of Byblos named Yakin-Ilu. The archaeologist William F. Albright has tentatively identified Yakin-Ilu with a governor Yakin, attested on a stele discovered in Byblos and depicting his son, Yantinu, seated on a throne next to Neferhotep I's cartouches. If Albright's hypothesis is correct, then Sehetepibre would be one generation removed from Neferhotep I.

=== Gebel Zeit ===
The principal contemporary attestation of Sehetepibre is a stela published in 1980 and discovered earlier at Gebel Zeit, by the Red Sea, where galena mines were located. The stela bears the name of a king Sehetepibre together with the Horus name Sewesekhtawy. This stela, contemporary with his reign, further confirms the existence of this king. Maree (2009) points out that the stela shows his prenomen was Sewadjenre, and that there was two kings with this prenomen, the name Sehotepibre being used as a nomen in this case. Note that his predecessor also is attested at Gebel el-Zeit with a stela.

=== Lisht ===
In addition, two scarab-seals found in debris from the north pyramid cemetery at el-Lisht bear the name Sehetepibre, written without a cartouche or royal title. A virtually identical scarab was also found at Tell el-ʿAjjul in a Middle Bronze Age context (paralleling the Second Intermediate Period in Egypt). Whether these refer to the same individual is not certain.

Preceded by Semenkare Nebnuni	Pharaoh of Egypt; Thirteenth Dynasty	Succeeded by Sewadjkare
