= Yantin-'Ammu =

Middle Bronze Age ruler

Yantin-'Ammu Intin, Yantin, Yantinu
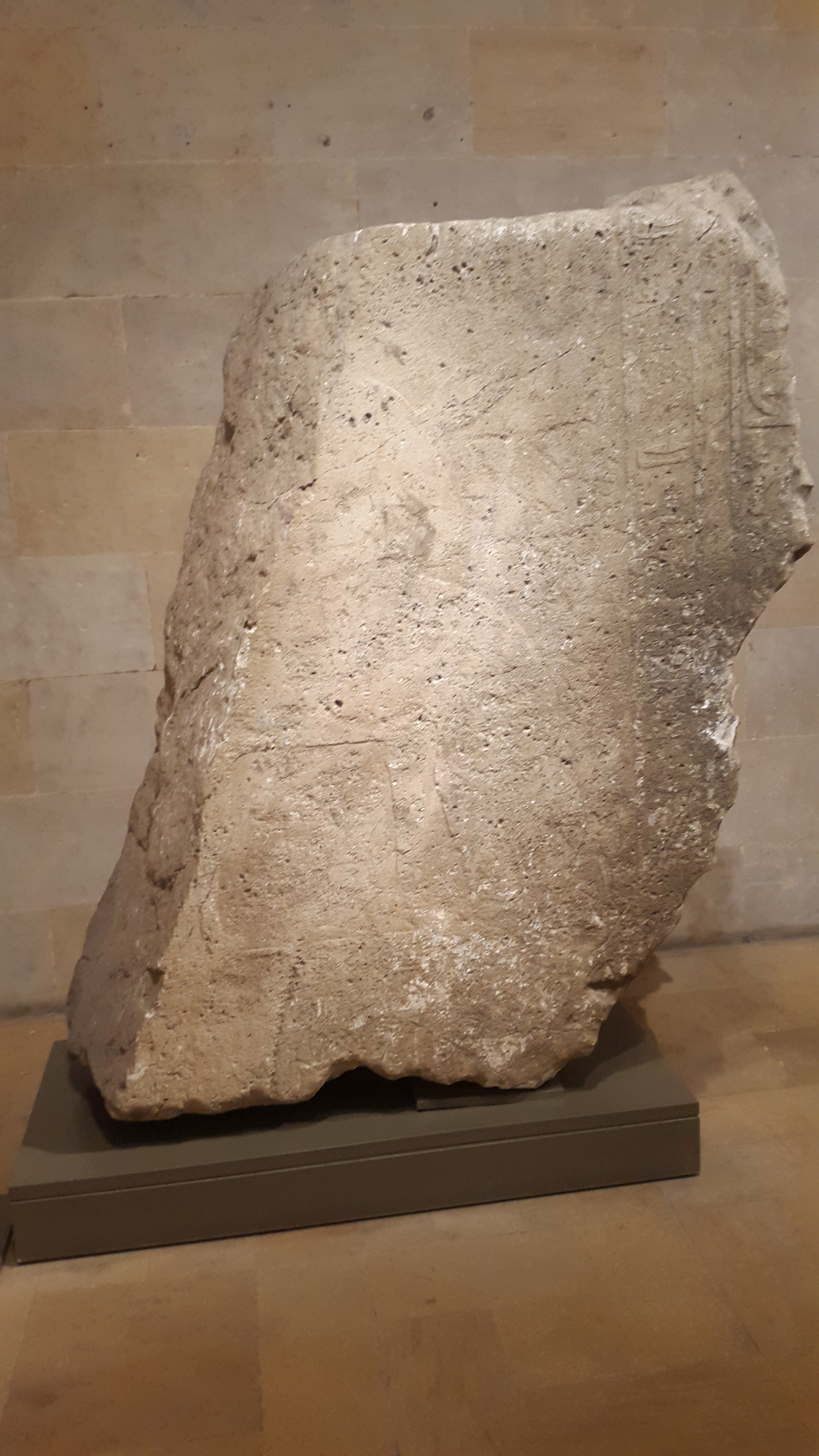
- Relief showing Intin seated in front of Neferhotep I's cartouche. Beirut National Museum.
- Reign: 18th-century BCE
- Predecessor: possibly Yakin
- Father: Yakin

Yantin-'Ammu was a local ruler of the Levantine town Byblos in the Middle Bronze Age, circa 18th century BCE. He is known from a cuneiform text in the Syrian city of Mari. The cuneiform texts from Mari are mostly datable to the reign of King Zimri-Lim, a contemporary of the Babylonian king Hammurabi.

== Intin/Yantin/Yantinu (Egyptian governor) ==
The ruler known from this text is speculated to be identical with a governor of Byblos named Intin (sometimes rendered Yantin or Yantinu, both likely hypocorisms of "Yantin-'Ammu", as once suggested by William F. Albright), who appears in several Egyptian texts found at Byblos.

Intin is depicted on a relief – now exhibited at the Beirut National Museum – while sitting in front of the cartouche of pharaoh Neferhotep I (13th Dynasty of Egypt); this situation suggests that both rulers were contemporary, with Intin being at least formally a vassal of Neferhotep. On the monument, it is said that Intin "was begotten by Governor Yakin," meaning that he was the son of this earlier governor. Intin is furthermore known from several scarab seals in fully Egyptian style. It is speculated that the latter was the same person mentioned as Yakin-Ilu on a lapis lazuli cylinder seal belonged to one of Neferhotep's predecessors, pharaoh Sehetepibre Sewesekhtawy.

Martin 263 | At Latakia (Crete), an ivory scarab seal mentioning Haty-aa of Byblos, Yantin (ḥꜣtj-ꜥ n kbnj jntn).
