= Gebel Zeit =

Ancient mining area in Egypt

Coordinates: 27°55′50″N 33°30′45″E

Gebel Zeit (Gebel el-Zeit) is an ancient mining area in Egypt located on the Red Sea coast, south of Ras Gharib. The mountain massif contains mineral resources. During the Egyptian Middle Kingdom and New Kingdom several expeditions went from Coptos to Gebel Zeit.

== History ==
Gebel Zeit is known for its mineral deposits including bitumen (waterproofing, adhesive) and galena. There were two mining sites. One of the sites had a sanctuary with figurines for Min, Horus, Ptah and Hathor.

=== Middle Bronze Age ===
==== Middle Kingdom ====
In the late Middle Kingdom, Amenemhat III sent expeditions to mine galena.

==== Second Intermediate Period ====
In the Second Intermediate Period, expeditions to the galena mine is known during the reigns of Nebnun, Sehotepibre, and Bebiankh and later under Governor Minemhat of Coptos.

=== Late Bronze Age ===
==== New Kingdom ====
In the New Kingdom expeditions continued under several rulers, with activity under Amenhotep III and the latest securely date during the reign of Ramesses II.
