= Sewadjkare =

Egyptian pharaoh

- Sewadjkare I

Pharaoh
- Reign: very short reign c. 1781 BC (Ryholt) or c. 1737 BC (Schneider)
- Predecessor: Sehetepibre (Ryholt & Baker), Siharnedjheritef Hotepibre (von Beckerath & Franke)
- Successor: Nedjemibre
Royal titulary
Praenomen
Sewadjkare
S.w3ḏ-k3-Rˁ
He whom the Ka or Ra causes to flourishM23 t L2 t < ra s wAD kA HASH >
- Dynasty: 13th Dynasty

Sewadjkare (more exactly Sewadjkare I) was an Egyptian pharaoh of the 13th Dynasty during the early Second Intermediate Period.

According to Egyptologists Kim Ryholt and Darrell Baker he was the eleventh ruler of the dynasty, reigning for a short time c. 1781 BC. Alternatively, Thomas Schneider, Detlef Franke and Jürgen von Beckerath see him as the tenth king of the 13th Dynasty, with Schneider placing his reign at c. 1737 BC.

== Evidence ==
No contemporary attestation of Sewadjkare survives to this day and this pharaoh is only known to us thanks to the Turin canon. This king list was redacted during the early Ramesside period from older documents and serves as the primary source for kings of the Second Intermediate Period. Sewadjkare's name appears on the 7th column, 13th line of the papyrus.

== Reign length ==
The Turin canon normally gives the reign length of the kings it lists; however, the duration of Sewadjkare's reign is lost in a lacuna. Only the number of days is partially preserved and was read by Ryholt as eleven to fourteen days. The space apparently taken by the total duration of the reign as recorded on the Turin canon led Ryholt to propose a minimum reign length of half a month. Given the total absence of contemporary attestation for Sewadjkare, it seems likely that he was an ephemeral ruler.

== Identity ==
Sewadjkare should not be confused with two other pharaohs bearing the same prenomen, and who reigned later in the Second Intermediate Period. Sewadjkare Hori II, also known as Hori II, reigned at the very end of the 13th Dynasty, from c. 1669 until 1664 BC. The other ruler with the same prenomen is Sewadjkare III of the 14th Dynasty, who is also known only thanks to the Turin canon. Sewadjkare III reigned for a short while, some time between c. 1699 and 1694 BC.

Preceded by Sehetepibre	Pharaoh of Egypt; Thirteenth Dynasty	Succeeded by Nedjemibre
