= Hor Awibre =

Egyptian pharaoh

- Hor, Awibre, Auibre
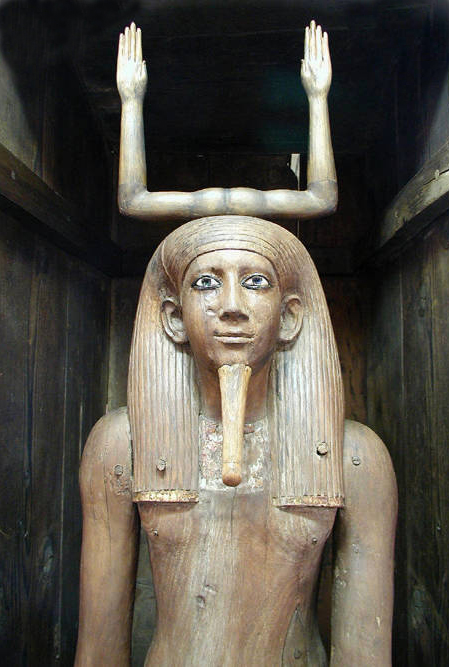
- Ka statue of the pharaoh Awibre Hor, on display at the Egyptian Museum, Cairo

Pharaoh
- Reign: 2 years? 1777–1775 BC (Ryholt) a few months (Baker); 7 months c. 1760 BC (Verner); 1732 BC (Schneider)
- Predecessor: Renseneb
- Successor: Sekhemrekhutawy Khabaw
Royal titulary
Horus name
Hotepibtawy
Ḥtp-jb-t3wj
He who satisfies the heart of the two Lands
G5	Htp ib N19
Nebty name
Neferkhaw
Nfr-ḫˁw
He whose apparitions are perfect
G16	nfr xa a w Y1 Z2
Golden Horus
Nefer-netjeru
Nfr-nṯrw
Most perfect of the gods
G8 nfr R8 R8 R8
Prenomen
Awibre
3w-jb-Rˁ
The friend of Ra
M23 t L2 t < N5 F40 F34 >
Turin King List
Awtibre
3wt-jb-Rˁ
< ra Aw Z7 t Y1 Z2 ib Z1 >
Nomen
Hor
Ḥr.(w)
HorusG39 N5 < G5 >
Variant:
Hori
Ḥr.(w)j
Man of Horus/Follower of Horus
G39 N5 < G5 i >
- Consort: Nubhetepti I
- Children: Nubhetepti-khered, possibly Sekhemrekhutawy Khabaw and Djedkheperew
- Died: (40s yrs)
- Burial: Dahshur, reused shaft tomb in the pyramid complex of Amenemhat III.
- Dynasty: 13th Dynasty

Hor Awibre (also known as Hor I) was an Egyptian pharaoh of the early 13th Dynasty, in the late Middle Kingdom.

== Reign ==
Hor Awibre had a short reign only partially preserved in the Turin King List, and may have had a coregency with Sekhemre Khutawy Khabaw, with both names on the architrave. He may have become king at an advanced age; his skeleton is thought to indicate a man in his forties.

=== Reign length ===
Hor Awibre's reign length is partially lost to a lacuna of the Turin canon and is consequently unknown. According to the latest reading of the Turin canon by Ryholt, the surviving traces indicate the number of days as "[... and] 7 days". In the previous authoritative reading of the canon by Alan Gardiner, which dates to the 1950s, this was read as "[...] 7 months". This led scholars such as Miroslav Verner and Darrell Baker to believe that Hor Awibre's reign was ephemeral, while Ryholt's reading leaves a longer reign possible and indeed Ryholt credits Hor Awibre with 2 years of reign. In any case, Hor Awibre most likely reigned only for a short time, and not long enough to prepare a pyramid, which was still the common burial place for kings of the early 13th dynasty.

=== Succession ===
Hor Awibre was seemingly succeeded by his two sons(?) Sekhemrekhutawy Khabaw and Djedkheperew. However, the Turin King List has Sedjefakare as the next ruler.

== Attestations ==
Hor Awibre remained unattested until the discovery in 1894 of his nearly intact tomb in Dashur by Jacques de Morgan, see below.

=== Architecture ===
==== Tanis/Memphis, Architrave ====
At Tanis (Nile Delta region), in a secondary context, a granite architrave with the cartouches of Hor Awibre and Sekhemre Khutawy Khabaw was found. The architrave probably originated in Memphis and came to the Delta region during the Hyksos period. Based on this evidence, the egyptologist Kim Ryholt proposed that Sekhemrekhutawy Khabaw was a son and coregent of Hor Awibre. Present location of this architrave is unknown.

=== Plaque, Berlin 7670 ===
A plaque has been found, of unknown provenance.

=== Lisht, plaque ===
At Lisht, a plaque with his name was found at Amenemhat I's pyramid. There were found several faience plaques with 13th Dynasty kings' names.

=== Jar Lid, LACMA M.80.203.226 ===
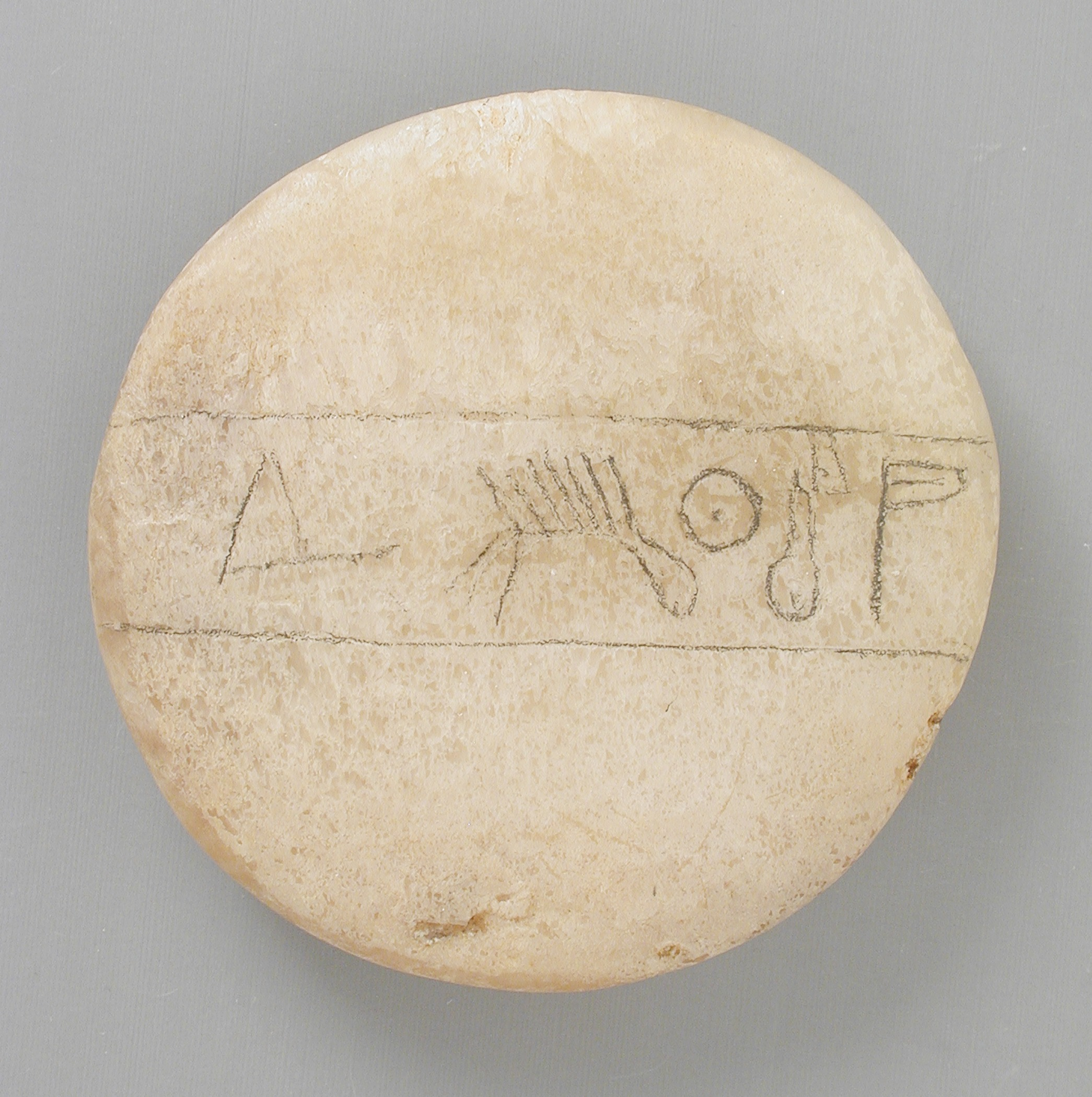
Jar lid with the prenomen Awibre, LACMA.

A jar lid with partial name of the 13th Dynasty King Hor I, of unknown provenance.

=== Scarabs ===
The British Museum has several scarabs which may be attributed to Hor Awibre.

- EA 37652 (Hall 1913 no. 137)
- EA 28813 (Hall 1913 no. 138)
- EA 39430 (Hall 1913 no. 139)
- EA 39690 (Hall 1913 no. 140)

== Non-contemporary attestation ==
The Turin King List entry 7:17 lists "The Dual King Awtibra ... 7 days". In this list, Hor Awibre is preceded by Renseneb (7:16) and succeeded by Sedjefakare (7:18).

== Burial ==
=== Shaft Tomb ===
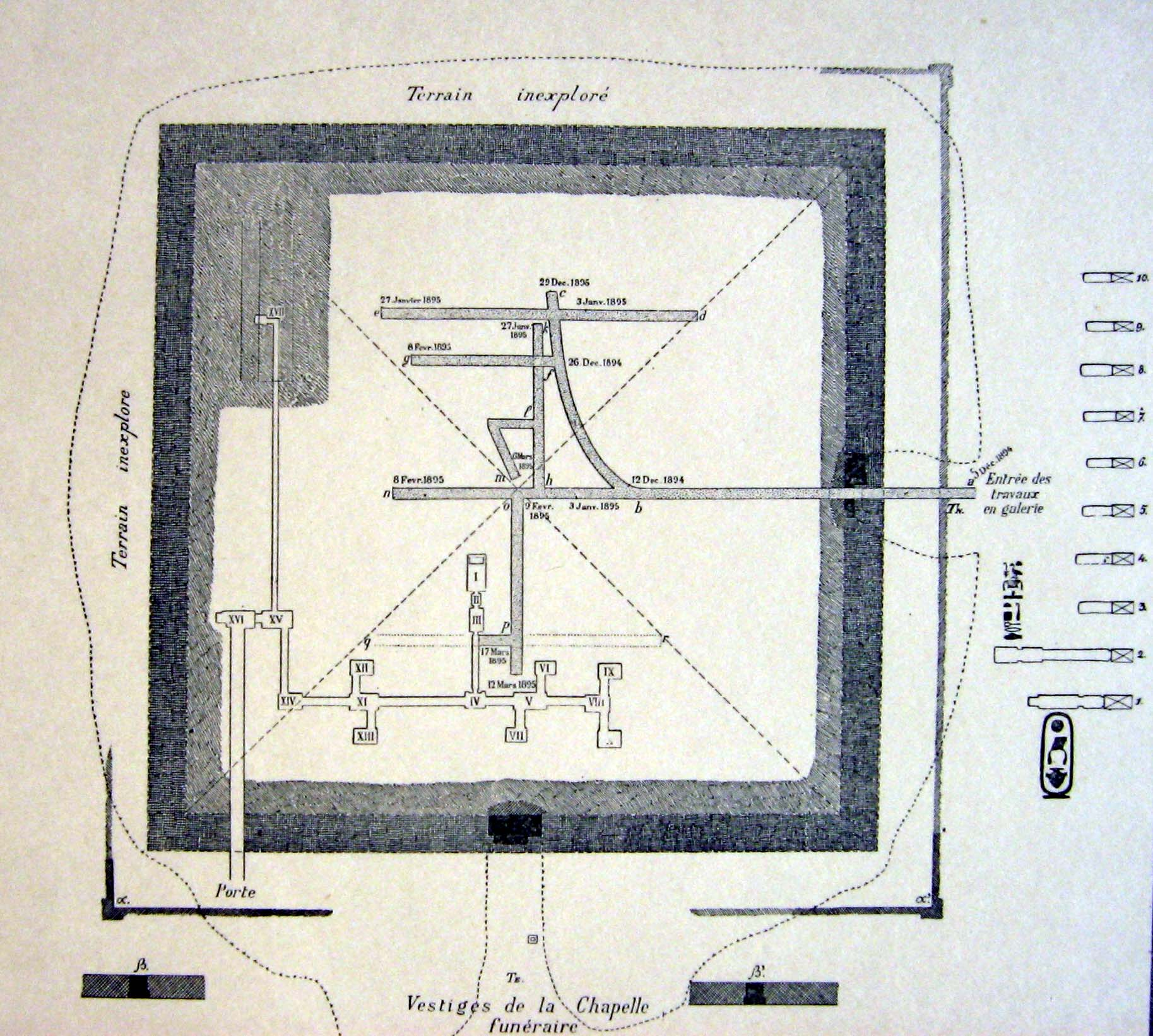
Shaft Tomb of Hor Awibre (no. 1) north of the Pyramid of Amenemhat III

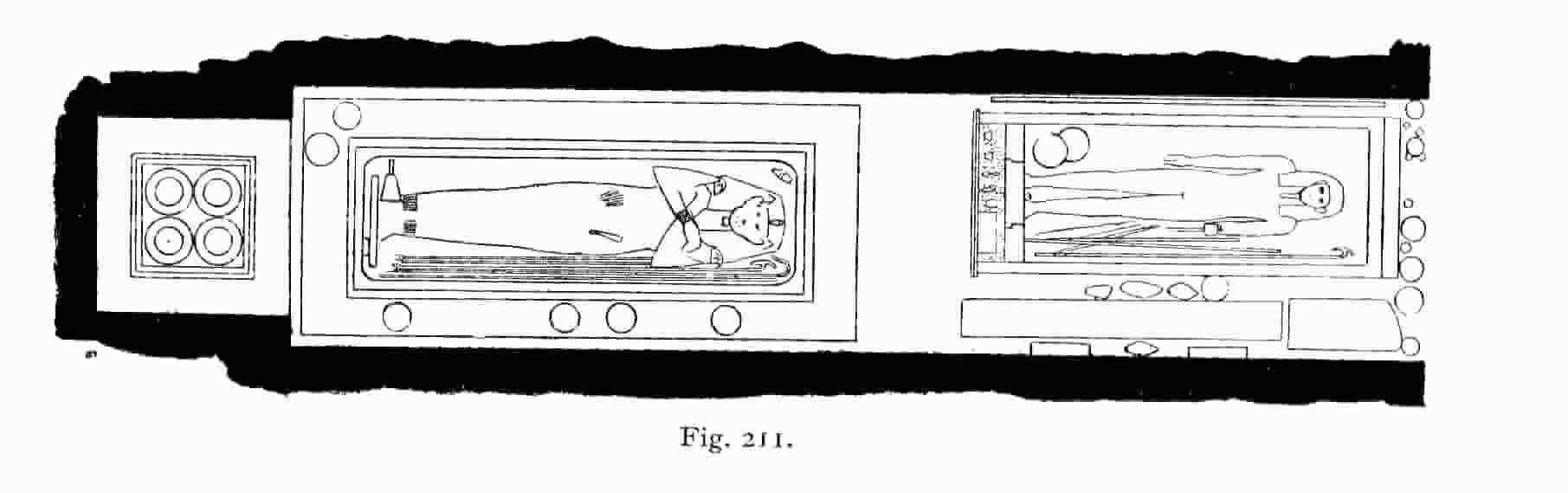
Plan of the tomb of king Hor Awibre

At Dahshur, the shaft tomb of Hor Awibre is located inside the Pyramid Complex of Amenemhat III, reusing and expanding a shaft tomb originally made for a member of the royal court of Amenemhat III. Ten such shaft tombs were located north of the pyramid, where Hor Awibre occupies the first and Nubhotepti-Khered the second. His tomb was found nearly intact in 1894 by Jacques de Morgan working in collaboration with Georges Legrain and Gustave Jequier. It was nothing more than a shaft built on the north-east corner of the pyramid of the 12th Dynasty pharaoh Amenemhat III. The tomb was originally made for a member of Amenemhat's court and was later enlarged for Hor Awibre, with the addition of a stone burial chamber and antechamber.

Next to the burial of Hor Awibre was found the totally undisturbed tomb of the 'king's daughter' Nubhetepti-khered. She was likely a daughter of Hor Awibre or otherwise a daughter of Amenemhat III.

=== Mummy ===
Funerary mask of Hor Awibre

The mummy of the king had been ransacked for his jewellery and only Hor Awibre's skeleton was left in his coffin. The king was determined to have been in his forties at the time of his death. He was found with his arms across his chest.

=== Burial Equipment ===
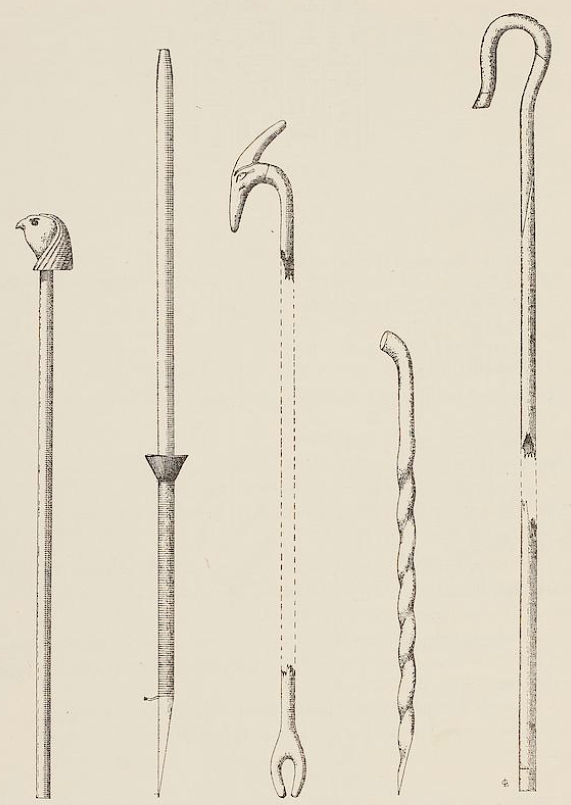
Drawing by Jacques de Morgan of the sceptres and staves of Hor Awibre.

Burial goods include a canopic chest, canopic jars, gold-leaf, and a ka-statuette. His burial goods show a special type of hieroglyphs known as "incomplete hieroglyphs", which developed in the reign of Amenemhat III onwards (i.e. burial equipment of Nefruptah), where parts of animal hieroglyphs have been ritually 'mutilated' removing their legs etc.

Although the tomb had been pillaged in antiquity, it still contained a naos with a rare life-size wooden statue of the Ka of the king. This statue is one of the most frequently reproduced examples of Ancient Egyptian art and is now in the Egyptian Museum under the catalogue number CG259. It is one of the best-preserved and most accomplished wooden statues to survive from antiquity, and illustrates an artistic genre that must once have been common in Egyptian art, but has rarely survived in such good condition.

The tomb also contained the partly gilded rotten rectangular wooden coffin of the king. The king's wooden funerary mask, its eyes of stones set in bronze, had been stripped of its gold gilding but still held the king's skull. Hor Awibre's canopic box was also found complete with its canopic vessels.

Other artifacts from the tomb include an offering table, small statues, alabaster and wooden vases, some jewellery, two alabaster stelae inscribed with blue painted hieroglyphs and a number of flails, sceptres and wooden staves which had all been disposed in a long wooden case. These had been intentionally broken in pieces. The tomb also housed weapons such as a granite macehead and a golden-leaf dagger and numerous items of pottery.

== Theories ==
According to Ryholt and Darrell Baker, Hor Awibre was the fifteenth ruler of the 13th Dynasty. Alternatively, Detlef Franke and Jürgen von Beckerath see him as the fourteenth king of the dynasty. No evidence has been found that relates Hor Awibre to his predecessor on the throne, Renseneb, which led Ryholt and Baker to propose that he was an usurper.

Some Egyptologists speculate his reign was from c. 1777 BC until 1775 BC or for a few months, c. 1760 BC or c. 1732 BC.

== Bibliography ==
- Sydney H Aufrère (2001) BIFAO 101, pp. 1–41
- Hall 1913 / Catalogue of Egyptian scarabs, etc. in the British Museum no. 137, 138, 139, 140 https://archive.org/stream/catalogueofegypt00hall/catalogueofegypt00hall_djvu.txt

Preceded by Renseneb	Pharaoh of Egypt; Thirteenth Dynasty	Succeeded by Sekhemrekhutawy Khabaw
