= Pyramid of Ameny Qemau =

Egyptian pyramid

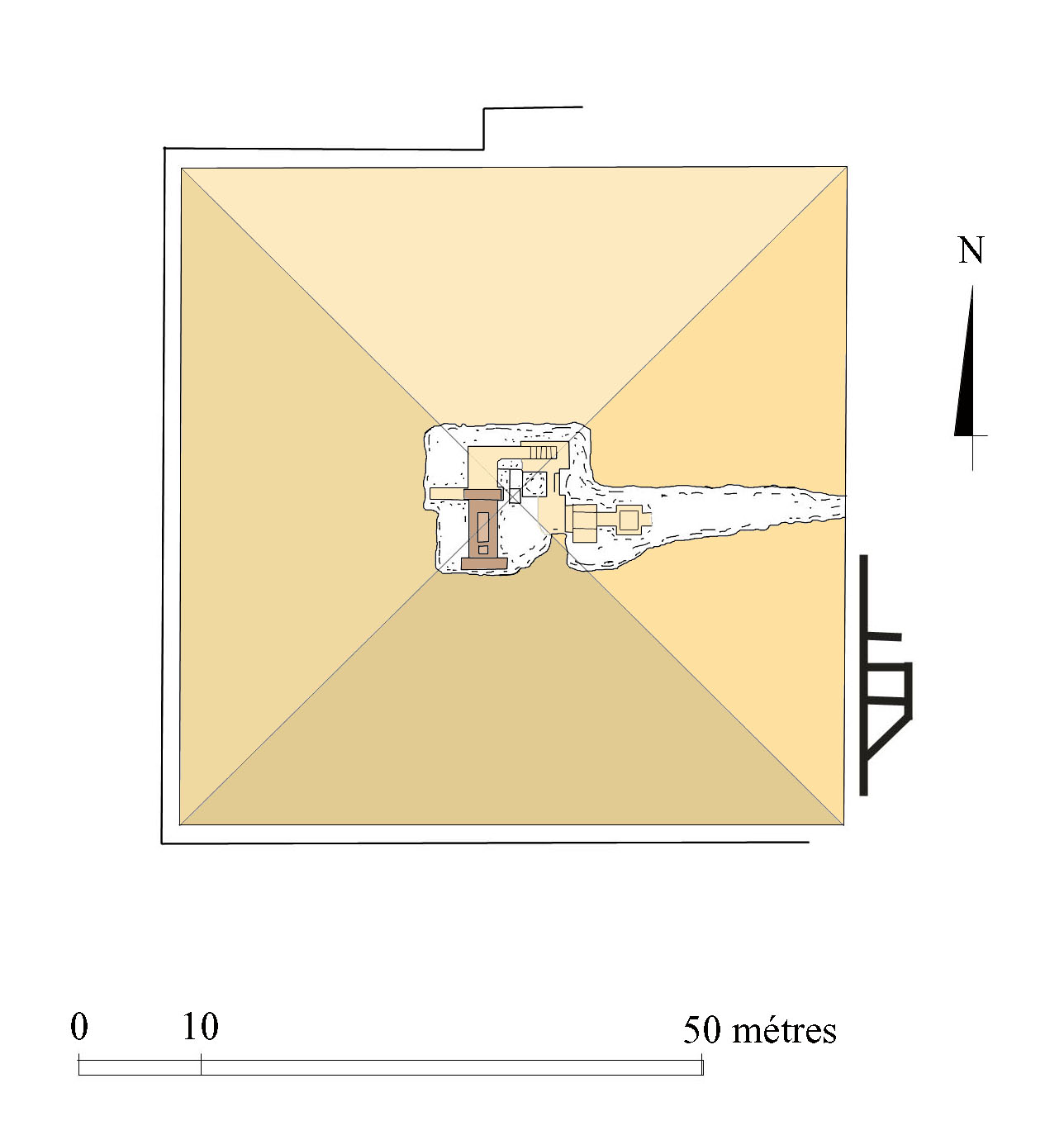
- Layout of substructures of the pyramid of Ameny Qemau in Dahshur South
- Interactive map of Pyramid of Ameny Qemau
- 29°46′54″N 31°13′17″E
- Owner: Ameny Qemau
- Constructed: c. 1790 BC
- Type: True pyramid, now ruined
- Height: 35 metres (115 ft)
- Base: 52 metres (171 ft)

The pyramid of Ameny Qemau is an ancient Egyptian pyramid located in southern Dahshur. It was constructed for Ameny Qemau, an obscure king of the 13th Dynasty during the Second Intermediate Period.

== Pyramid ==
The pyramid originally stood 35 metres (115 ft) high with a base length of 52 metres (171 ft). The entrance was towards the east. The stone constituting its upper structure has been entirely robbed but the damaged substructures remain.

The burial chamber comprised from a single colossal block of quartzite similar to that of Amenemhat III, with receptacles for the sarcophagus and the canopic jars hewn out of the interior of the block.

== Excavations ==
The earliest known historical mention of the pyramid of Ameny Qemau is found in the book of the medieval Arab historian Taqi al-Din Ahmad Al-Maqrizi "Geography and History of Egypt" where Al-Maqrizi describes the "pyramids of Dashur".

The pyramid of Ameny Qemau was rediscovered in 1957 by a team led by Charles Arthur Musès. In 1968, Vito Maragioglio and Celeste Rinaldi investigated the architecture of the pyramid. More recently, the remains of the funerary equipment of the king were published by Nabil Swelim and Aidan Dodson.

== See also ==
- Egyptian pyramid construction techniques
- List of Egyptian pyramids
- Lepsius list of pyramids
