= Semenkare Nebnuni =

Pharaoh of the Middle Kingdom of Egypt

- Nebnun, Nebnennu, Nebennu
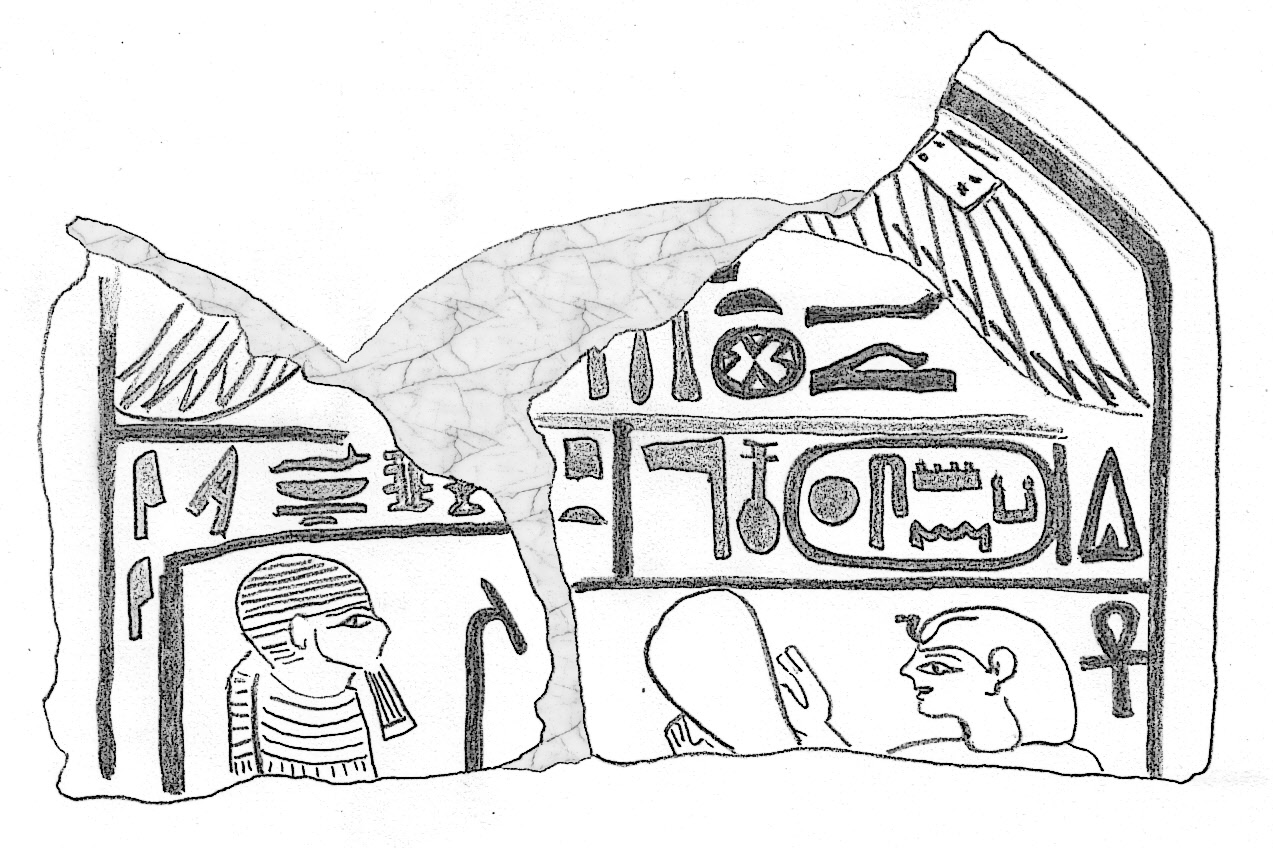
- Nebnuni (right) offering to Ptah (left) on a stele from Gebel el-Zeit

Pharaoh
- Reign: x years, x months, 22 days 1785-1783 BC (Ryholt); 1741 BC (Franke)
- Predecessor: Amenemhat VI (Ryholt)
- Successor: Sehetepibre
Royal titulary
Prenomen
Semenkare
S.mn-k3-Rˁ
He who establishes the Ka of Ra
M23 t L2 t < N5 s mn n D28 Z1 >
Nomen
Nebnuni
Nb.n-nw
Nu is my lord
G39 N5 < nb n Z2 nw n&w >
- Dynasty: 13th Dynasty

Semenkare Nebnuni (also Nebnun and Nebnennu) is a poorly attested pharaoh of the early 13th Dynasty during the Second Intermediate Period. He is mainly known for his position in the Turin King List.

== Family ==
Based on his lack of filiative nomen, Ryholt has suggested that he was of non-royal birth.

== Attestation ==
=== The Sinai ===
The only contemporary attestation of Nebnuni is a faience stele showing the king before Ptah "South of his wall", a memphite epithet of the god, and on the other before Horus, "Lord of the foreign countries". The stele is also inscribed with Nebnuni's nomen and prenomen. The stele was discovered at Gebel el-Zeit on the Red Sea coast in the Sinai, where mines of galena were located.

=== Non-contemporary attestation ===
The Turin canon 7:11 (Gardiner 6:11) mentions: "The Dual King Semenkara ... 22 days ...". He is preceded by 7:10 Sankhibra (Amenemhat) and succeeded by 7:12 Sehotepibra.

== Theories ==
According to Egyptologists Darrell Baker and Kim Ryholt, Nebnuni was the ninth ruler of the 13th Dynasty. Alternatively, Jürgen von Beckerath and Detlef Franke see him as the eighth king of the dynasty.

The Egyptologist Kim Ryholt credits Nebnuni with a reign of two years, from 1785 BC until 1783 BC. Alternatively, Egyptologists Rolf Krauss, Detlef Franke and Thomas Schneider give Nebuni only one year of reign in 1739 BC. Although little is known of Nebnuni's reign, the existence of his stele shows that during this period, rulers of the 13th Dynasty still wielded sufficient power to organize mining expeditions in the Sinai for the supply of construction materials and the production of luxury items. Finally, Ryholt points to the lack of royal connections between Nebnuni and his predecessor. He thus concludes that Nebnuni may have usurped the throne.

== See also ==
- List of pharaohs

Preceded by Amenemhat VI	Pharaoh of Egypt; Thirteenth Dynasty	Succeeded by Sehetepibre
