= Djedkheperew =

Egyptian pharaoh of the 13th Dynasty

- Djedkheperu
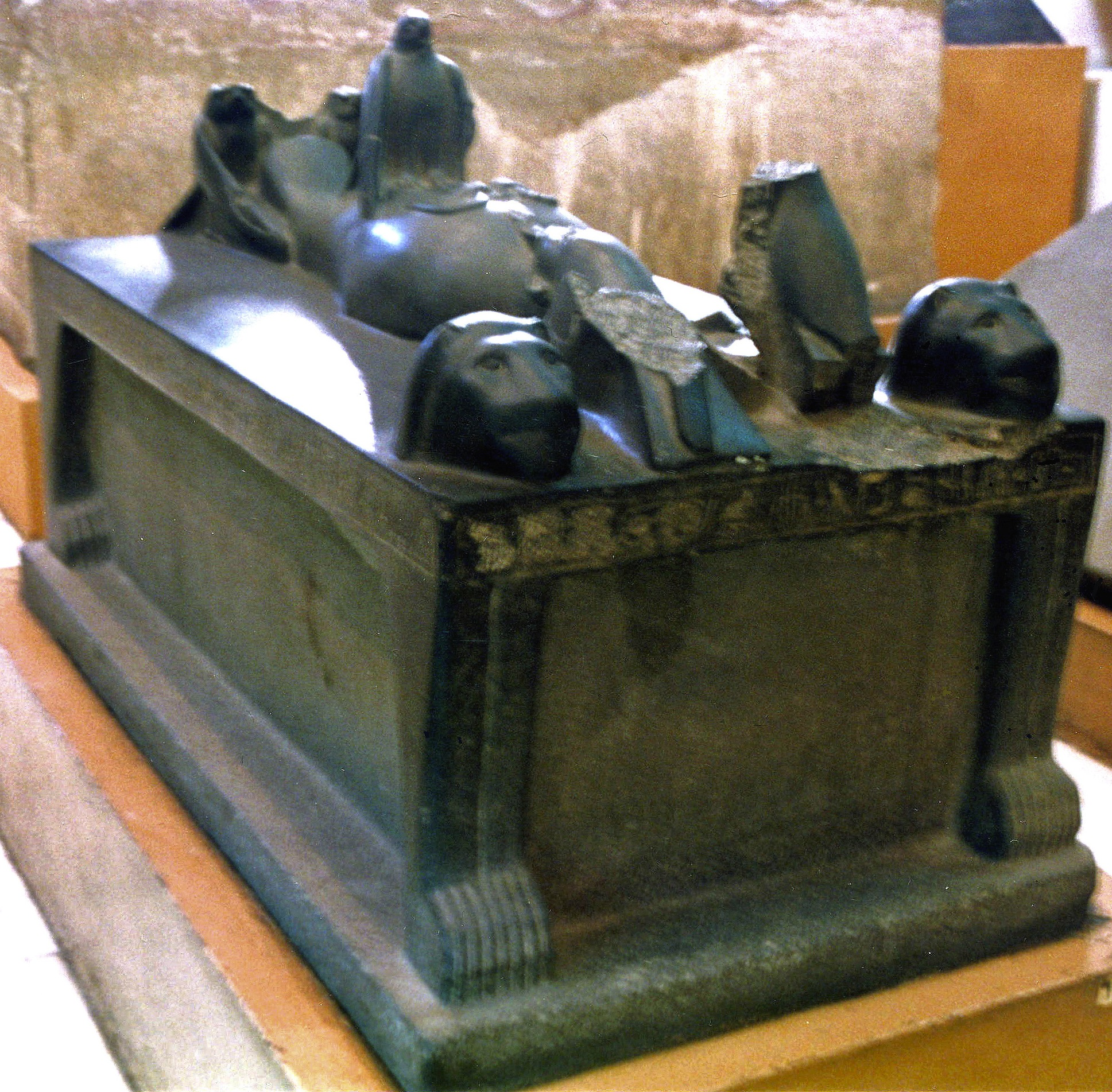
- The Bed of Osiris, from the tomb of Djer, and inscribed with the name of Djedkheperew.

Pharaoh
- Reign: 2 years, 1772–1770 BC (Ryholt), a few months (Baker), 7 months c. 1760 BC (Verner), c. 1732 BC (Schneider)
- Predecessor: Sekhemrekhutawy Khabaw
- Successor: Sedjefakare or Sebkay
Royal titulary
Horus name
Djedkheperew
Ḏd-ḫprw
Enduring of manifestations
G5	R11 R11 L1 w
Nebty name
Djedmesu
Ḏd-msw
Enduring of births
G16	L1 F31 w Z3
Golden Horus
Biknebu Aa[...]
Bik-nbw-ˁ3...
The golden falcon, great ...
G8 O29V HASH
Prenomen
...kare
...k3-Rˁ
... Ka of Ra
M23 t L2 t < N5 HASH kA >
- Father: possibly Hor
- Mother: possibly Nubhotepti I
- Dynasty: 13th Dynasty

Djedkheperew (also known as Djedkheperu) was an Egyptian pharaoh of the 13th Dynasty reigning for an estimated two-year period, from c. 1772 BC until 1770 BC. According to Egyptologists Kim Ryholt and Darrell Baker, Djedkheperew was the 17th king of this dynasty. Djedkheperew is this pharaoh's Horus name; the prenomen and nomen of Djedkheperew, which would normally be employed by modern conventions to name a pharaoh, are unknown.

== Attestations ==
Contemporary attestations

The reign of Djedkheperew is supported by eleven seal impressions from Egyptian fortresses at the second cataract in Nubia. Ten of these seal impressions were found at Uronarti in close association with seal impressions of Sekhemrekhutawy Khabaw and Maaibre Sheshi. The last one was discovered in Mirgissa.

Besides the seal impressions, Djedkheperew is authenticated by the Bed of Osiris, a massive sculpture of black basalt showing Osiris lying on a bier. The Bed of Osiris was found in the tomb of the 1st Dynasty pharaoh Djer, which the ancient Egyptians had come to identify with the tomb of Osiris. The sculpture is now in the Egyptian Museum. The sculpture was tentatively attributed to another 13th Dynasty pharaoh, Khendjer, by Leahy, but recent examinations of the inscriptions proved that it originally bore the name of Djedkheperew. The nomen of Djedkheperew was erased at some point in antiquity, but carelessly enough that some of it is still readable.

On the Turin canon

Djedkheperew is not mentioned on the Turin canon, a king list compiled in the early Ramesside period, which serves as a reference document for the history of the Second Intermediate Period. Ryholt argues that this is because Djedkheperew's reign (as well as that of his predecessor, Sekhemrekhutawy Khabaw and immediate successor(s) Sebkay, all absent from the canon) was already lost in a lacuna of the document from which the canon was copied. That this must be true is indicated by artifacts showing that Khabaw succeeded Hor on the throne and Sebkay as a predecessor(s) of Amenemhat VII, when the canon lists Amenemhat VII directly as Hor's successor (column 7, lines 17 and 18).

== Family and reign ==
According to Ryholt, Djedkheperew was a brother of his predecessor Sekhemrekhutawy Khabaw and a son of pharaoh Hor Awibre. Ryholt based his conclusion on the seals from Uronarti and the Bed of Osiris. The seals show that Khabaw and Djedkheperew reigned closely in time, while what remains of the name of Djedkheperew on the Bed of Osiris shows that his nomen started with hrw. This suggests that Djedkheperew's nomen indicated his filiation to Hor. Since Khabaw is known to have succeeded Hor, Ryholt deduced that Djedkheperew was Khabaw's brother and successor.

== See also ==
- List of pharaohs

Preceded by Sekhemrekhutawy Khabaw	Pharaoh of Egypt; Thirteenth Dynasty	Succeeded by Sebkay
