= Nedjemibre =

Egyptian pharaoh

Pharaoh
- Reign: 7 months, c. 1780 BC or 1736 BC
- Predecessor: Sewadjkare I
- Successor: Khaankhre Sobekhotep
Royal titulary
Prenomen
Nedjemibre
Nḏm-jb-Rˁ
Ra he who is pleasing of heart
< ra nDm m mDAt ib HASH >
Nomen
Unknown, possibly though not likely Amenemhet in which case he would the father of a Ranisonb
- Dynasty: 13th dynasty

Nedjemibre was an ephemeral Egyptian pharaoh of the 13th Dynasty of Egypt during the Second Intermediate Period reigning c. 1780 BC or 1736 BC.

According to Egyptologists Kim Ryholt and Darrell Baker he was the twelfth pharaoh of the dynasty, while Detlef Franke and Jürgen von Beckerath see him as the eleventh ruler.

Nedjemibre is known solely from the Turin canon, a king list compiled in the early Ramesside period. The canon gives his name on the 7th column, line 14 (Gardiner entry 6.14) and credits him with a very short reign of "7 months and [lost days]". Nedjemibre's successor, Khaankhre Sobekhotep, being well attested and never mentioning his parentage led Ryholt to propose that Khaankhre Sobekhotep was not of royal birth and usurped the throne at the expense of Nedjemibre.

Preceded by Sewadjkare I	Pharaoh of Egypt; Thirteenth Dynasty	Succeeded by Khaankhre Sobekhotep
