= Khaankhre Sobekhotep =

13th Dynasty Egyptian king

- Sobekhotep I, Sobekhotep II, Sobekhotep IV (depending on chronology)
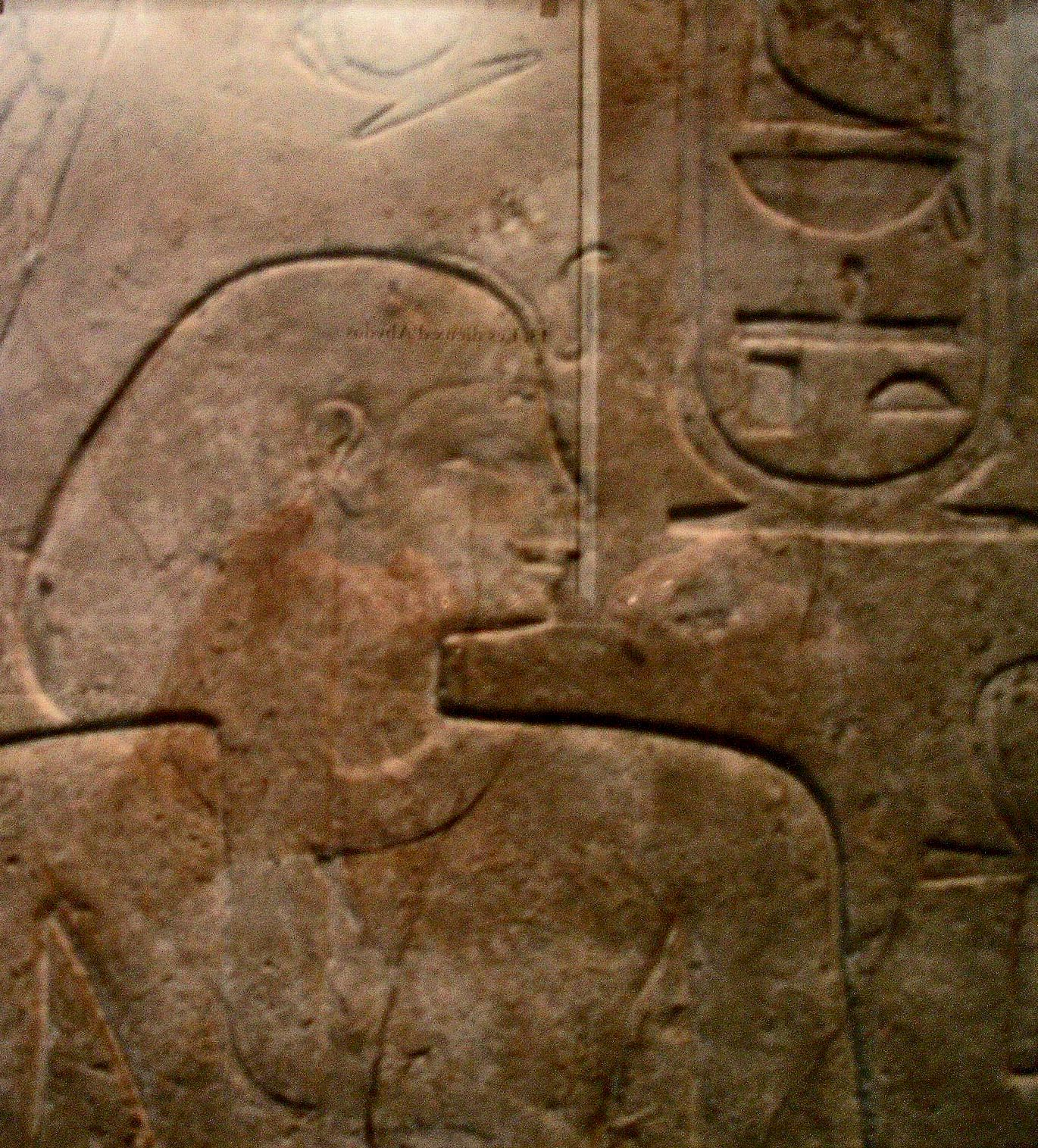
- Sebekhotep II on one of the blocks from a chapel of Abydos, Louvre, B. 3-5, C. 9-10.

Pharaoh
- Reign: three to four-and-a-half years, c. 1735 BC
- Predecessor: Nedjemibre
- Successor: Renseneb
Royal titulary
Horus name
Sematawy
Smȝ-tȝ.wj
He who unifies the two lands
G5	F36 N19 N23 N23
Nebty name
Djedkhaw
Ḏd-ḫˁjw
He whose apparitions are enduring
G16	R11 R11 N28 D36 Z2
Golden Horus
Kawnetjeru
Kȝw-nṯr.w
The Kas of the gods
G8 D28 Z2 R8A
Prenomen
Khaankhre
ḫˁj-ˁnḫ-Rˁ
Living is the apparition of Ra
M23 t L2 t < N5 N28 S34 >
Nomen
Sobekhotep
Sbk-ḥtp
Sobek is satisfied
G39 N5 < s b k R4 X1 Q3 >
Turin King List: Sobek[hotep] Ra[...]
Sbk -..p..-Rˁ
Sobek is satisfied, Ra [...]
< N5 I4 HASH p >
- Monuments: Chapel in Abydos
- Dynasty: 13th Dynasty

Khaankhre Sobekhotep was a minor king of the Thirteenth Dynasty of Egypt during the Second Intermediate Period.

His chronological position is much debated. In literature, Khaankhre Sobekhotep is known as Sobekhotep I. However, he is now believed to be Sobekhotep II or Sobekhotep IV (in some newer studies), adding to the confusion.

== Attestations ==
At Abydos, Khaankhre Sobekhotep is attested by a relief from a chapel. Of unknown provenance is a fragment of an inscribed column. His name Khaankhre Sobekhotep also appears on a granite statue pedestal.

=== Non-contemporary attestations ===
==== Karnak King List ====
The Karnak king list preserves his prenomen Khaankhre. This list of kings was made during the reign of Thutmose III.

==== Abydos King List ====
Other king lists, like the Abydos King List simply omitted all rulers between Amenemhat IV and Ahmose I - perhaps because they were minor kings who only controlled some estates or parts of the country in competition with other claimants.

==== Turin King List ====
The Turin canon 6:15 preserves the nomen Sobek[hote]pre. The addition of -re may be a scribal error, as the correct entry would be Sobekhotep. This list of kings was made during the reign of Ramesses II. Khaankhre Sobekhotep is often associated with this entry, but it is not certain. The nomen Sobekhotep can refer to any king using this nomen, for instance Sobekhotep I. This part of the king list is also so fragmentary and uncertain that it is hard to interpret.

The nomen Sobekhotep as used by Khaankhre is without the Sobek-hieroglyph used in the Turin King List.

== Theories ==
While Khaankhre Sobekhotep is regarded as a ruler of the 13th Dynasty, his chronological position is debated.

His reign was most likely short. Ryholt has suggested three to four-and-a-half years.

According to egyptologists Kim Ryholt and Darrell Baker, Khaankhre Sobekhotep was the 13th pharaoh of the dynasty and had a short reign c. 1735 BC. Alternatively, Jürgen von Beckerath sees him as the 16th pharaoh of the dynasty.

Ryholt mentions that Sobekhotep I may be identical with Sobekhotep II, who is only mentioned as Sobekhotep in the Turin King List. Others, like Dodson, consider Khaankhre Sobekhotep II and Sekhemre Khutawy Sobekhotep I to be two different rulers from the 13th Dynasty, while Bierbrier lists Khaankhre Sobekhotep I and Sekhemre Khutawy Sobekhotep II.

Recently Simon Connor and Julien Siesse investigated the style of the king's monument and argue that he reigned much later than previously thought (after Sobekhotep IV – who would become Sobekhotep III).

== See also ==
- List of pharaohs

Preceded by Nedjemibre	Pharaoh of Egypt; Thirteenth Dynasty	Succeeded by Renseneb
