= Mazghuna Pyramids =

The Mazghuna Pyramids may refer to:

- Northern Mazghuna pyramid, possibly belonging to Sobekneferu
- Southern Mazghuna pyramid, possibly belonging to Amenemhat IV
