= Ameny Qemau =

Egyptian pharaoh

- Ameny Kemau, Aminikimau, Kemau, Ameny-Amu, Emnikamaw
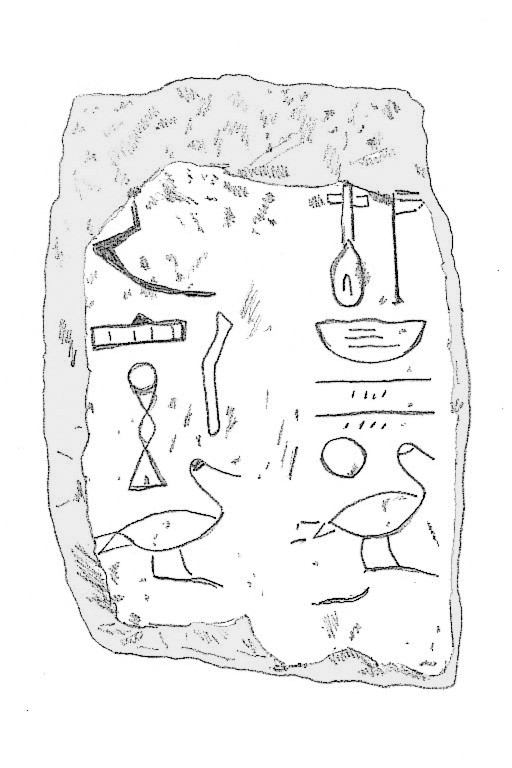
- Drawing of a plaque bearing Qemau's name, now in a private collection

Pharaoh
- Reign: 1793 BC – 1791 BC
- Predecessor: Sekhemkare Amenemhat V
- Successor: Hotepibre Qemau Siharnedjheritef
Royal titulary
Nomen
Ameny Qemau
Jmny [s3]ḳm3w
Ameny['s son] Qemau
G39 N5 < i mn n i i T14 w >
- Consort: possibly Nofret
- Children: princess Hatshepsut; possibly Hotepibre Qemau Siharnedjheritef (filiation)
- Father: Amenemhat, possibly Amenemhat V
- Burial: Pyramid of Ameny Qemau in south Dahshur base 50m, height 35m
- Dynasty: 13th Dynasty

Ameny Qemau was an Egyptian pharaoh of the early 13th Dynasty in the late Middle Kingdom.

== Family ==
The Egyptologist Kim Ryholt notes that Ameny Qemau's name is essentially a filiative nomen, that is, a name specifying the filiation of its holder. Indeed, Ameny Qemau could be read as "Ameny['s son] Qemau". Ryholt concludes that the Ameny in question was Qemau's predecessor Sekhemkare Amenemhat V and that Qemau was his son. This opinion is shared by Egyptologist Darrell Baker but not by Jürgen von Beckerath, who left Ameny Qemau's position within the 13th Dynasty undetermined in his handbook of Egyptian pharaohs. The successor of Ameny Qemau, Qemau Siharnedjheritef may have been his son as "Qemau Siharnedjheritef" may be read "The son of Qemau, Horus protects his father".

== Attestations ==
Ameny Qemau is a poorly attested king, his name does not appear on the Turin canon.

=== Dahshur, Pyramid of Ameny Qemau ===
At Dahshur South, the Pyramid of Ameny Qemau contained fragments of four inscribed canopic jars inscribed with his name.

=== Plaquette ===
Of Unknown Provenence, a plaquette bears his name but may be a modern forgery.

=== Dahshur, Pyramid of Hatshepsut ===
His name was also associated with a pyramid for king's daughter, Hatshepsut. At Dahshur, the name of Ameny Qemau is believed to appear on an inscribed block which was found in a newly discovered pyramid whose existence was announced in April 2017. Many Egyptologists such as James P. Allen, Aidan Dodson and Thomas Schneider agrees that the royal name on the block is that of Ameny Qemau. Dodson further speculated that, given the relatively poor quality of the inscription and the oddity for a pharaoh to be the owner of two pyramids, the newly discovered one may have originally belonged to one of Qemau's predecessors, and that he may have usurped the structure by chiseling out the royal names on the block and superimposing his own cartouches on it. Among the artifacts found in the burial chamber were a sarcophagus, canopic jars, and boxes of wrappings. Inscriptions on the boxes mention one of the daughters of Ameny Qemau, Hatshepsut, suggesting that the pyramid may have been usurped for his daughter and may explain why he has two pyramids.

== Burial ==
At Dahshur South, the Pyramid of Ameny Qemau was discovered in 1957 by Charles Musès and investigated in 1968. It originally measured 50 square meters at its base and stood 35 meters high but is now completely ruined due to stone robbing. The substructures have also been extensively damaged. The burial chamber of the king was made of a single large block of quartzite, similar to those found in the pyramid of Amenemhat III at Hawara and the Mazghuna pyramids. The block was hewn to receive the sarcophagus and canopic jars of the king but only fragments of these and unidentified bones were found onsite.

== Theories ==
Ameny Qemau's identity is uncertain and attempts have been made to identify him with better attested kings of the period, in particular with Sehotepibre, who appears on the Turin canon after Amenemhat V. Ryholt however believes that Qemau's name was lost in a wsf lacuna of the Turin canon located just before Amenemhat V. A wsf (literally "missing") lacuna denotes a lacuna in the original document from which the canon was copied in Ramesside times. According to Egyptologists Kim Ryholt and Darrell Baker, he was the 5th king of the dynasty, reigning for 2 years over most of Egypt, except perhaps the eastern Nile Delta, from 1793 BC until 1791 BC.

== See also ==
- List of pharaohs

Preceded by Amenemhat V	Pharaoh of Egypt; Thirteenth Dynasty	Succeeded by Qemau Siharnedjheritef
