= Hotepibre =

Egyptian pharaoh

Hotepibre Qemau Siharnedjheritef alt_name = Sehotepibre Hornedjheritef
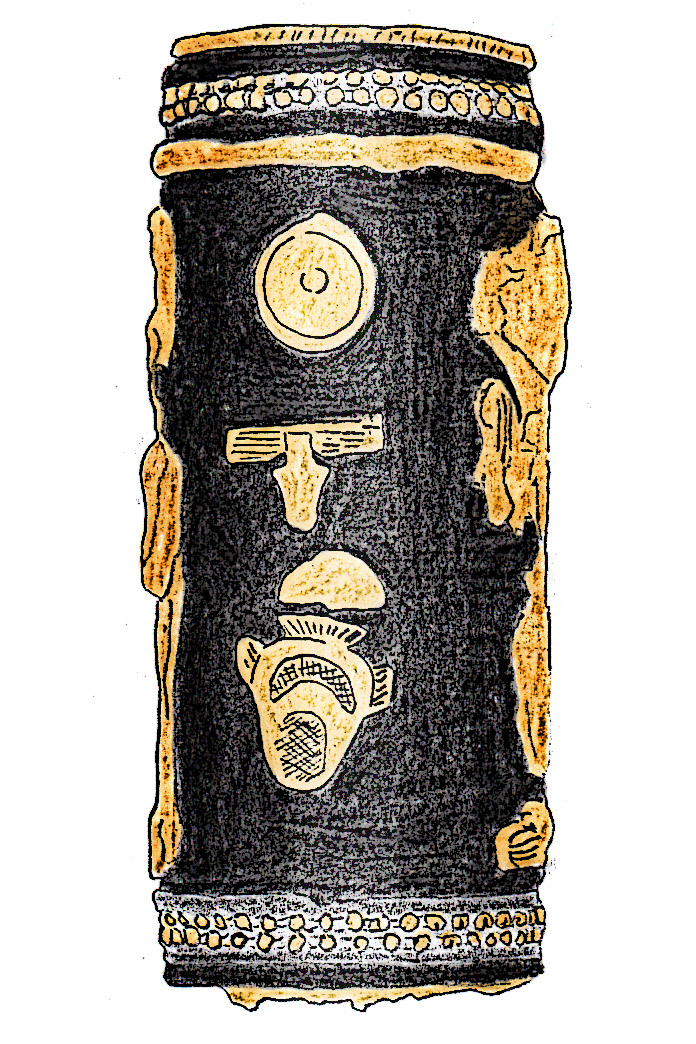
- Drawing of the ceremonial mace handle with Hotepibre's name, from Ebla

Pharaoh
- Reign: 1 to 5 years possible, 1791 BC - 1788 BC (Ryholt)
- Predecessor: Ameny Qemau
- Successor: Iufni
Royal titulary
Prenomen
Hotepibre
Ḥtp-jb-Rˁ
Satisfied is the heart of Ra
M23 t L2 t < N5 R4 t p ib >
Turin canon:
Sehotepibre
Sḥtp-jb-Rˁ
He who satisfies the heart of Ra
< N5 s R4 t p ib Z1 >
Nomen
Qemau Siharnedjheritef
Qm3.w s3 Ḥr.(w)-nḏ-hr-jt=f
Qemau's son, Horus he who seizes his power

G39 N5	T14 G43 G39 G5 Aa27 I10 D2 t I9
- Father: Ameny Qemau?
- Dynasty: 13th dynasty

Hotepibre Qemau Siharnedjheritef (also Sehetepibre I or Sehetepibre II depending on the scholar) was an Egyptian pharaoh of the 13th Dynasty during the Second Intermediate Period.

== Family ==
Qemau Siharnedjheritef complete nomen means "Qemau's son, Horus he who seizes his power" and from this it is likely that he was the son of his predecessor Ameny Qemau and the grandson of king Amenemhat V. Ryholt further proposes that he was succeeded by a king named Iufni, who may have been his brother or uncle. After the short reign of Iufni, the throne went to another grandson of Amenemhat V named Ameny Antef Amenemhat VI.

== Attestations ==
There are several attestations of Hotepibre in Lower Egypt and exchange with the Northern Levant.

=== Lower Egypt ===
==== Khatana ====
A seated statue on a throne dedicated to Ptah and bearing the name of Hotepibre was found in Khatana, but its location of origin is unknown.

==== el-Atawla, temple-block ====
At Per Nemty (el-Atawla), near Asyut (5 km) in the 12th Nome of Upper Egypt, a temple block with his name is now in the Cairo Museum (Temp 25.4.22.3).

==== Tell el-Dab'a, palace ====
Hotepibre is sometimes also credited as the founder of a palace recently rediscovered at Tell El-Dab'a (the ancient Avaris).

=== Levant ===
==== Ebla (Inner Syria), ceremonial mace ====
This pharaoh is also known by a ceremonial mace found inside the so-called "Tomb of the Lord of the Goats" in Ebla, in modern northern Syria; the mace was a gift from Hotepibre to the Eblaite king Immeya who was his contemporary.

== Speculations ==
According to egyptologists Kim Ryholt and Darrell Baker, he was the sixth king of the dynasty, reigning for one to five years, possibly three years, from 1791 BC until 1788 BC. Alternatively, Jürgen von Beckerath and Detlef Franke see him as the ninth king of the dynasty.
