= Filiative nomen =

In ancient Egyptian grammar, a filiative nomen (plural filiative nomina) (Note: Nomen is Latin for "name". Filiative is an adjectival form of filiation, defined as "filial relationship especially of a son to his father" (Merriam-Webster, def. 1a, accessed 2018-04-17).) is a name, typically of a pharaoh, that incorporates the name(s) of the person's father and possibly grandfather.

== See also ==
- Nomen (Ancient Egypt)
- Prenomen (Ancient Egypt)
