= Thirteenth Dynasty of Egypt =

Ancient Egyptian dynasty

13th Dynasty of Egypt
- c. 1802 BC–c. 1649 BC
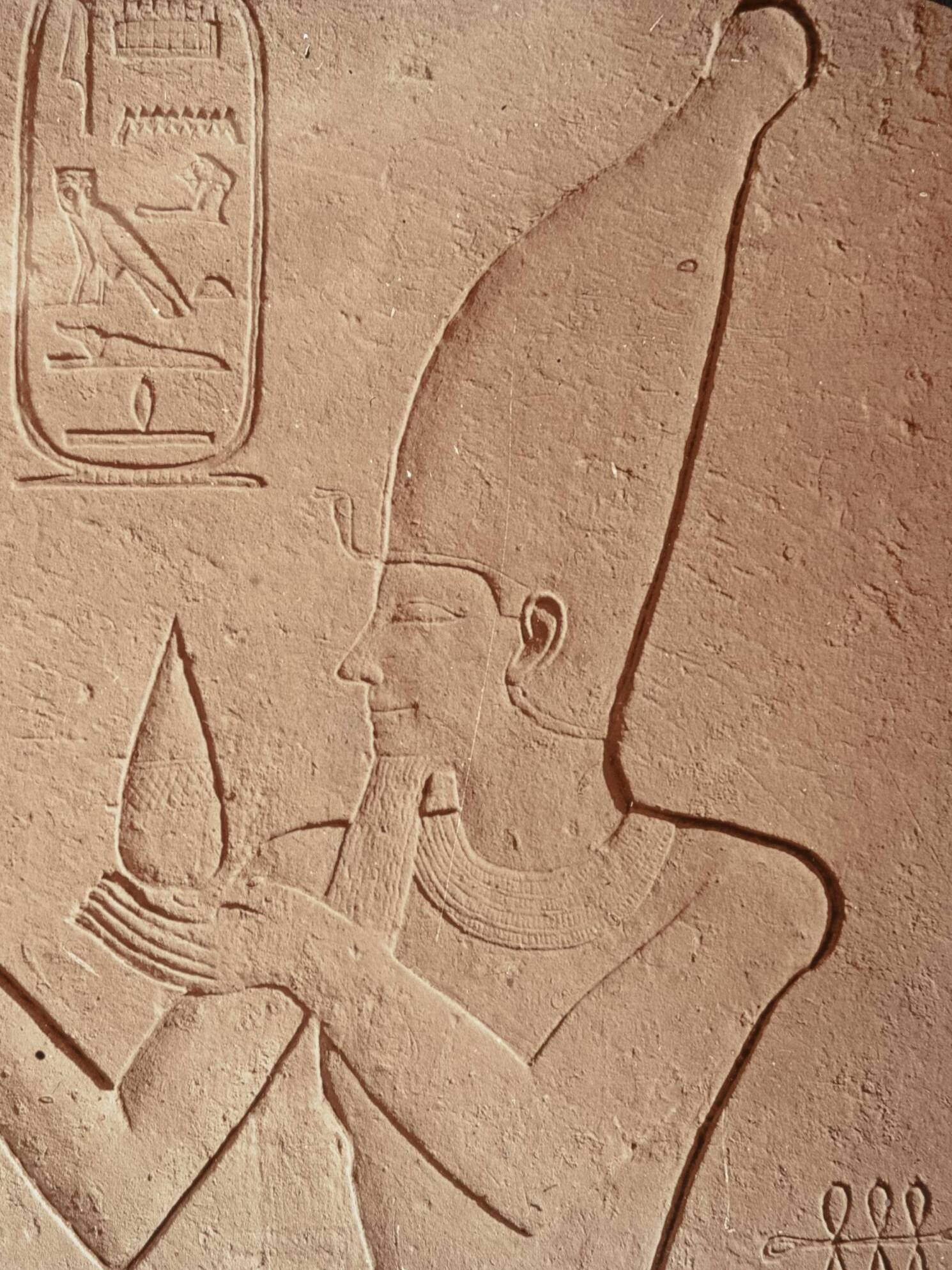
- Portrait of king Amenemhat Sobekhotep I
- Capital: Itjtawy (c. 1802 BC – c. 1677 BC); Thebes (c. 1677 BC – c. 1649 BC)
- Common languages: Egyptian
- Religion: ancient Egyptian religion
- Government: Absolute monarchy
- Monarch
  - c. 1802–c. 1800 BC (first): Amenemhat Sobekhotep I
  - c. 1649 BC (last): Se[...]enre
- Historical era: Second Intermediate Period of Egypt
  - Established: c. 1802 BC
  - Disestablished: c. 1649 BC
Preceded by
12th Dynasty of Egypt
Succeeded by
14th Dynasty of Egypt
15th Dynasty of Egypt
16th Dynasty of Egypt
Abydos Dynasty

The Thirteenth Dynasty of ancient Egypt (notated Dynasty XIII) was a series of rulers from around 1802 BC until around 1649 BC, around 153 years. It is often classified as the final dynasty of the Middle Kingdom (which includes Dynasties 11, 12, and 14), but some historians instead group it in the Second Intermediate Period (with Dynasties 14 through 17).

The 13th Dynasty initially ruled from the Nile Delta to the second cataract of the Nile. However, the dynasty marked a period of decline and instability, with the Canaanite Dynasty 14 rising concurrently and the Hyksos Dynasty 15 taking control shortly after.

Amenemhat Sobekhotep I is usually considered the 13th Dynasty's first king, and Ay I, while not the final king, was the last to occupy the Middle Kingdom capital of Itjtawy, and the last of the dynasty with a significant recorded reign.

== Chronology and rulers ==
Egyptologist Kim Ryholt (1997:190) argues that the 13th Dynasty lasted from 1803-1649 BC, lasting around 154 years.

According to Ryholt, the 13th Dynasty had some continuity with the preceding 12th Dynasty. With the first king, Sobekhotep I, being the son of a certain Amenemhat, Ryholt proposes Amenemhat IV of the 12th Dynasty as a possible father. This is unlikely as Amenemhat IV was succeeded by his sister Sobekneferu and not directly by Sobekhotep I, suggesting that Amenemhat IV didn't have any children.

Ryholt also proposes that the demarcation between the two dynasties reflects the rise of the independent 14th Dynasty in the eastern Delta, an event which, he proposes, occurred during Sobekneferu's reign. As direct heirs to the kings of the 12th Dynasty, kings of the 13th Dynasty reigned from Memphis over Middle and Upper Egypt, all the way to the second cataract to the south. The power of the 13th Dynasty waned progressively over its 153 years of existence and it finally came to an end with the conquest of Memphis by the Hyksos rulers of the 15th Dynasty, around 1649 BC. According to Kim Ryholt, the 13th dynasty's power reached its height under three successive powerful ruling kings named Sobekhotep III, Neferhotep I, and Sobekhotep IV, but the administration's power appears to have collapsed many decades later after the reign of Ay I, who is the last 13th Dynasty king to be attested in both Lower and Upper Egypt.

In later texts, this dynasty is usually described as an era of chaos and disorder. However, the period may have been more peaceful than was once thought since the central government in Itjtawy near the Faiyum was sustained during most of the dynasty and the country remained relatively stable. The period was undoubtedly characterized by decline, with a large number of kings with short reigns and only a few historical attestations. The true chronology of this dynasty is difficult to determine as there are few monuments dating from the period. Many of the kings' names are only known from odd fragmentary inscriptions or from scarabs. The names and order in the table are based on three Egyptologists, Dodson, Hilton, and Ryholt.

13th Dynasty Monarchs of Egypt
Portrait	Name	Reign	Burial	Consort(s)	Lifespan	Comments
	Amenemhat Sobekhotep I	c. 1802 - c. 1800 BC			Died c. 1800 BC	The dominant hypothesis is that Amenemhat Sobekhotep I was the founder of the dynasty, in older studies Wegaf
	Amenemhat Senebef	c. 1800 - c. 1796 BC			Died c. 1796 BC	Perhaps a son of Amenemhat IV and brother of Sekhemre Khutawy Sobekhotep
	Nerikare	c. 1796 BC			Died c. 1796 BC	
	Amenemhat V	c. 1796 - c. 1793 BC			Died c. 1793 BC	
	Ameny Qemau	c. 1793 - c. 1792 BC	Pyramid of Ameny Qemau		Died c. 1792 BC	
	Qemau Siharnedjheritef	c. 1792 - c. 1790 BC			Died c. 1790 BC	Perhaps identical with King Sehotepibre in the Turin Canon
	Iufni	c. 1790 - c. 1788 BC			Died c. 1788 BC	Known only from the Turin canon
	Ameny Amenemhat VI	c. 1788 - c. 1785 BC			Died c. 1785 BC	
	Nebnuni	c. 1785 - c. 1783 BC			Died c. 1783 BC	
	Sehetepibre	c. 1783 - c. 1781 BC			Died c. 1781 BC	
	Sewadjkare I	c. 1781 BC			Died c. 1781 BC	Known only from the Turin canon
	Nedjemibre	c. 1781 - c. 1780 BC			Died c. 1780 BC	Known only from the Turin canon
	Sobekhotep II	c. 1780 - c. 1777 BC			Died c. 1777 BC	
	Renseneb	c. 1777 BC			Died c. 1777 BC	
	Hor	c. 1777 - c. 1775 BC	Dahshur		Died c. 1775 BC	
	Sekhemrekhutawy	c. 1775 - c. 1772 BC			Died c. 1772 BC	Possibly a son of Hor Awybre
	Djedkheperew	c. 1772 - c. 1770 BC			Died c. 1770 BC	Possibly a brother of Sekhemrekhutawy
	Sebkay	c. 1770 - c. 1769 BC			Died c. 1769 BC	Possibly two kings, Seb and his son Kay
	Kay Amenemhat VII	c. 1769 - c. 1767 BC			Died c. 1767 BC	
	Wegaf	c. 1767 BC			Died c. 1767 BC	
	Khendjer	c. 1767 - c. 1759 BC	Pyramid of Khendjer	Seneb[henas?]	Died c. 1759 BC	May also have borne the name Nimaatre
	Imyremeshaw	c. 1759 - c. 1757 BC			Died c. 1757 BC	
	Intef	c. 1757 - c. 1755 BC			Died c. 1755 BC	
	Seth Meribre	c. 1755 BC			Died c. 1755 BC	
	Sobekhotep III	c. 1755 - c. 1751 BC		Senebhenas; Neni	Died c. 1751 BC	
	Neferhotep I	c. 1751 - c. 1740 BC		Senebsen	Died c. 1740 BC	
	Sihathor	c. 1740 - c. 1739 BC			Died c. 1739 BC	Ephemeral coregent with his brother Neferhotep I
	Sobekhotep IV	c. 1739 - c. 1730 BC		Tjan	Died c. 1730 BC	Brother of Neferhotep I and Sihathor
	Sobekhotep V	c. 1730 - c. 1727 BC			Died c. 1727 BC	
	Sobekhotep VI	c. 1720 BC			Died c. 1720 BC	
	Ibiau	c. 1713 BC			Died c. 1713 BC	
	Ay I	c. 1690 BC	Built a pyramid whose location is unknown, maybe near Memphis		Died c. 1690 BC	Reigned around 23 years, the longest reign of the dynasty. Last king to be attested in both Lower and Upper Egypt.

Following these kings, the remaining rulers of the 13th Dynasty are only attested by finds from Upper Egypt. This may indicate the abandonment of the old capital Itjtawy in favor of Thebes. Daphna Ben Tor believes that this event was triggered by the invasion of the eastern Delta and the Memphite region by Canaanite rulers. For some authors, this marks the end of the Middle Kingdom and the beginning of the Second Intermediate Period. This analysis is rejected by Ryholt and Baker however, who note that the stele of Seheqenre Sankhptahi, reigning toward the end of the dynasty, strongly suggests that he reigned over Memphis. The stele is of unknown provenance.

13th Dynasty Monarchs of Egypt continued
Portrait	Name	Reign	Lifespan	Comments
	Ini	c. 1677 - c. 1675 BC	Died c. 1675 BC	Also known as Ini I
	Sewadjtu	c. 1675 - c. 1672 BC	Died c. 1672 BC	
	Hori	c. 1669 - c. 1664 BC	Died c. 1664 BC	Also known as Hori II
	Sobekhotep VII	c. 1664 - c. 1663 BC	Died c. 1663 BC	
	Unknown			
	Unknown			
	Unknown			
	Unknown			
	Unknown			
	Unknown			
	Unknown			
	Unknown			
	Merkheperre	c. 1656 BC	Died c. 1656 BC	
	Merkare	c. 1656 BC	Died c. 1656 BC	Known only from the Turin canon
	Unknown			
	Unknown			
	Unknown			
	[...]mosre			
	Ibi [...]maatre			
	Hor [...] [...]webenre			
	Sekhemkare II	c. 1653 BC	Died c. 1653 BC	Name reconstructed as Sekhemkare based on a hypothesis by Darrell Baker filling the lacunae in the Turin King List and the Seheqenre Sankhptahi stele
	[...]re			
	Se[...]enre	c. 1649 BC	Died c. 1649 BC	Possibly the Turin canon's preservation of the prenomen Sewahenre

The chronological position of a number of attested rulers could not be conclusively determined due to a lack of evidence:

13th Dynasty Monarchs of Egypt, undetermined position
Portrait	Name	Comments
	Neferhotep II	Possibly the same as Mersekhemre Ined
	Ini II	According to von Beckerath, successor of Sewadjare Mentuhotep V and predecessor of Merkheperre
	Senebmiu	According to von Beckerath, successor of Se[...]kare
	Mentuhotep V	
	Sankhptahi	Represented on a stele offering to Ptah
	Dedumose I	
	Dedumose II	Possibly a vassal of the Hyksos
	Montemsaf	
	Senusret IV	Possibly ruled in the 17th dynasty
	Nebmaatre	Possibly ruled in the 17th dynasty
	Sobekhotep IX	

=== Sobekhotep I and II ===
Ryholt posits a ruler named "Sobkhotep I Sekhemre Khutawy" as the first king of this dynasty. This is now the dominant hypothesis in Egyptology and Sobekhotep Sekhemre Khutawy is referred to as Sobekhotep I in this article. Ryholt thus credits Sekhemre Khutawy Sobkhotep I with a reign of 3 to 4 years around 1800 BC and proposes that Khaankhre Sobekhotep II reigned around 1780 BC. Dodson and Hilton similarly believe that Sekhemre Khutawy Sobekhotep predated Khaankhre Sobekhotep.

=== Successors ===
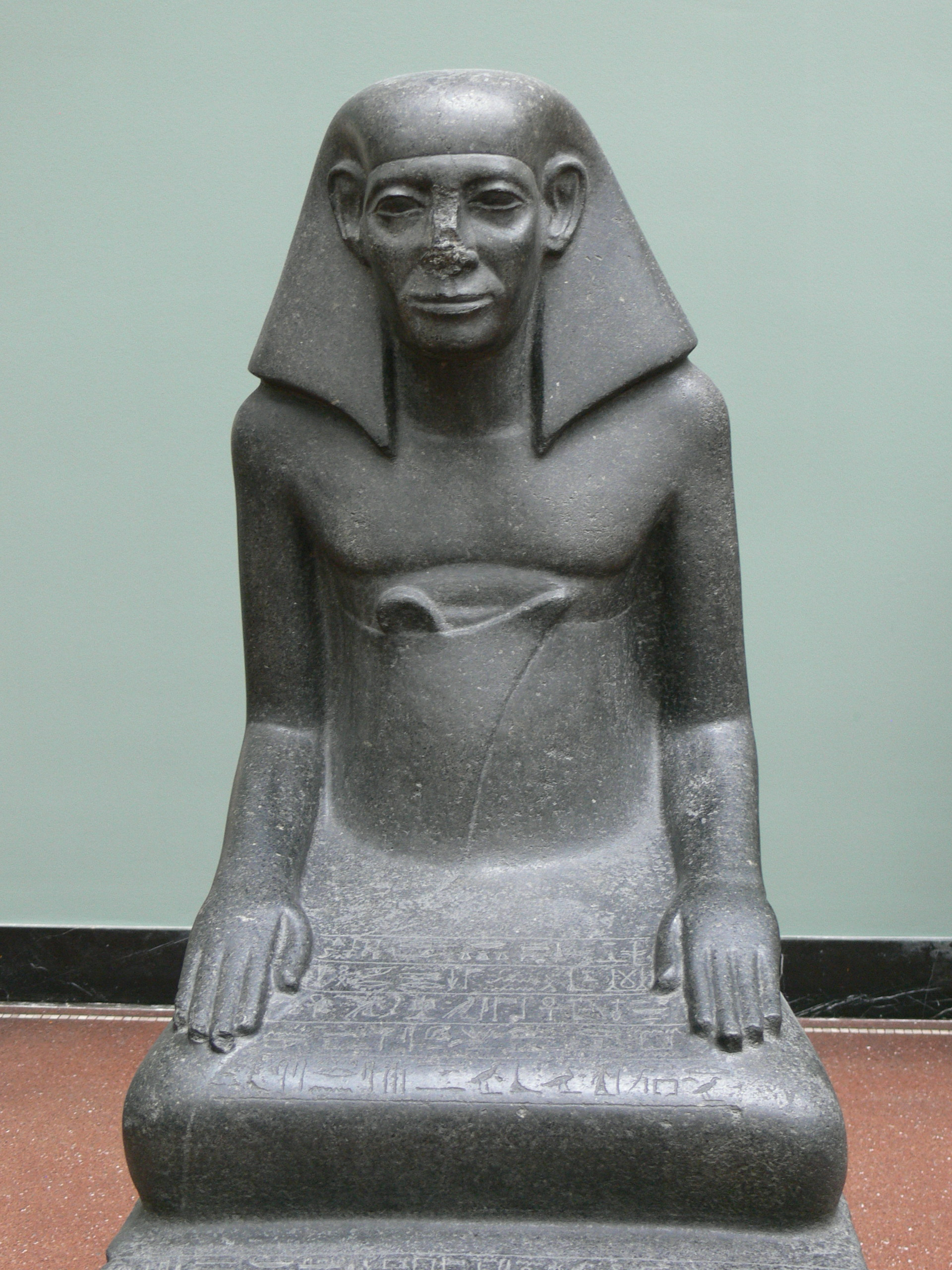
Statue of the royal sealer and high steward Gebu, 13th dynasty, around 1700 BC from the temple of Amun in Karnak

After allowing discipline at the southern forts to deteriorate, the government eventually withdrew its garrisons and, not long afterward, the forts were reoccupied by the rising Nubian state of Kush. In the north, Lower Egypt was overrun by the Hyksos, a Semitic people from across the Sinai. An independent line of kings created Dynasty XIV that arose in the western Delta during later Dynasty XIII. According to Manetho, into this unstable mix came invaders from the east called the Hyksos who seized Egypt "without striking a blow; and having overpowered the rulers of the land, they then burned our cities ruthlessly, razed to the ground the temples of gods..." Their regime, called Dynasty 15, was claimed to have replaced Dynasties 13 and 14 in most of the country.

However, recent archaeological finds at Edfu could indicate that the Hyksos 15th dynasty was already in existence at least by the mid-13th dynasty reign of king Sobekhotep IV. In a recently published paper in Egypt and the Levant, Nadine Moeller, Gregory Marouard and N. Ayers discuss the discovery of an important early 12th dynasty Middle Kingdom administrative building in the eastern Tell Edfu area of Upper Egypt which was in continual use into the early Second Intermediate Period until the 17th dynasty, when its remains were sealed up by a large silo court. Fieldwork by Egyptologists in 2010 and 2011 into the remains of the former 12th dynasty building which was also used in the 13th dynasty led to the discovery of a large adjoining hall which proved to contain 41 sealings showing the cartouche of the Hyksos ruler Khyan together with 9 sealings naming the 13th dynasty king Sobekhotep IV. The preserved contexts of these seals shows that Sobekhotep IV and Khyan were most likely contemporaries of one another. This could mean that the 13th dynasty did not control all of Egypt when Sobekhotep IV acceded to power, and that there was a significant overlap between the 13th and 15th dynasties since Sobekhotep IV was only a mid-13th dynasty ruler; although one of its most powerful kings. Therefore, Manetho's statement that the Hyksos 15th dynasty violently replaced the 13th dynasty could be a piece of later Egyptian propaganda. Rather, the 13th dynasty's authority must have been collapsing throughout Egypt in its final decades and the Hyksos state in the Delta region simply took over Memphis and ended the 13th dynasty's kingdom. However, this analysis and the conclusions drawn from it are rejected by Egyptologist Robert Porter, who argues that Khyan ruled much later than Sobekhotep IV (a gap of around 100 years exists between the two in conventional chronologies) and that the seals of a pharaoh were used long after his death. Thus the seals of Sobekhotep IV might not indicate that he was a contemporary of Khyan.

Ay I was the last Egyptian ruler of the 13th Dynasty who is attested by objects in both Lower and Upper Egypt. Henceforth, his successors, from Ini on, are only attested in Upper Egypt.

== Comparison of regnal lists ==
This dynasty is not as well-documented in surviving king lists compared to the preceding Twelfth Dynasty. The Abydos King List and Saqqara Tablet both completely ignore this dynasty. The Turin King List has the most complete surviving list of names but is in a very fragmentary condition and many names and reign lengths are now lost. The Turin King List originally had 53 names for this dynasty. Manetho's now-lost work Aegyptiaca stated that this dynasty was made up of 60 kings who ruled for 453 years. However, no names survive in any of the quotations or epitomes of Aegyptiaca. The Karnak King List does include some names for kings of this dynasty but the names are not placed in regnal order, and many names are missing from this list.

Historical Pharaoh	Karnak King List	Turin King List	Turin List Reign Length
Sobekhotep I	Sekhemre Khutawy	Khutawyre	2 years, 3 months and 24 days
Sonbef		[Sekhemkare]	"lacuna" years - missing in the original document.
Nerikare?		–	6 years - listed with Sonbef after the "lacuna" notation, but possibly refers to Nerikare who is otherwise not named in the list.
Amenemhat V		Amenemhat(re)	3 years
Hotepibre		Sehotepibre	Lost
Iufni		Iufni	Lost
Amenemhat VI	Sankhibre	Sankhibre	[Unknown] and 23 [days]
Semenkare Nebnuni		Semenkare	[Unknown] and 22 [days]
Sehetepibre		Sehotepibre	1+ months and 27 days
Sewadjkare		Sewadjkare	[Unknown] and 21+ days
Nedjemibre		Nedjemibre	0 years and 7 months
Sobekhotep II	Khaankhre	Sobek[hot]ep	Lost
Renseneb		Ren[se]neb	4 months
Hor		Awtibre	[Unknown] and 7 days
Sedjefakare Kay Amenemhat VII		Sedjefa[..]kare	Lost
Wegaf	Khutawire	Sekhemre Khutawy Sobekhotep	Lost
Khendjer		User[ka]re Khendjer	Lost
Imyremeshaw		[Smenkh]kare Imyremeshaw	[Unknown] and 4 days
Sehetepkare Intef	Intef	[Sehotep]ka[re] Intef	[Unknown] and 3 days
Seth Meribre		[Mer]ib[re] Seth	[Unknown] and 6 days
Sobekhotep III		Sekhemkare [Wadjtawy] Sobekhotep	4 years, 2 months and [Unknown] days
Neferhotep I	Khasekhemre	Khasekhemre Neferhotep, "son of Haankhef"	11 years, 1 month and [Unknown] days
Sihathor		Sihathor	[Unknown] and 3 days
Sobekhotep IV	Khaneferre	Khaneferre Sobekhotep	Lost
Sobekhotep V	Merhotepre	Name lost	Lost
Sobekhotep VI	Khahotepre	Khahotepre	4 years, 8 months and 29 days
Wahibre Ibiau		Wahibre Iaib	10 years, 8 months and 28 days
Merneferre Ay		Merneferre	23 years, 8 months and 10 days
Merhotepre Ini		Merhotepre	2 years, [2 to 4] months and 9 days
Sankhenre Sewadjtu		Sankhenre Sewadjtu	3 years and [2 to 4] months
Mersekhemre Ined	Mersekhemre	Mersekhemre Ined	3 years, 1 month and 1 [day]
Sewadjkare Hori		Sewadjkare Hori	5 years, [...] and 8 days
Sobekhotep VII	Merkaure	Merkau[re] Sobek[hotep]	2 years, [...] and 4 days
–		Name lost	[Unknown] and 11 days
–		Name lost	Lost
–		Name lost	Lost
–		Name lost	Lost
–		Name lost	Lost
–		Name lost	Lost
–		Name lost	Lost
–		[Me]r ...[re]...	Lost
Merkheperre		Mer-kheper-Re	Lost
Merkare		Merka[re]	Lost
–		Name lost	Lost
–		Name lost	Lost
Sewadjare Mentuhotep?	Sewadj..re	[...]dj[...]	Lost
–		[...]mes[...]	Lost
–		[...]maatre Ibi [...]	Lost
–		[...]webenre Hor [...]	Lost
Sekhemkare II		Se[...]kare [...]	Lost
Seheqenre Sankhptahi?		[...]qaenre [...]	Lost
–		[...]re [...]	Lost
Sewahenre?		[...]enre [...] n ia [...]	Lost

Preceded by 12th Dynasty	Dynasty of Egypt c. 1802 BC − c. 1649 BC	Succeeded by 14th Dynasty
