= Detlef Franke =

German Egyptologist (1952–2007)

- Born: 24 November 1952; Lüneburg, West Germany
- Died: 2 September 2007 (aged 54)
- Occupation: Egyptologist
- Known for: Specialist of the Middle Kingdom of Egypt

Detlef Franke (24 November 1952 – 2 September 2007) was a German Egyptologist specialist of the Middle Kingdom of Egypt.

== Biography ==
Detlef Franke received his doctorate at the University of Hamburg in 1983 with his thesis "Altägyptische Verwandtschaftsbezeichnungen im Mittleren Reich" ("The ancient Egyptian kingship in the Middle Kingdom"). He then received his habilitation at the University of Heidelberg in 1994 with his work "Das Heiligtum des Heqaib auf Elephantine. Geschichte eines Provinzheiligtums im Mittleren Reich" ("On the sanctuary of Heqaib on Elephantine. History of a provincial sanctuary in the Middle Kingdom"). He subsequently taught as a lecturer at this university until his death. Throughout his career, Detlef Franke researched mainly the Middle Kingdom of ancient Egypt. His last project was the creation of a catalog of the stelae of the Middle Kingdom housed in the British Museum.

== Publications ==
- Altägyptische Verwandtschaftsbezeichnungen im Mittleren Reich (= Hamburger ägyptologische Studien. H. 3). Borg, Hamburg 1983, ISBN 3-921598-13-3 (University of Hamburg, thesis dissertation, 1983).
- Personendaten aus dem Mittleren Reich. (20.–16. Jahrhundert v. Chr.). Dossiers 1–796 (= Ägyptologische Abhandlungen. vol. 41). Otto Harrassowitz, Wiesbaden 1984, ISBN 3-447-02484-4.
- Zur Chronologie des Mittleren Reiches (12.-18. Dynastie) Teil 1 : Die 12. Dynastie, in Orientalia 57 (1988)
- Zur Chronologie des Mittleren Reiches. Teil II: Die sogenannte Zweite Zwischenzeit Altägyptens, in Orientalia 57 (1988)
- Das Heiligtum des Heqaib auf Elephantine. Geschichte eines Provinzheiligtums im Mittleren Reich (= Studien zur Archäologie und Geschichte Altägyptens. vol. 9). Heidelberger Orientverlag, Heidelberg 1994, ISBN 3-927552-17-8 (University of Heidelberg, habilitation dissertation, 1991).
- Theben und Memphis – Metropolen in Ägypten. In: Michael Jansen, Bernd Roeck (Hg): Entstehung und Entwicklung von Metropolen (= Veröffentlichungen der Interdisziplinären Arbeitsgruppe Stadtkulturforschung. (VIAS) vol. 4). 2002, (PDF document available online).
- With Marcel Marée (as editor): Egyptian Stelae in the British Museum from the 13th-17th Dynasties: Fascicule I: Descriptions v. I, London 2013, ISBN 978-0714119878

== See also ==
- List of Egyptologists
