= Ankhu =

Egyptian vizier

- Vizier of Egypt
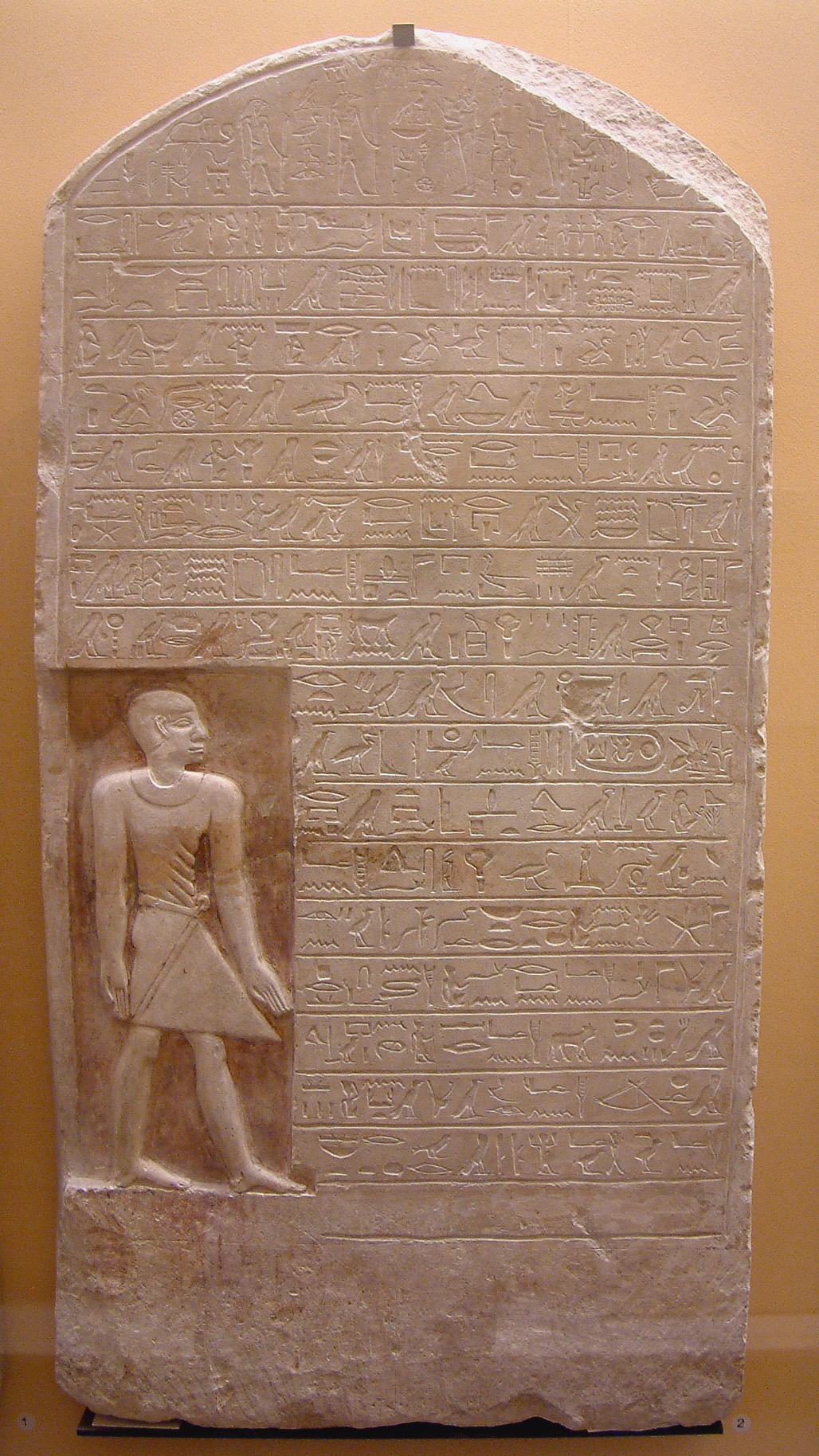
- Stela of Amenyseneb, mentioning Ankhu in the text
- Dynasty: 13th Dynasty
- Pharaoh: Khendjer, Sobekhotep II and others
- Spouse: Mereret
- Father: possibly Zamonth
- Mother: Henutpu
- Children: Resseneb, Iymeru, Senebhenas

Ankhu (ꜥnḫw) was an Egyptian vizier during the early 13th Dynasty in the late Middle Kingdom. He is believed to have resided in Thebes in Upper Egypt.

== Family ==
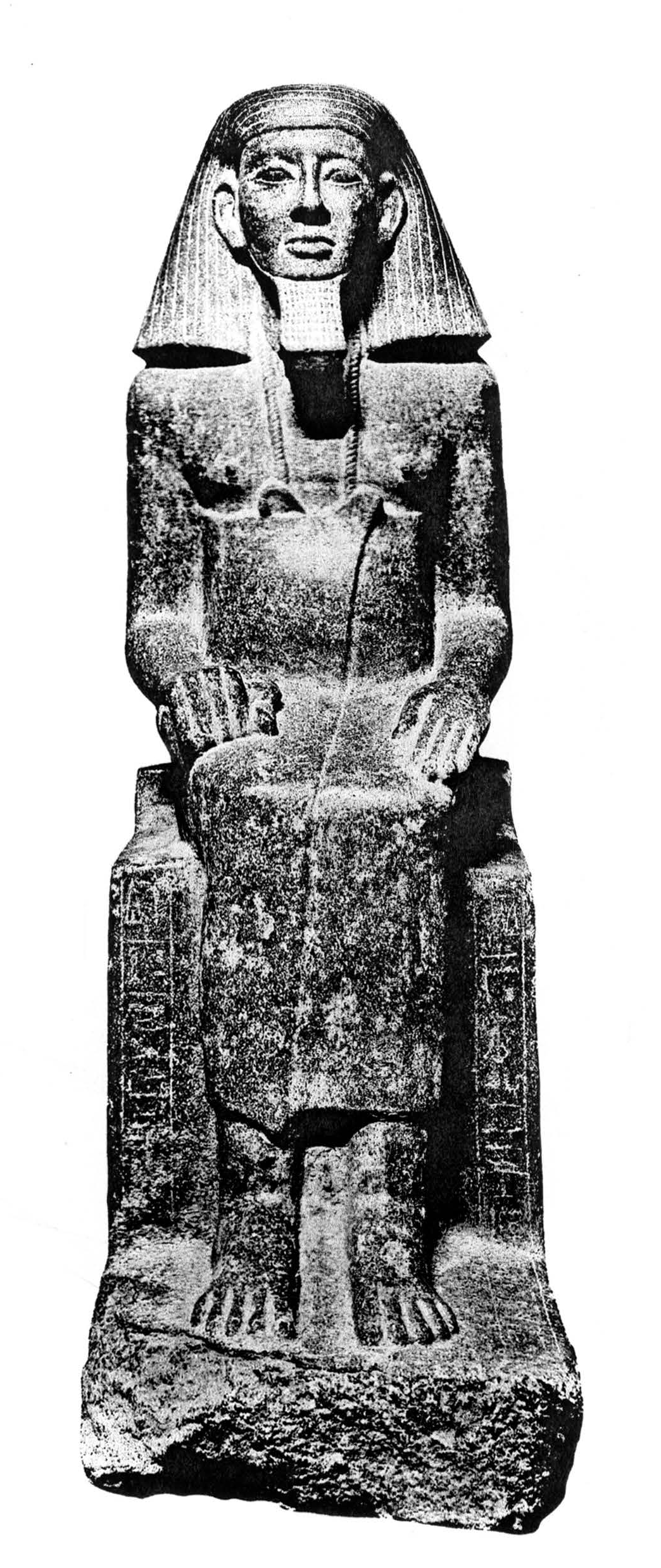
Zamonth, likely Ankhu's father (CG42034).

=== Parentage ===
Ankhu was the son of a vizier. Labib Habachi proposed that his father was the vizier Zamonth who served under king Amenemhat III in the Late Twelfth Dynasty. The mother of Ankhu is known as Henutpu, the name of Zamonth's wife is published as Henut. Habachi wonders whether Henut is a mistake or a short version of Henutpu. The name Henut is otherwise not attested. Detlef Franke agreed with this identification and calculates that Ankhu must have been 50 to 60 years old under king Khendjer.

=== Wife and Children ===
Ankhu was married to a woman called Mereret.

Ankhu was the father of two further viziers: Resseneb and Iymeru. The family formed a strong dynasty of high court officials.

A daughter was called Senebhenas. She was married to the overseer of the half domain Wepwawethotep (Franke PD 207), son of haty-aa Khnumhotep. They had a daughter nšmt-ḥtp.tj. Wepwawethotep was related to Queen Aya, albeit it remains uncertain in which way.

== Biography ==
Ankhu is known from monuments dating to the early 13th Dynasty. He is indirectly associated with Sobekhotep II and possibly Khendjer. There are several references between Ankhu and Sobekhotep II, latest at his burial site at Dra Abu el-Naga. Khendjer may have ruled at the same time further north.

Ankhu appears in the Papyrus Boulaq 18 as the head of the court officials. The papyrus may date to the reign of Sobekhotep II, or according to an analysis of the document by Kim Ryholt, it may date to the reign of Imyremeshaw or Sehetepkare Intef. The papyrus mentions a Queen Aya, whose image appears also on a stela which shows that she was part of Ankhu's family. A stela found at Abydos dated to the reign of Khendjer reports on building works at the Osiris temple. In the Amun temple at Karnak he erected statues of himself, his father and his mother. The latter is one of the very few statues belonging to a woman placed in this temple.

== Attestations ==
Several items associated with Ankhu are grouped in 13th Dyn. Theban Workshop 2.

=== Papyrus Boulaq 18 ===
The Papyrus Boulaq 18 was found in two fragments which mentions Vizier Ankhu.

The larger manuscript is an account of income and expenses as the Court visited the Southern City, dated to Year 3, 2-3 Month of Akhet (Inundation) of an unnamed king.

The smaller manuscript is an account made by Neferhotep. It mentions Great Scribe of the Vizier Resseneb and the Estate of the Vizier Ankhu with entries dating from a period in Year 6, 1 Peret to 2 Shemu.

=== Papyrus Brooklyn 35.1446 ===
The Papyrus Brooklyn 35.1446 mentions Vizier Ankhu. This papyrus consist of several entries, the first being a list of fugitives from labor duty at the Great Enclosure dated to Year 36 of an unnamed king thought to be Amenemhat III. The last entry is a list of servants dated to Year 1-2 of Sobekhotep III.

The Papyrus Brooklyn 35.1446 Insertion B mentions an unnamed Reporter of the Southern City ([wḥmw] n njwt rsj (...)) and Ankhu with the titles Overseer of the City, Vizier, Overseer of the Six Great Courts ([jmj-rꜣ] njwt; ṯꜣtj; jmj-rꜣ ḥwt-wrt 6 ꜥnḫw).

The Papyrus Brooklyn 35.1446 Insertion C is dated to Year 6 of an unnamed king. It mentions an unnamed Reporter of the Southern City (wḥmw n njwt rsj), an unnamed Sealbearer of the King and Overseer of the Field of the Southern City (ḫtmw-bjtj; jmj-rꜣ ꜣḥwt n njwt rst [...]-ꜥw) and Ankhu with the titles Overseer of the City, Vizier, Overseer of the Six Great Courts (jmj-rꜣ njwt; ṯꜣtj; jmj-rꜣ ḥwt-wrt 6 ꜥnḫw).

=== Stela, Louvre C12 ===
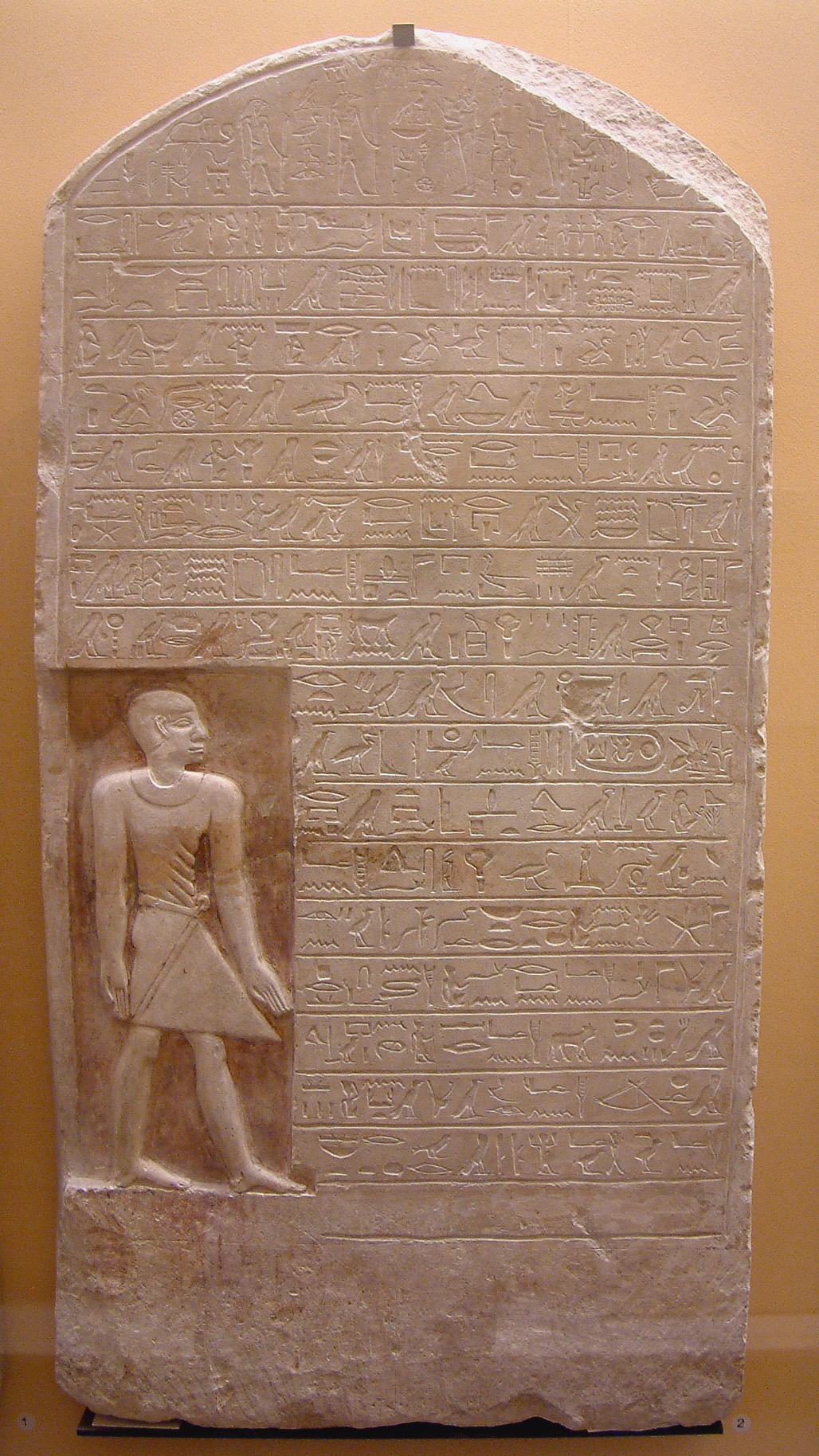
Louvre C12

At Abydos, a Stele of Amenyseneb mentions vizier Ankhu. This is notable, because another Stele of Amenyseneb (C11) can be associated with Khendjer.

Translation: (2) An offering that the king gives to Osiris, who is in charge of the westerners, great god, lord of Abydos to give an invocation of offerings of bread, milk, oxen, birds, glory and power (3) in the necropolis for the ka of the administrator of the phylum of priests of Abydos, Amenyseneb, justified, whom W'emkau fathered, (4) to whom the lady of the house Nebetit gave birth. He says: The vizier's scribe Seneb (cf. Resseneb), son of the vizier, came to (5) notify me (with) a message from the vizier. so I went with him (6) and I found the overseer of the city and vizier Ankhu in his office. Then he gave an officer a commission (7) to me saying: Behold, it is commanded that you have the temple of Abydos cleansed. They will be given (8) to you craftsmen for their execution and priests of the temples of this district and of the granary of (9) divine offerings. So I have made it clean from bottom to top and on its walls on the outside (10) and inside; painters fill with paints on the pictures and on the plaster (11) renewing what the king of Upper and Lower Egypt Kheperkare did, justified. So 'the shining protector' (12) traveled to take his throne in this temple and the deputy overseer of the treasury Sa-inheret accompanied (13) him. Then he thanked me much more than all things saying: 'May he be prosperous who has done this for (14) his God. So he gave me an amount of 10 debens equipped with date cakes and half a veal. So (15) a cabin officer traveled north. The works were then inspected. (16) Then he rejoiced over it much more than over all things. - From Spanish translation by Ángel Sánchez Rodríguez

== Burial ==
At the Dra Abu el-Naga (Thebes), the Shaft Tomb of Ankhu was found in 2023, at a family necropolis with 30 shaft tombs dating to the early Thirteenth Dynasty. Inside was a 10-ton pink granite sarcophagus with his name. In another of the shaft tombs was a funerary stela belonging to a deputy minister, which had the cartouche of Sobekhotep II.

== See other contemporaries ==
=== Royals ===
- Aya (queen)
- Khendjer, indirectly via the official Amenyseneb.

=== Officials ===
- Aabeni (high steward)
- Sa-inheret (deputy overseer of the treasury)
- Seneb (scribe of the vizier, son of the vizier; cf. Resseneb). At Mirgissa, attested by a seal impression (Mirgissa 3-182 (Q 279)).
- Amenyseneb (administrator of the phylum of priests of Abydos) also contemporary with king Khendjer.
- Sihathor, House Official of Vizier Ankhu (Leiden AP 48).

== Speculations ==
Ankhu served at least under two, perhaps even under five, kings of the 13th Dynasty. His situation illustrates that during this period the viziers were the real power behind weak kings. The kings were only in power for a short period, while the viziers remained in power for longer periods.
