= Iymeru (son of Ankhu) =

Egyptian vizier

- Vizier of Egypt
- Statuette of Iymeru at the Museo Egizio, Turin
- Predecessor: Resseneb
- Successor: Neferkare Iymeru
- Dynasty: 13th Dynasty
- Pharaoh: Khendjer, Imyremeshaw(?)
- Father: Ankhu
- Mother: Mereret

Iymeru was an ancient Egyptian vizier in office during the 13th Dynasty.

== Biography ==
Iymeru was a son of the better known vizier Ankhu, along with his brother and predecessor Resseneb. According to Wolfram Grajetzki, both the two brothers probably enjoyed a brief office as vizier because they are both poorly attested. Other sources suggest instead that Iymeru officiated during the reigns of pharaohs Khendjer, his successor Imyremeshaw and maybe even beyond.

Iymeru is attested, along with Resseneb and Ankhu, on a stela now in Cairo Museum (CG 20690). There also exist a small granodiorite statue of him, of unknown provenance, and now exhibited at the Museo Egizio in Turin (inv. no. S. 1220): on it, is specifically stated that he is the son of Ankhu. The original head of the statue was lost, and replaced with another one stylistically datable to the later New Kingdom. The replacement probably occurred during the 19th century, when such "restorations" were common measures.
