= Amenyseneb =

Official in the late Middle Kingdom of Egypt

- Regulator of a watch at Abydos
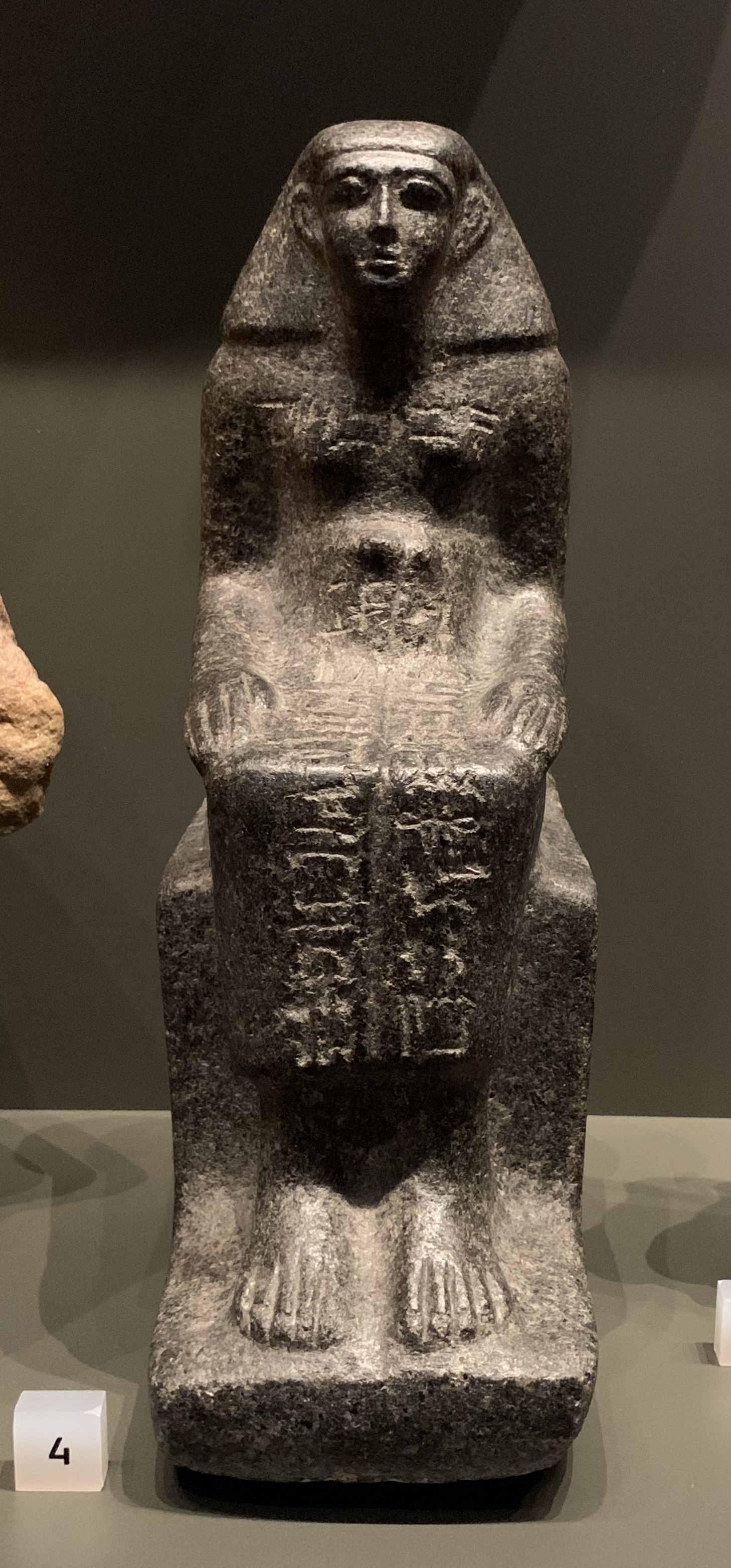
- Dynasty: 13th Dynasty
- Pharaoh: Khendjer
- Father: W'emkau
- Mother: Lady of the House, Nebet-iti/Nebet-Itef

Amenyseneb was the Controller of a Phyle or Regulator of a Watch at Abydos during the early 13th Dynasty in the late Middle Kingdom of Egypt. While he was an official of lower rank, his attestations binds important persons like king Khendjer and vizier Ankhu in time.

He is not to be confused with Amenyseneb, Governor of Elephantine, dated to the same period.

== Early life ==
Amenyseneb was the son of W'emkau and born to Nebetitef. His siblings were Sainheret and Nebetaneheh. Seinheret may have become Deputy Overseer of the Treasurer.

== Attestations ==
Amenyseneb is attested by several important Egyptian artworks.

=== Stela, Liverpool GM E.30 ===
At Abydos, a limestone rectangular stela inscribed on both sides. The stela has unusual features like a large ankh sign in the middle, and being inscribed and decorated on both sides.

=== Stela, Louvre C11 ===
Stele of Amenyseneb mentioning king Khendjer.

Translation: (17) The good god, lord of the Two Lands, lord of action, the king of Upper and Lower Egypt, Nimaaenkare? (n-mAa-n-xa-ra), may he be given life forever!, the son of Ra of his body, Khendjer, may he be given life (18) eternally, stability and dominance!. It is entrusted [1] to the administrator of the phylum of priests of Abydos, Amenyseneb, justified, (19) saying: 'Look, we have seen the work you have done. May the sovereign favor you, may he favor (20) to you his ka and make your old age beautiful in the temple of your (21) god'. Then it was ordered to give me the hindquarters of a calf. Then (22) He charged me saying: 'Carry out all the investigations of what is in the temple.' (23) I was acting according to everything that had been ordered. I have had the chapels restored (24) all of all the gods that are in the temple, that they be renewed (01) their altars and the cedar of the great altar that is in their presence. (02) I was managing My wish was beneficial to my god and the sovereign was favoring me. - From spanish translation by Ángel Sánchez Rodríguez

=== Stela, Louvre C12 ===
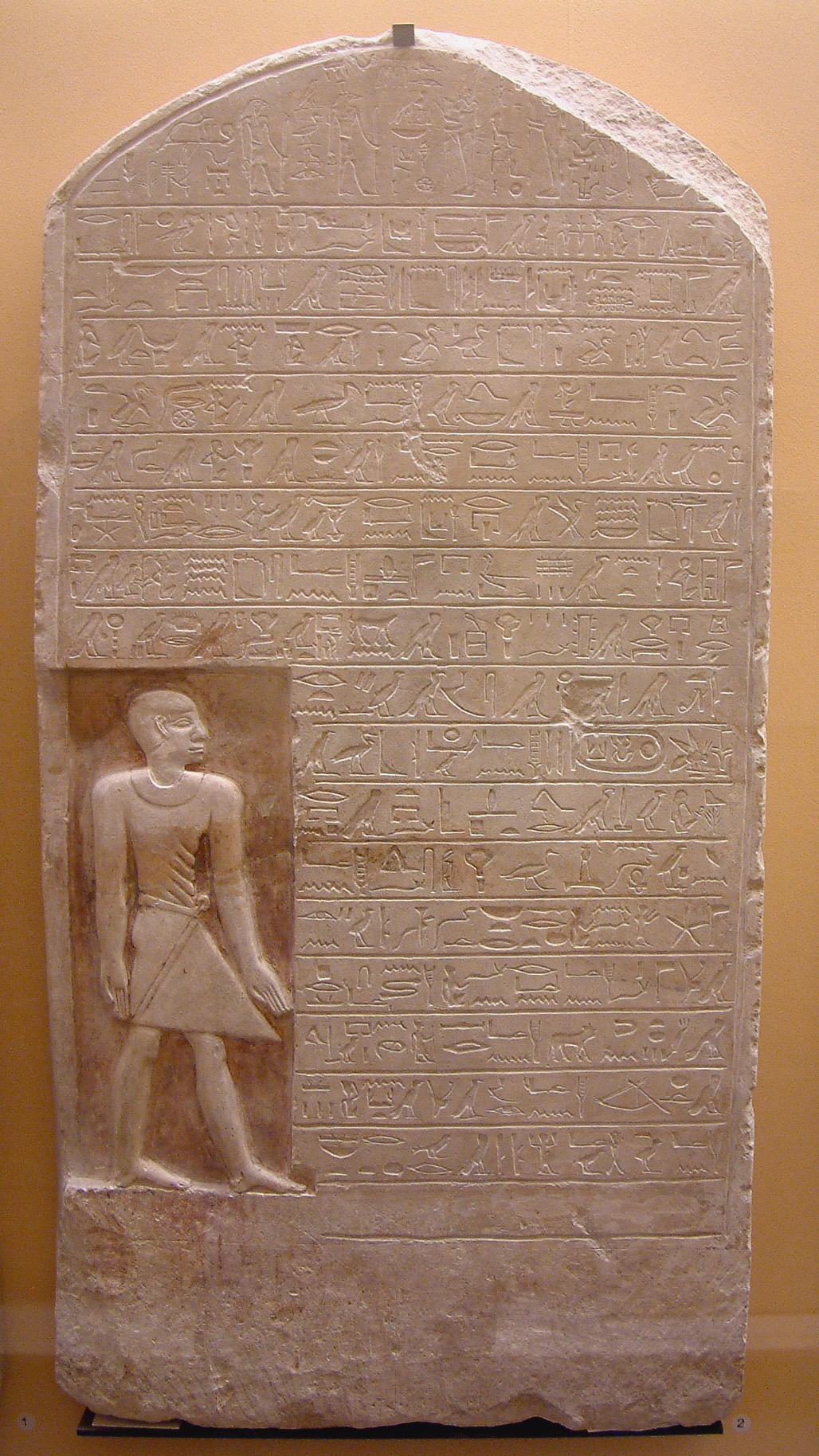
Louvre C12

Stele of Amenyseneb mentioning vizier Ankhu.

Translation: (2) An offering that the king gives to Osiris, who is in charge of the westerners, great god, lord of Abydos to give an invocation of offerings of bread, milk, oxen, birds, glory and power (3) in the necropolis for the ka of the administrator of the phylum of priests of Abydos, Amenyseneb, justified, whom W'emkau fathered, (4) to whom the lady of the house Nebetit gave birth. He says: The vizier's scribe Seneb (cf. Resseneb), son of the vizier, came to (5) notify me (with) a message from the vizier. so i went with him (6) and I found the overseer of the city and vizier Ankhu in his office. Then he gave an officer a commission (7) to me saying: Behold, it is commanded that you have the temple of Abydos cleansed. They will be given (8) to you craftsmen for their execution and priests of the temples of this district and of the granary of (9) divine offerings. So I have made it clean from bottom to top and on its walls on the outside (10) and inside; painters fill with paints on the pictures and on the plaster (11) renewing what the king of Upper and Lower Egypt Kheperkare did, justified. So 'the shining protector' (12) traveled to take his throne in this temple and the deputy overseer of the treasury Sa-inheret accompanied (13) him. Then he thanked me much more than all things saying: 'May he be prosperous who has done this for (14) his God. So he gave me an amount of 10 debens equipped with date cakes and half a veal. So (15) a cabin officer traveled north. The works were then inspected (16) Then he rejoiced over it much more than over all things. - From spanish translation by Ángel Sánchez Rodríguez

=== Seated statue, Edinburgh A.1951.345 (weak) ===
At Abydos, a granite seated statue of Amenyseneb. This statue has the same name, title and location as the main person, but the link has not been confirmed.
