= SAK S 3 =

Coordinates: 29°50′02.30″N 31°13′25.59″E

- Constructed: 13th Dynasty
- Material: mud brick
- Base: 55 m x 55 m

SAK S 3 (Saqqara South 3) is the provisional, modern name of an Egyptian pyramid, which was discovered north of the Pyramid of Khendjer in spring 2006 during a field survey in Saqqara south. The structure appears on some old maps as a hill, without being identified as a pyramid. It is dated with some certainty to the Thirteenth Dynasty.

== Structure ==
The outline of the pyramid indicates a base measuring 55 metres x 55 metres – about 100 royal cubits. This is a common size for pyramids of the Thirteenth Dynasty. Within the pyramid area is a rectangular pit measuring about 20 x 25 metres, in which the substructure of the pyramid would have been. The entrance to the pit was on the eastern side. The pit is surrounded by piles of rubble which are up to two metres tall and contain limestone fragments and remains of mudbricks. The finds suggests that the construction of the pyramid was abandoned shortly after construction began.

== Owner and date ==
Since the pyramid has not yet been systematically excavated, no conclusions can be offered about its owner. Pottery finds in the surrounding area date to the Thirteenth Dynasty.

== Bibliography ==
- Robert Schiestl. "Neues zur Residenznekropole der 13. Dynastie." Sokar. No. 13, 2006, p. 47.
- Nicole Alexanian, Robert Schiestl, Stephan Johannes Seidlmayer. The Necropolis of Dahshur Third Excavation Report Spring 2006. Freie Universität Berlin, Berlin 2006, p. 13 (Full text PDF; 3.1 MB).
