= Seth Meribre =

Ancient Egyptian sovereign

- Seth Merybre, Set
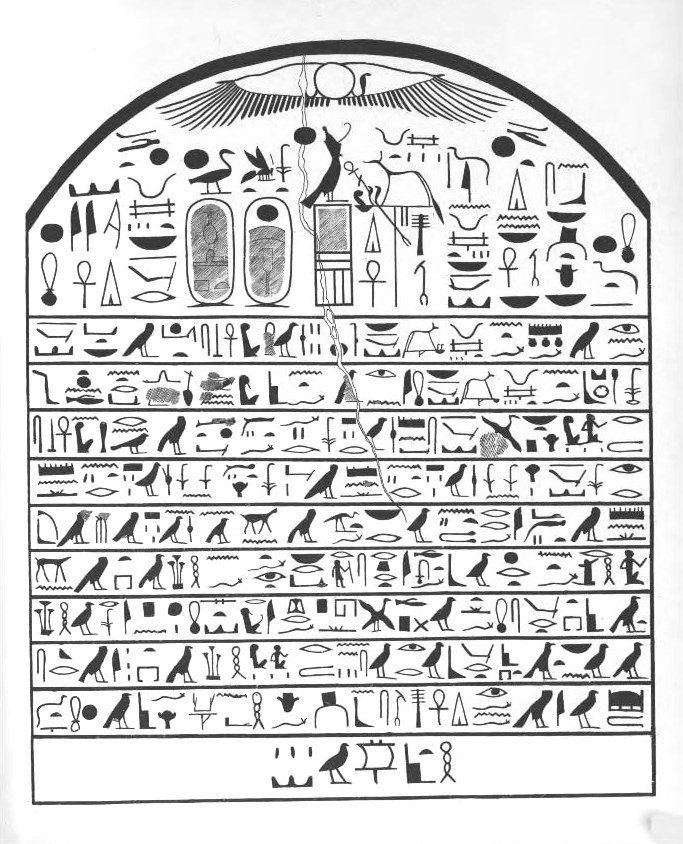
- Usurped stele which Ryholt attributed to Seth Meribre (Cairo JE 35256)

Pharaoh
- Reign: x years, x months, and 6 days less than 10 years, probably less than 5 years, ending 1749 BC
- Predecessor: Sehetepkare Intef
- Successor: Sobekhotep III
Royal titulary
Prenomen
Meribre
Mr-ib-Rˁ
He who is beloved by the heart of Ra
M23 t L2 t < ra U7 F34 >
Turin canon
Seth Meribre
Stš-mr-ib-Rˁ
Seth, he who is beloved by the heart of Ra
< HASH F34 Z1 G7 C7 G7 >
- Dynasty: 13th Dynasty

Seth Meribre was an Ancient Egyptian king during the early 13th Dynasty during the late Middle Kingdom.

== Attestations ==
Seth Meribre is only attested in the Turin King List dating to the time of Ramesses II. There is no certain contemporary evidence of this king, except for two speculative suggestions. The lack of archaeological evidence would indicate his reign was very short.

=== Stela, Abydos JE 35256 (weak) ===
At Abydos, a stele dated to a regnal Year 4 and dedicated to preserving the procession road in the area of Wepwawet was usurped by Neferhotep I in the mid-late 13th Dynasty. Anthony Leahy (1989) suggested the stele had been usurped from Wegaf. Von Beckerath (1965:56) suggested Sobekhotep III. Ryholt (1997) argued that the stele was taken from Meribre Seth.

=== Lintel, Medamud JE 44944 (weak) ===
At Medamud, a temple has yielded many ruined structures and architectural remains. Some may have been erected by Seth Meribre, but were subsequently usurped by his successor Sobekhotep III. In particular, a lintel from Medamud and now in the Egyptian Museum, JE 44944, bears almost-erased signs corresponding to Seth Meribre's nomen.

=== Architectural elements, Medamud JE 13891 (weak) ===
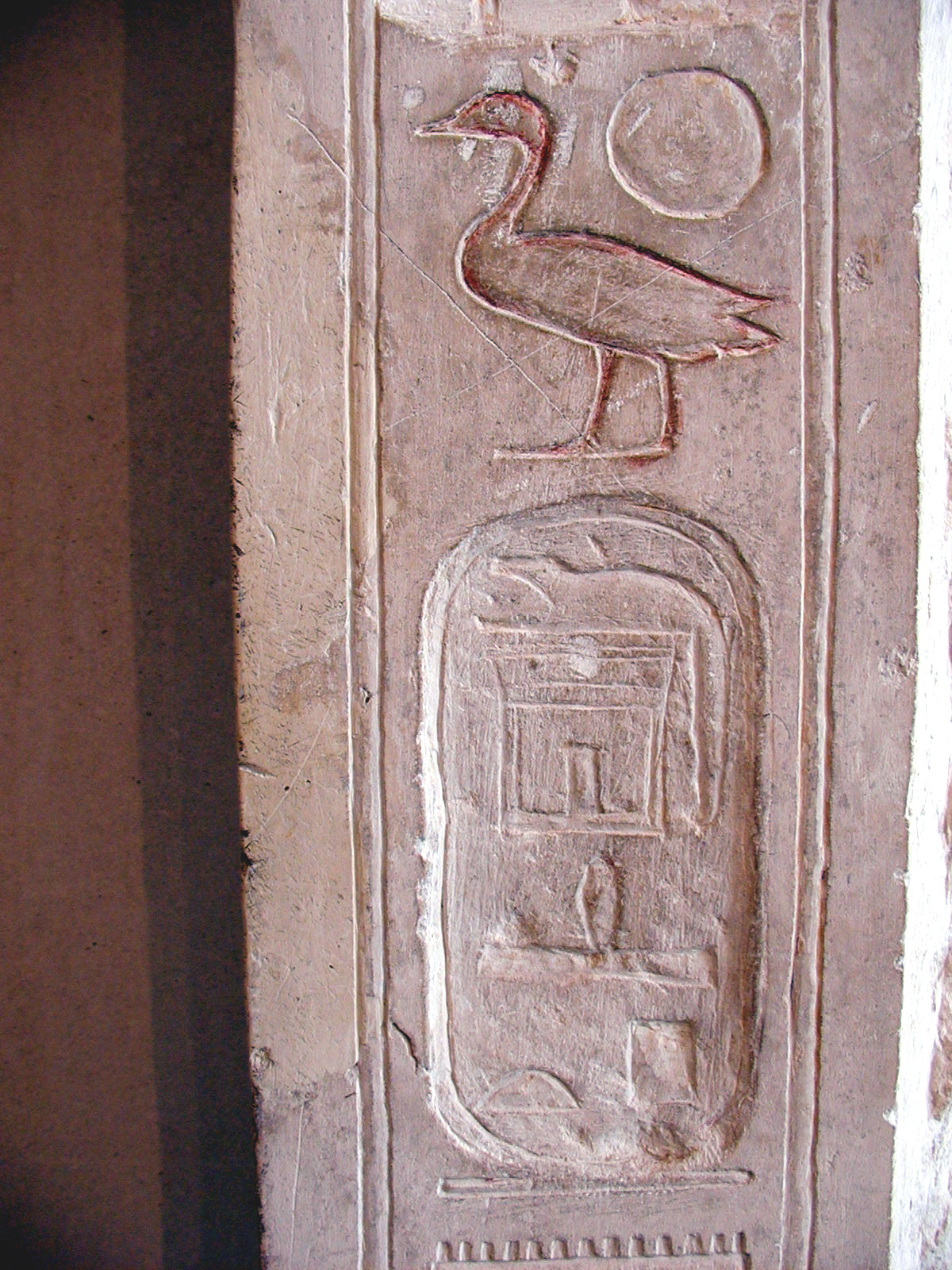
Louvre E 13891 with Cartouche of Sobekhotep III, but may have been usurped from Seth Meribre.

At Medamud, architectural elements may have been erected by Seth Meribre, but were subsequently usurped by his successor Sobekhotep III.

=== Non-Contemporary Attestation ===
==== Turin King List ====
The Turin King List 7:23 (Alan Gardiner and Jürgen von Beckerath: col. 6 row 23) mentions "The Dual King Meribra Seth ... 6 days". He is preceded by Sehotepkara Intef (7:22) and succeeded by Sekhemre Wadjtawy Sobekhotep (7:24). The duration of Seth Meribre's reign is lost in a lacuna of the Turin canon, except for the end "... [and] 6 days".

== Theories ==
The Egyptologists Darrell Baker and Kim Ryholt place Seth Meribre as the twenty-fourth ruler of the 13th Dynasty, while Jürgen von Beckerath sees him as the twentieth king. These authors agree, however, that Seth Meribre probably usurped the throne at the expense of his predecessor, Sehetepkare Intef.

Kim Ryholt gives a total of 10 years for the combined reigns of Imyremeshaw, Sehetepkare Intef and Seth Meribre. Furthermore, following Papyrus Boulaq 18, there are reasons to believe that either Imyremeshaw or Sehetepkare Intef reigned for over five years, thus leaving less than 5 years to Seth Meribre.

Jürgen von Beckerath believes that Seth Meribre can be identified with a king mentioned on Genealogy of Ankhefensekhmet of the much later 22nd Dynasty. This king bears the name "Aaqen", literally The donkey is strong. Von Beckerath proposes that this refers to Seth Meribre and that the name originally was "Sethqen", that is, Seth is strong. Indeed, since the god Seth had been ostracized during the 22nd Dynasty, the hieroglyph of the Seth-animal had been replaced by the hieroglyph of the donkey, yielding "Aaqen".

Seth Meribre may have been the twenty-fourth pharaoh and reigned from Memphis, ending in 1749 BC or c. 1700 BC. The length of his reign is not known for certain; the Egyptologist Kim Ryholt proposes that he reigned for a short time, certainly less than ten years.

Preceded by Sehetepkare Intef	Pharaoh of Egypt; Thirteenth Dynasty	Succeeded by Sobekhotep III
