= Aya (queen) =

Ancient Egyptian queen consort

Aya was an ancient Egyptian king's wife of the early Thirteenth Dynasty (between 1803 and 1649 BCE).

i A1 i i
Aya
in hieroglyphs
Era: Middle Kingdom
(2055–1650 BC)

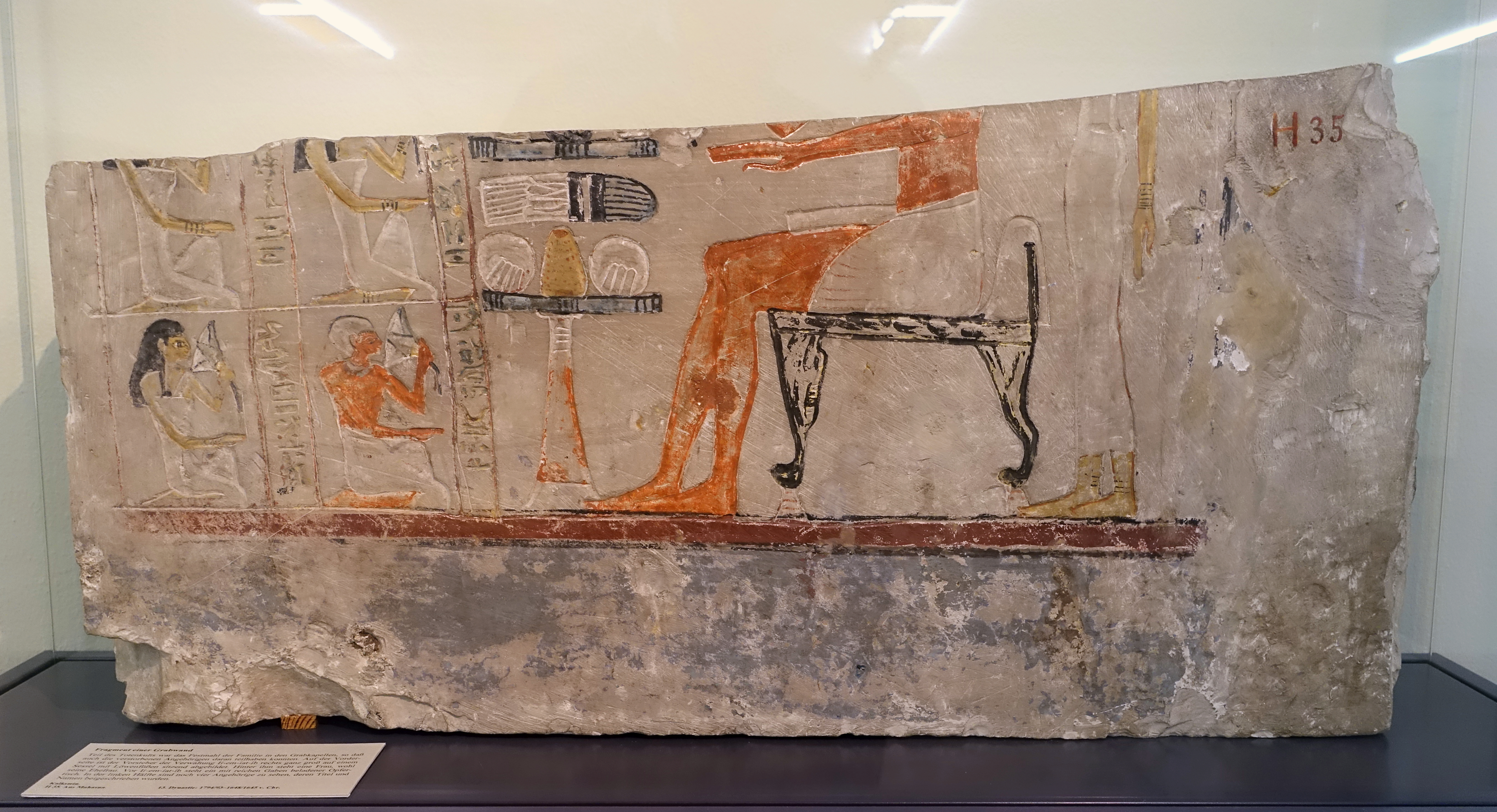
Stela mentioning queen Aya

== Attestations ==
She is known from two sources. She can be associated with vizier Ankhu.

=== Würzburg Martin von Wagner Museum H 35 ===
At Abydos, Aya appears on a stela now in Würzburg. From this source it is clear that she was part of an influential family of high court officials and was related to the Vizier . Importantly, is a certain Royal Scribe and Overseer of a Half-Domain, Wepwawethotep {ḫtmw-bjtj; jmj-rꜣ gs-pr wp-wꜣwt-ḥtp}, who married Senebhenas, daughter of Vizier Ankhu.

=== Papyrus Boulaq 18 ===
She appears in the Papyrus Boulaq 18. This is an administrative account belonging to the Theban palace of a Thirteenth Dynasty king. It was found in the tomb of the scribe of the great enclosure Neferhotep. The name of the king in this papyrus is only partly preserved.

High officials mentioned in this text includes Vizier Ankhu and High Steward Aabeni.

=== Speculations ===
Many scholars read the remains of the king's name in the Papyrus Boulaq 18 as Sekhemre Khutawy Sobekhotep. However, the reading is disputed and other suggestions include King Sehetepkare Intef and King Imyremeshaw. Therefore, there is some doubt over the identification of Aya's husband.
