= Zamonth =

Egyptian vizier

Samontu (Zamonth)
- Vizier of Egypt
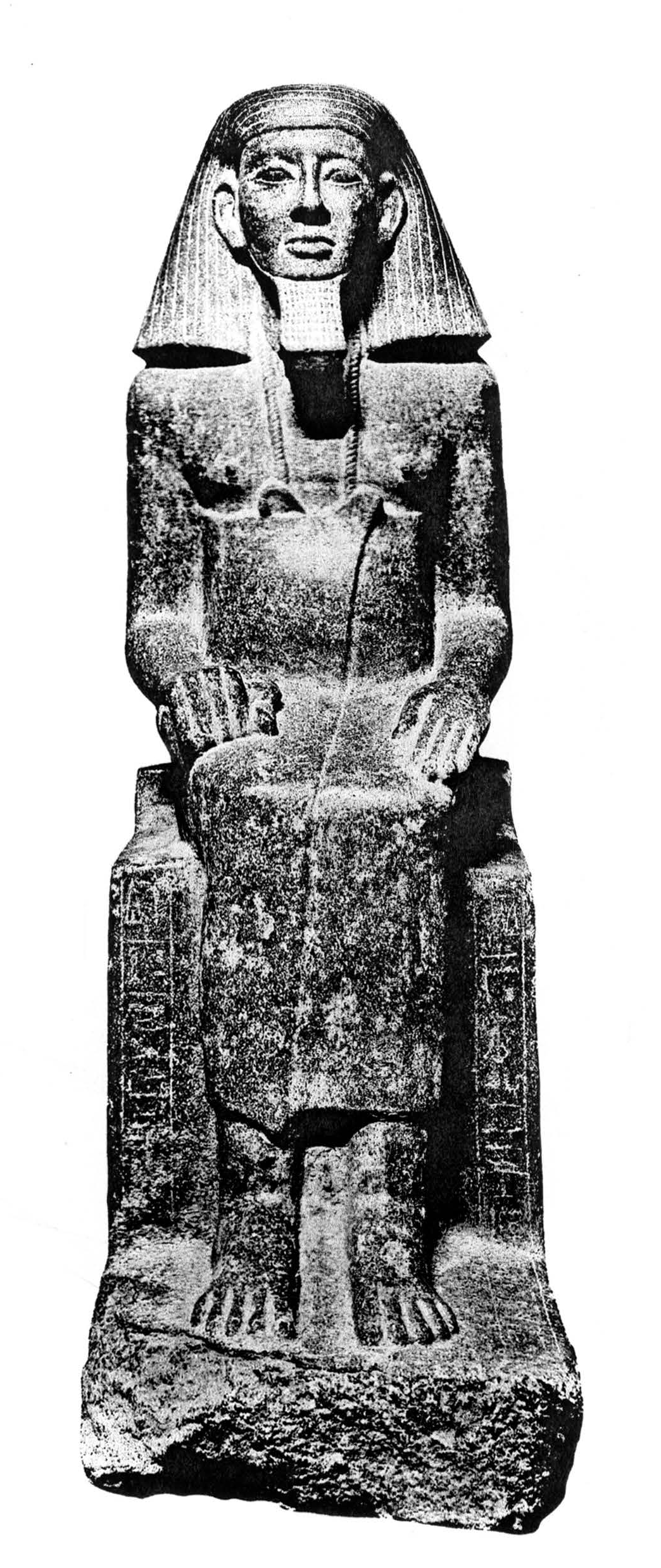
- Statue of Ankhu's father, an unnamed vizier; he may have been Zamonth indeed.
Egyptian name
mn n T G39
- Successor: Ankhu (son)?
- Dynasty: Late 12th Dynasty; Early 13th Dynasty
- Pharaoh: Amenemhat III
- Spouse: Henutpu
- Mother: Zatip
- Children: Senebtifi (son); Seneb (daughter); Ankhu (son)?

Samontu (or Zamonth) was an ancient Egyptian vizier who is thought to have been in office during the reign of Amenemhat III, at the end of the Twelfth Dynasty and early Thirteenth Dynasty, during the Middle Kingdom period.

== Family ==
The name Samontu (Egyptian Sꜣ-Mnṯw) is a theophoric name consisting of the elements Sa (son) + Montu (the god of war Montu), referring to the Middle Kingdom warrior deity. The name appears in several transliteration variants, including Samonth or the older variations Zamont, and Zamonth. Wolfram Grajetzki also refer to him as Zamont Resseneb, with his grandson being Resseneb.

Samontu was the son of [unknown father] and born to Lady of the House (nbt pr), Zatip (sꜣt-jpj).

Samontu married Henutpu (ḥnwt⸗j-pw), daughter of [unknown parents]. They had several children.

- Senebtifi (son). The stela of Zamonth shows his son standing opposite him. The inscriptions identify him as the royal sealer and priest of Amun Senebtifi.
- Seneb (daughter) with not additional titles.
- Ankhu (son), a vizier, may have been a son of Zamonth. The wife of Zamonth is called Henutpu, while the mother of Ankhu bore the name Henut, possibly a diminutif. In addition, it is known that Ankhu was the son of a vizier.

== Career ==
If inscriptions with the name Samontu refer to the same person, then he may have held the office as Mouth of Nekhen early in his career and later become vizier.

=== Mouth of Nekhen ===
In Lower Nubia, a mouth of Nekhen Samontu with the same mother is known from several rock inscriptions. They date to the years 6 and 9 of king Amenemhat III and report a small military campaign against Nubia. It seems likely that both sources refer to the same person, and that they belong to the time before Samontu was promoted to the position of a vizier.

=== Vizier ===
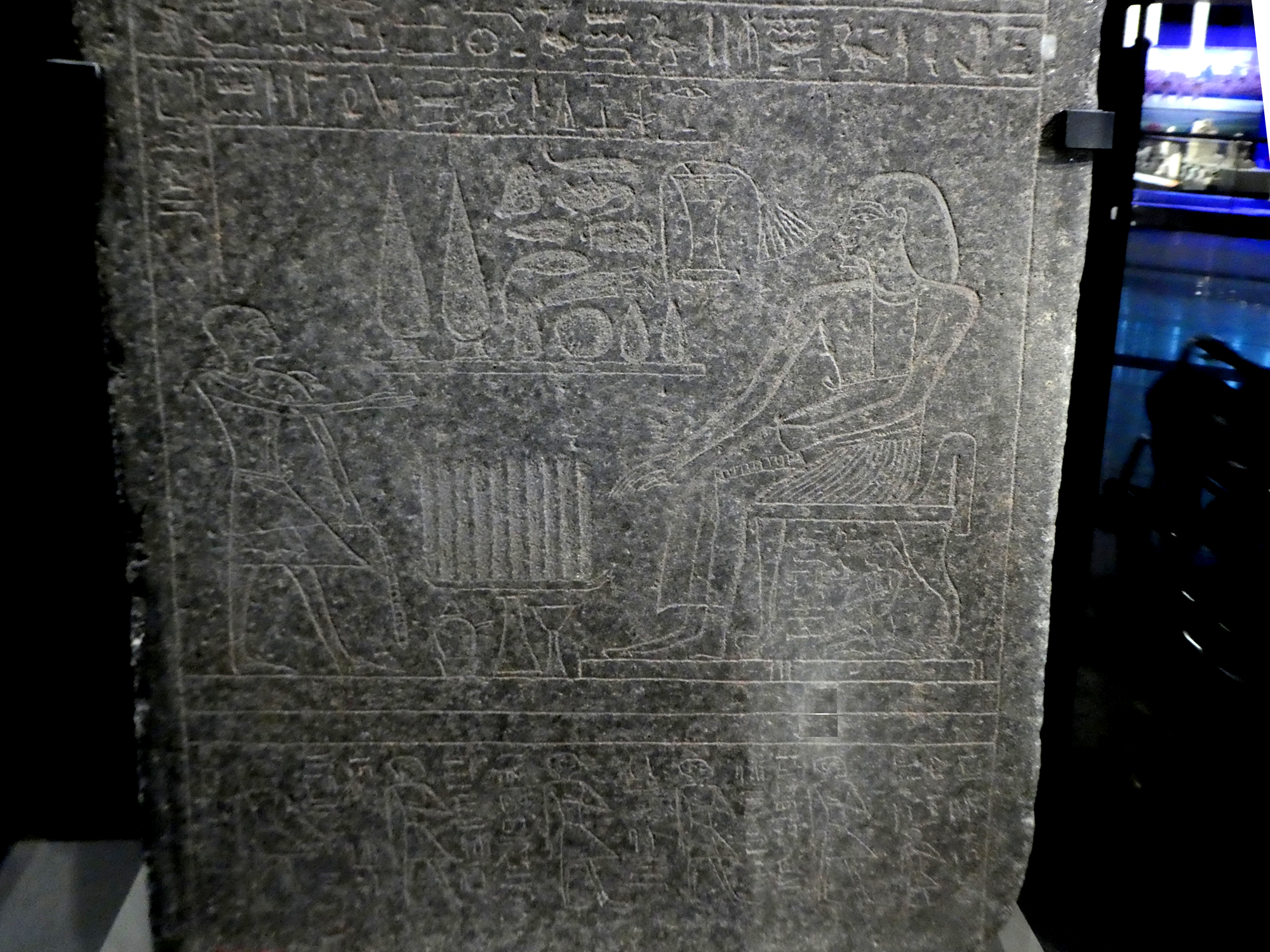
Stela of Zamonth, CGC 20102

At Abydos (North Cemetery), the granite round-topped Stela of Zamonth show him sitting in front of an offering table. The stela with iconography to the god Amun was most likely made in a workshop at Thebes. He bears the titles member of the elite, mayor. overseer of the city and vizier (jrj-pꜥt; ḥꜣtj-ꜥ; jmj-rꜣ njwt; ṯꜣtj sꜣ-mnṯw). The stela is now on display in the Grand Egyptian Museum (before in the Egyptian Museum) of Cairo.

The stela also mentions several servants of the vizier, such as the Overseer of Estate, Renseneb, Reporter of the Vizier Senusret, Interior Overseer of the Bureau of the Vizier, Amenemhat etc.

At Thebes, the Statue of a Vizier, father of Vizier Ankhu, thought to be Samontu with the title string jrj-pꜥt; ḥꜣtj-ꜥ; ḫtmw-bjtj; smr-wꜥtj [...].

== Attestations ==
Samontu (PD 526) is known from several attestations.

- Stela Cairo CG 20102 with high title, wife's name.
- Statue Cairo CG42034 with high title, wife's name and son Ankhu.
- Seal/sealing Leiden F 2015/9.515 as overseer of the city and vizier.
- Stela Mariemont B.422 with name, high title and mother's name.
- Stela BM EA 1290 (weak) different title, name and mother's name.
- Inscribed surface FSN 495 (weak) different title, name and mother's name.
- Inscribed surface FSN 498 (weak) different title, name and mother's name.
- Inscribed surface FSN 499 (weak) different title, name and mother's name.
- Hieratix text Semna Despatch 6 (weak) different title, name and mother's name.

== Other sources ==
An offering chapel of Senwosret (Vienna AS 198), a reporter of the vizier, may belong to a servant of Zamonth. A person with the same name and title is mentioned on the Stela in Cairo (CG 20102).
