= Pyramid of Khendjer =

Pyramid built c. 1760 BC in Saqqara, Egypt

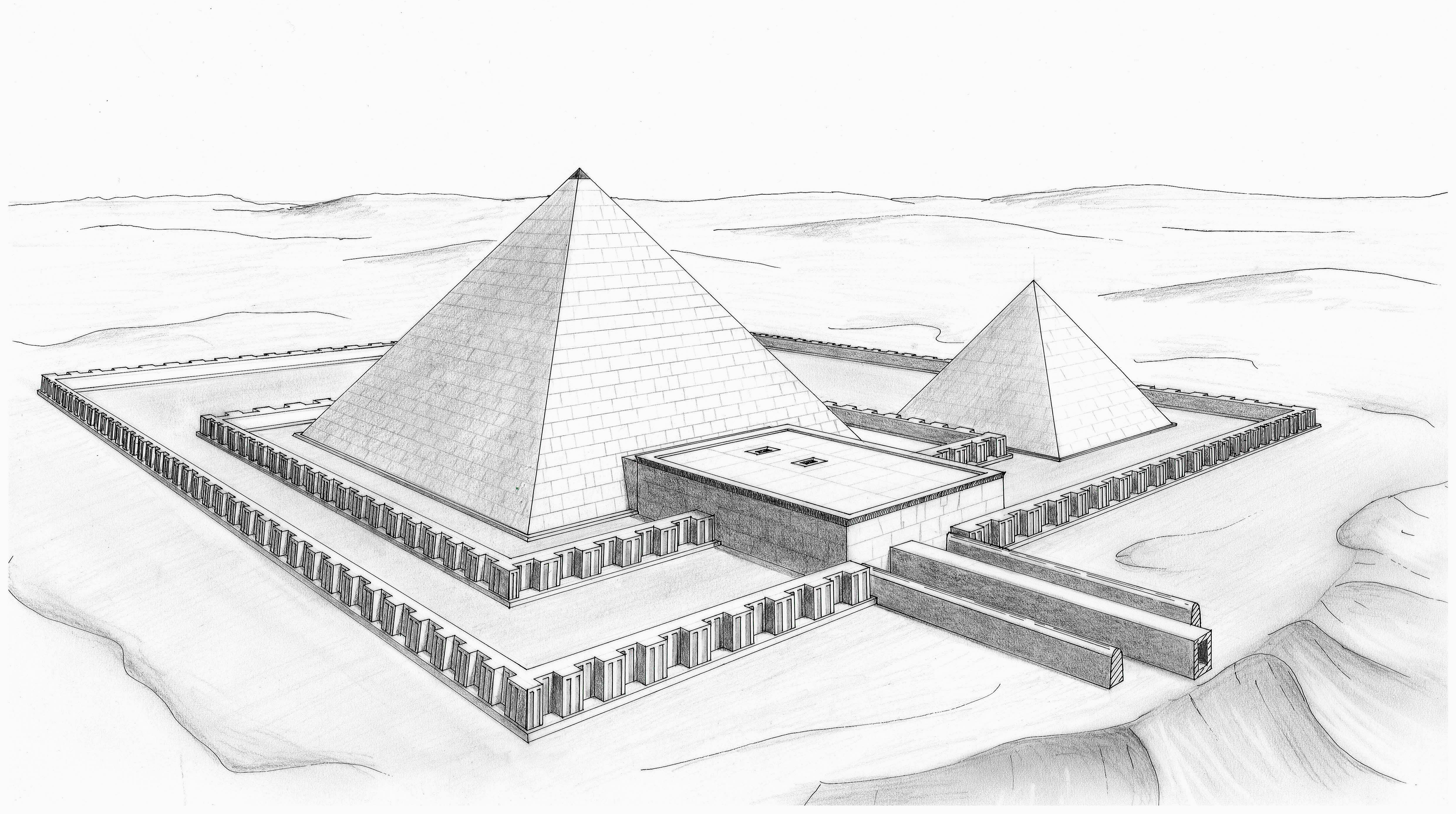
- Reconstruction of the pyramid complex of Khendjer.

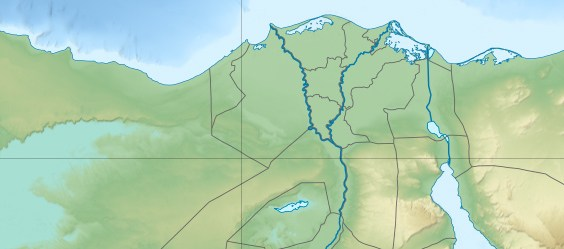
- Location within Lower Egypt
- 29°49′56″N 31°13′26″E
- Owner: Khendjer, 13th Dynasty
- Constructed: c. 1760 BC
- Type: True pyramid (now ruined)
- Material: Mudbrick core with limestone casing
- Height: 37.35 m (122.5 ft), now 1 m (3.3 ft)
- Base: 52.5 m (172 ft)
- Volume: 34,315 m^{3} (44,882 cu yd)
- Slope: 55°

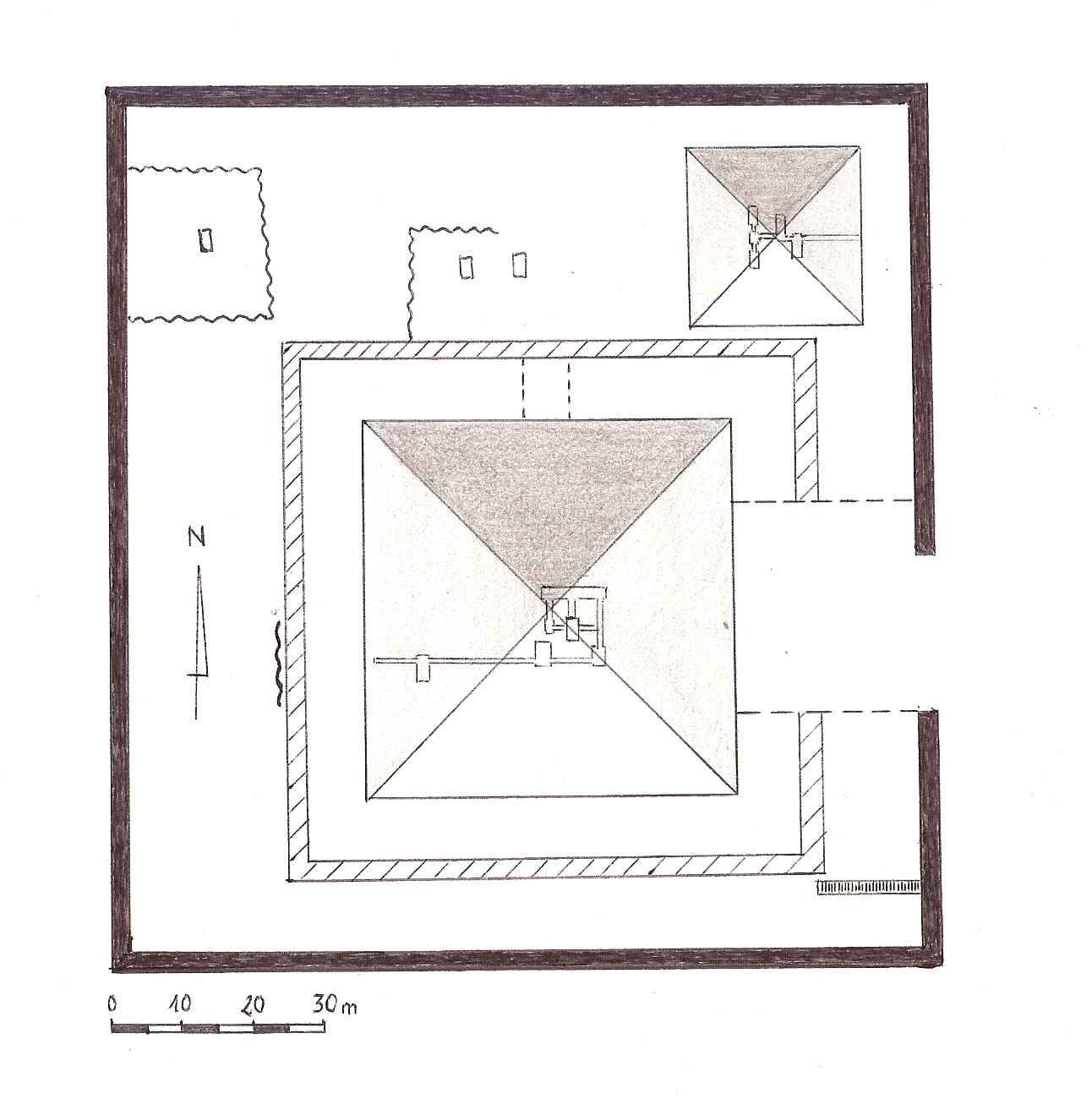
Plan of the Pyramid Complex

The pyramid of Khendjer was a pyramid built for the burial of the 13th dynasty pharaoh Khendjer, who ruled Egypt c. 1760 BC during the Second Intermediate Period. The pyramid, which is part of larger complex comprising a mortuary temple, a chapel, two enclosure walls and a subsidiary pyramid, originally stood around 37 m (121 ft) high and is now completely ruined. The pyramidion was discovered during excavations under the direction of Gustave Jéquier in 1929, indicating that the pyramid was finished during Khendjer's lifetime. It is the only pyramid known to have been completed during the 13th Dynasty.

== Excavations ==
The first investigations of the pyramid of Khendjer were undertaken in the mid 19th century by Karl Richard Lepsius, who included the pyramid in his list under the number XLIV. The pyramid was excavated by Gustave Jéquier from 1929 until 1931 with the excavation report published two years later in 1933.

== Pyramid complex ==
In South Saqqara, the pyramid complex of Khendjer is located between the pyramid of Pepi II and the pyramid of Senusret III. The main pyramid currently lies in ruins, due in part to the damaging excavations by G. Jéquier and now rises only about one meter above the desert sand.

=== Enclosure walls ===
The pyramid complex comprises the main pyramid enclosed by two walls. The outer one, made of mudbrick, contained in the north-east corner a small subsidiary pyramid, the only one known dating to the 13th dynasty. The inner enclosure wall was made of limestone and patterned with niches and panels. This replaced an earlier mudbrick wavy-wall, which led Rainer Stadelmann to suggest that the wavy-wall was constructed as a provisional and abbreviated substitute to the more time consuming but preferred niched-wall. At the south-east corner of the outer wall is a blocked unfinished stairway, which could be part of earlier plans for the pyramid substructure or part of an unfinished south tomb, meant for the Ka of the deceased king.

=== North chapel ===
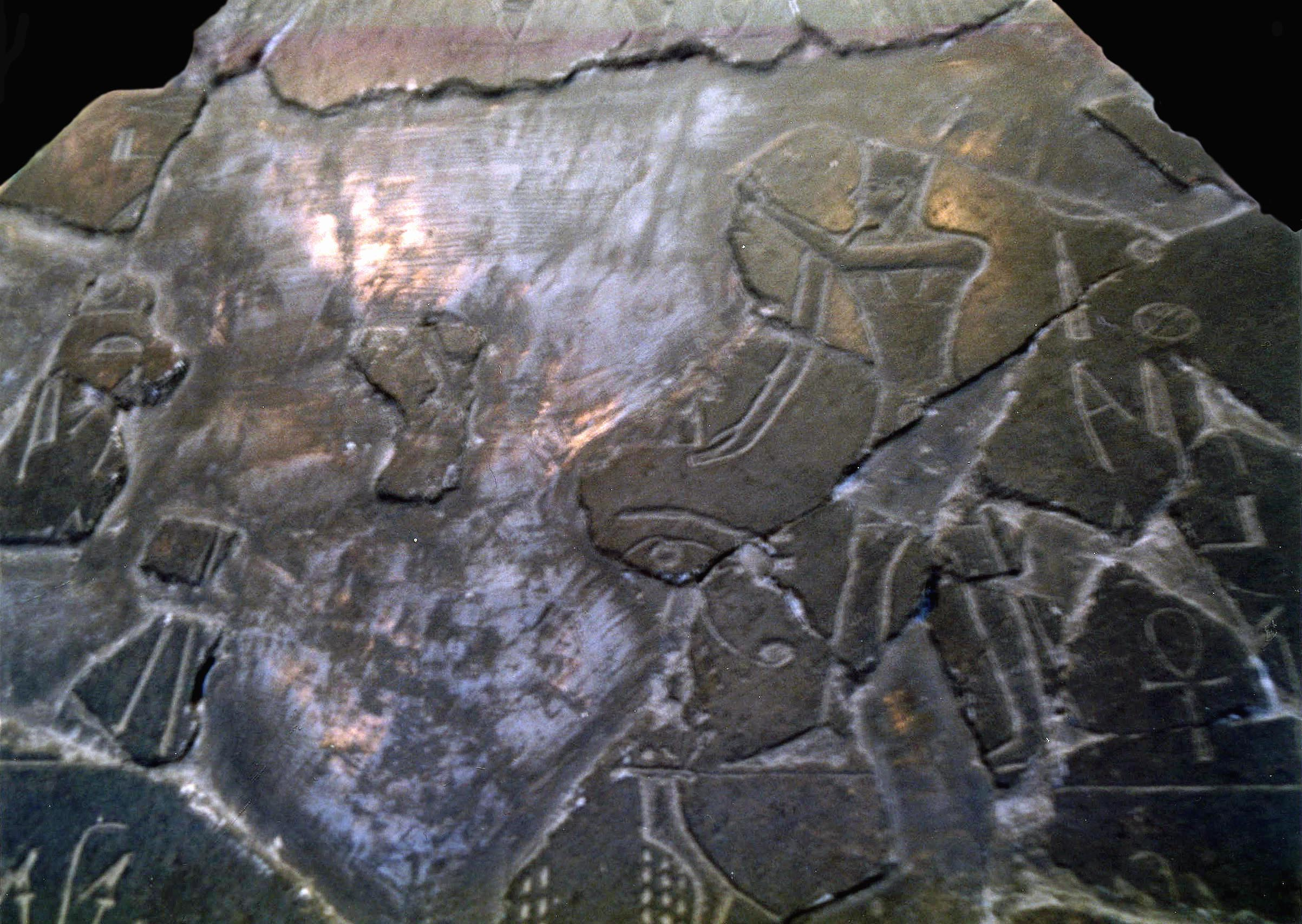
East face of the pyramidion of the pyramid of Khendjer, depicting the king with Atum and Re. Egyptian Museum, Cairo, JE 53045

A small chapel was built immediately adjacent to the north side of the main pyramid, inside the inner enclosure wall. The chapel was raised on a platform and could be reached by two stairways. The north wall of the chapel housed a yellow quartzite false door. The location of this door was unusual as it should have stood on the wall closest to the pyramid, i.e. the south wall rather than the north one. The few surviving fragments of relief from the chapel show standard scenes with offering bearers.

=== Mortuary temple ===
On the eastern side of the pyramid lay a mortuary temple which spread across both enclosure walls. This allowed for the outer section of the temple to be placed outside the inner wall, with the inner sanctuary on the inside of the inner wall. Very little remains of the temple, except for pieces of reliefs and columns and parts of its pavement.

== Main pyramid ==
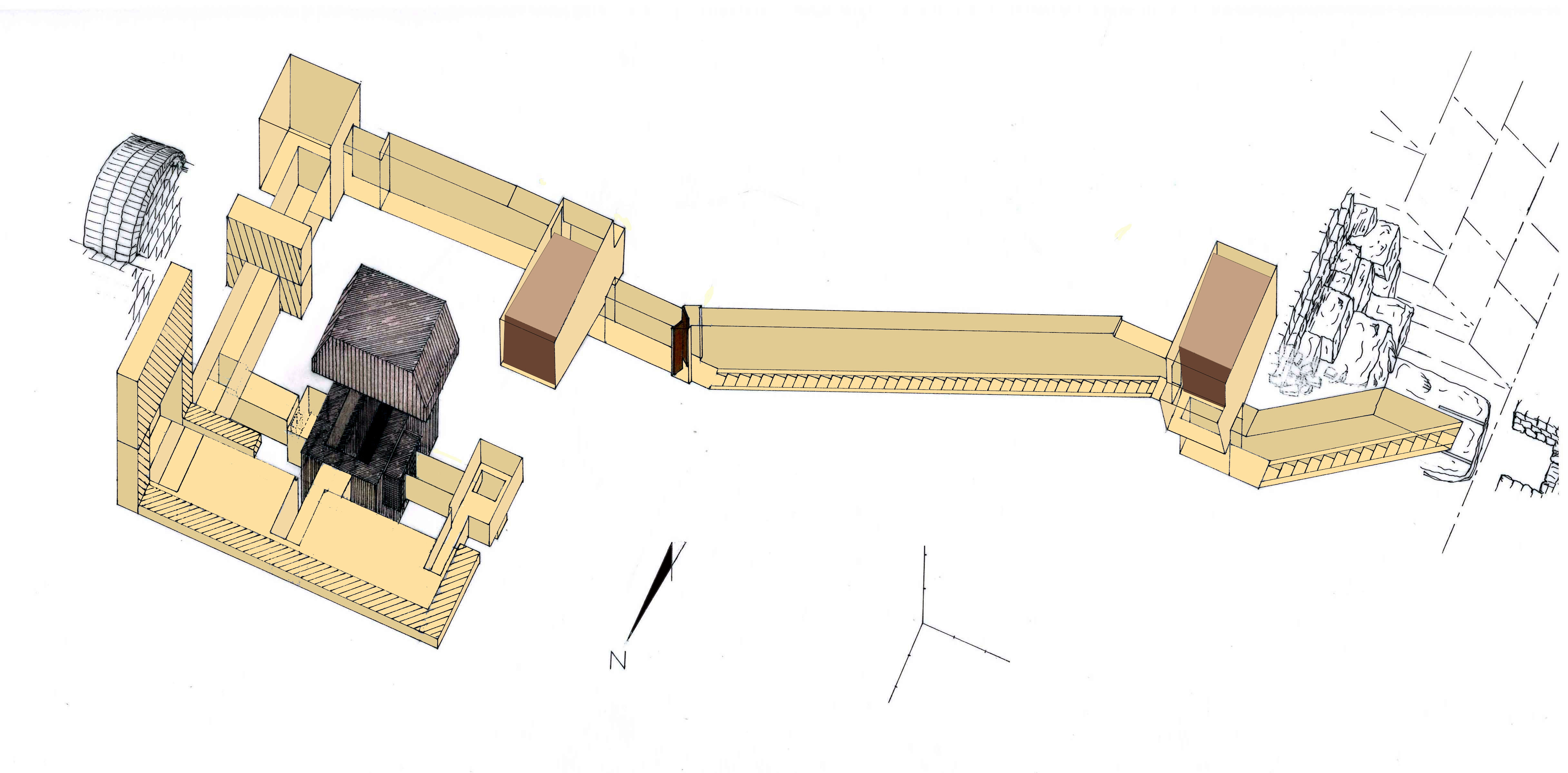
Plan of the underground chambers of the pyramid, showing the open granite portcullises.

The pyramid originally stood at 70 royal cubits in height, which is about 37 metres (121 ft). The pyramid was constructed with a mudbrick core and a limestone outer casing with its backing stones. These and the limestone casing were both quarried by stone robbers, which left the core unprotected. The core fared very badly with time and the pyramid now stands only one meter (3.3 feet) tall due to its disintegration.

A fragmented black granite pyramidion was discovered on the east side of the complex and has been restored by G. Jéquier. It is now on display at the Egyptian Museum, Cairo. The pyramidion is decorated by reliefs showing Khendjer making offerings and is inscribed with the prenomen "Userkare" (Strong is the ka of Ra), which is thus known to be a throne name of Khendjer.

The entrance to the substructures is located at the base of the southern end of the pyramid west side. A stairway with 13 steps leads to a chamber housing a large granite portcullis similar to those encountered in the Mazghuna pyramids, also dated from the Middle Kingdom. The portcullis was originally destined to block the way to the burial chamber but was never put into place across the passage. Beyond the portcullis chamber, a further stairway with 39 steps continued down to a closed double-leaf wooden door. Beyond the door is a second portcullis chamber, which was also left open. In turn this leads to a small antechamber and from there on to a further corridor whose access was concealed beneath the paving of the antechamber floor. This corridor leads to the burial chamber.

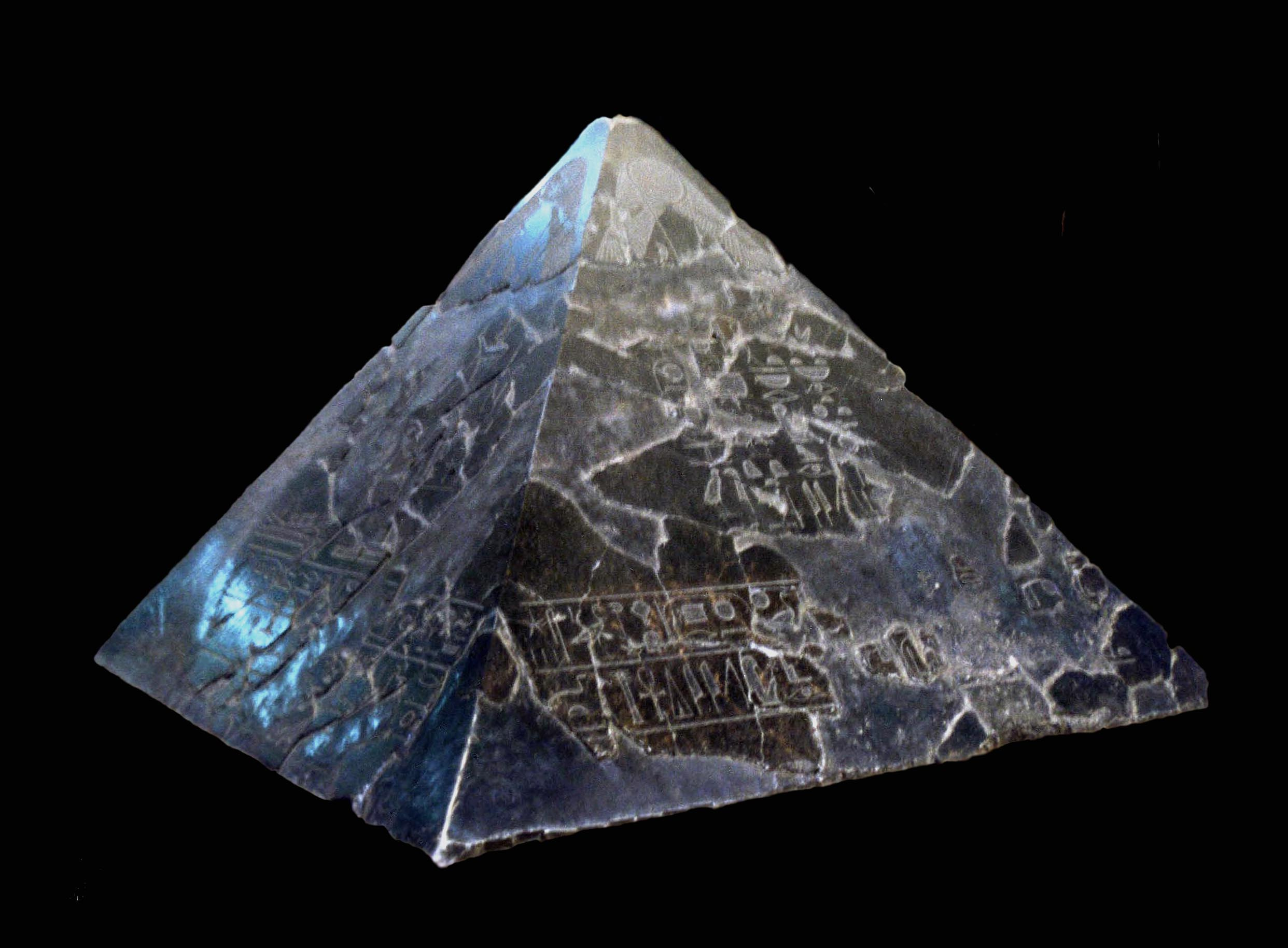
Pyramidion of the pyramid of Khendjer, Egyptian Museum, JE 53045.

Khendjer's second portcullis chamber, antechamber and corridor were constructed in the corner of a large trench dug in the ground. The burial chamber, which is made of a colossal monolithic quartzite block, was placed in the trench before the pyramid construction started, in a manner similar to the burial chamber of Amenemhet III at Hawara. The weight of the quartzite block was estimated at 150 tons by G. Jéquier. The block was carved into two compartments destined to receive the king's coffin, canopic chest and funerary goods. Two large quartzite beams weighing 60 tons formed its roof. Once the block and its roof had been put into position, the workers built a gabled roof of limestone beams and a brick vault above it to relieve the weight of the pyramid. The mechanism for closing the vault consisted of sand-filled shafts on which rested the props of the northern ceiling slab. This would be lowered on the vault on draining the sand. After draining all the sand, the workmen escaped through the corridor which they filled with masonry and paved over its opening in the antechamber.

== Subsidiary pyramid ==
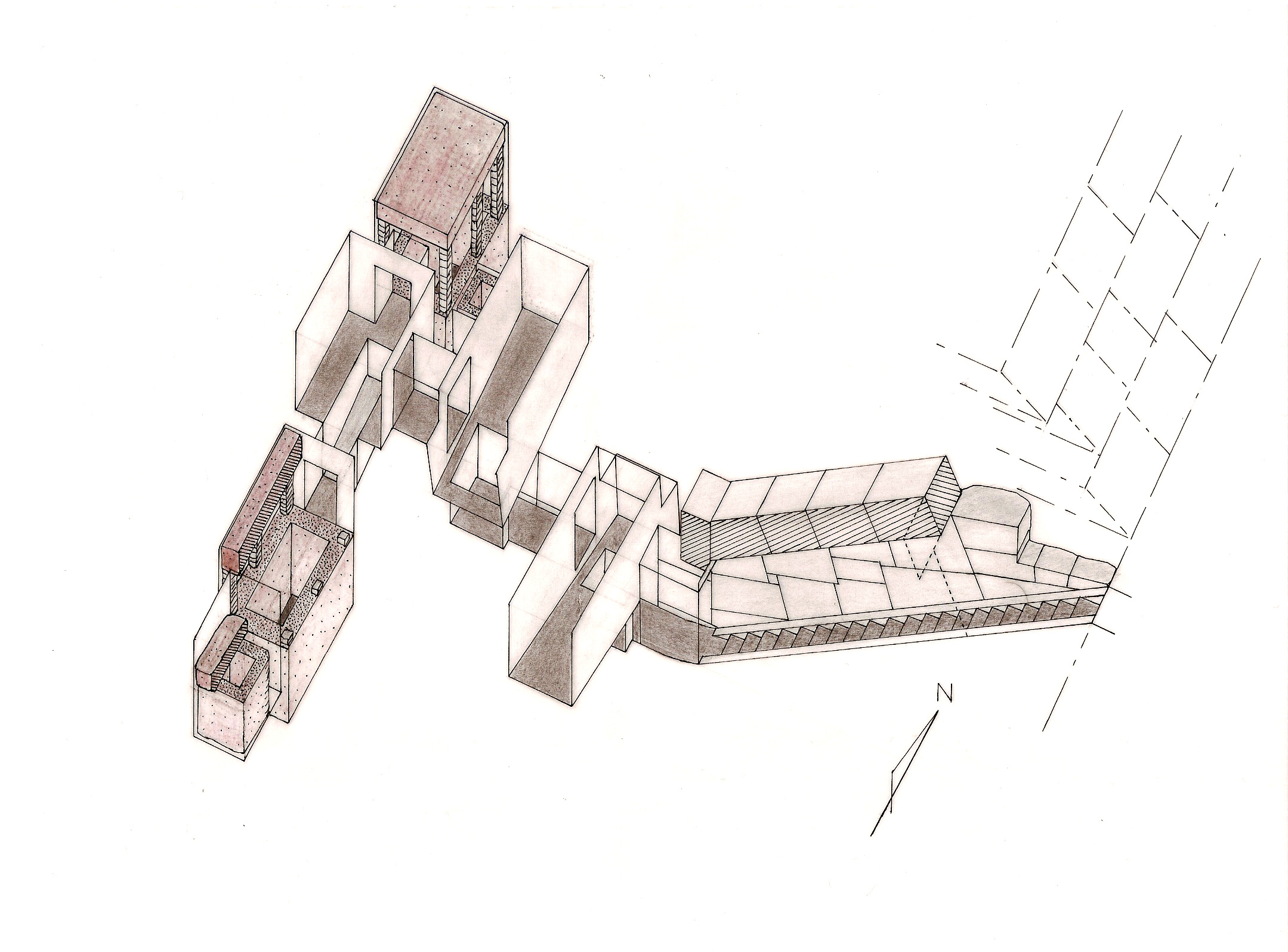
Substructures of the subsidiary pyramid.

At the north eastern corner of Khendjer's pyramid complex is a small subsidiary pyramid, which is thought to have been prepared for the burials of two of Khendjer's queens. G. Jéquier also found shaft tombs nearby, which may have been prepared for other royal family members. The entrance to the substructures of this pyramid lie at the base of its eastern base. A small stairway leads to two portcullis chambers similar to those found in the main pyramid. Here too the portcullises were left open. Beyond is an antechamber branching to the north and south to two burial chambers lined with masonry and both housing a large quartzite coffer. The lids of the coffers were found propped on blocks as they should be before any burial. The two coffers were thus most probably never lowered into place and put into use.

Some unexpected turn of events probably prevented their use, although there is nothing directly suggesting that the king wasn't interred as planned in the main pyramid. However, in his 1997 study of the Second Intermediate Period, egyptologist Kim Ryholt concludes that Khendjer's successor, Imyremeshaw, usurped the throne.

== See also ==
- List of Egyptian pyramids
- Egyptian pyramid construction techniques
