= Papyrus Brooklyn 35.1446 =

Ancient Egyptian document

The Brooklyn Papyrus 35.1446, also known as simply the Papyrus Brooklyn, is an ancient Egyptian document now in the Brooklyn Museum.

== Archaeological history ==
It was bought by Charles Edwin Wilbour in Egypt between 1881 and 1896. The document probably comes from Thebes. After the death of Wilbour, the papyrus was given to the Brooklyn Museum by his widow in 1916, but remained in the home of Theodora Wilbour, a daughter of Charles Wilbour, until 1935. At that time, the papyrus consisted of approximately 600 small fragments, which were reassembled from 1950 to 1952. In 1955 the papyrus was published by William C. Hayes. It is one of the most important surviving administrative documents from Egypt in the Middle Kingdom.

== Content ==
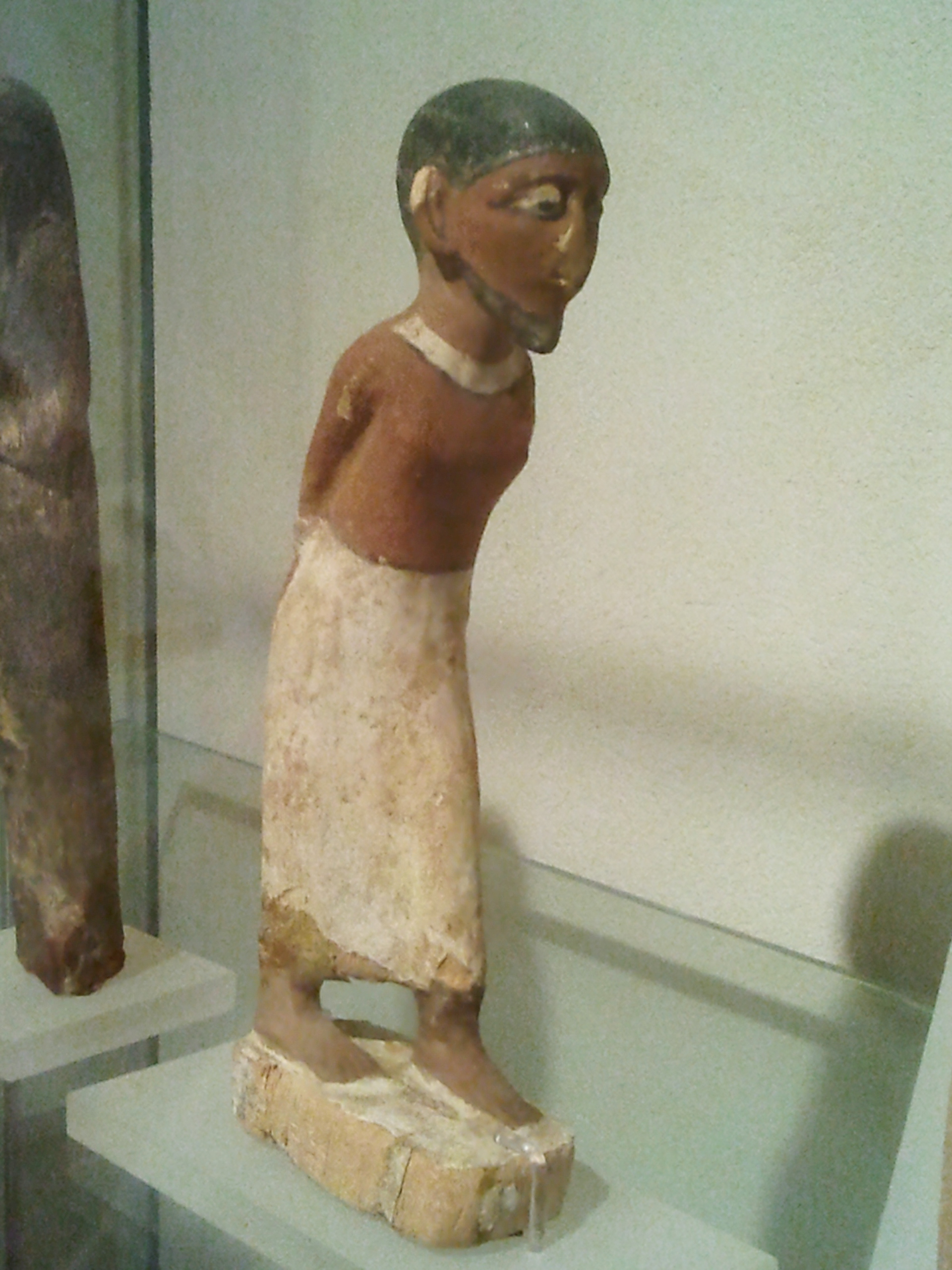
Figurine from Egypt of Semitic slave

The papyrus is inscribed on both sides and dates to 1809–1743 BCE.

=== Front side (recto) ===
On the front is a list of 80 Egyptians in various columns who have apparently escaped from an institution called a Large Prison / Labor Camp (ḫnrt-wr) and are registering their discovery. The document lists their names, the father's name, as well as a high official, a place or an institution to which they originally belonged. There is a note in another column as to whether the person is male or female. There follows an administrative statement, a place where the case was ticked off with a note of where the refugees are currently. Finally, there are two notes as to whether the case is closed. The content appears to date from the reign of Amenemhat III into the 13th Dynasty. Copies of a letter and royal decree to Vizier Ankhu are also included within the document.

=== Back side (verso) ===
The back of the document concerns the transfers of 95 servants, of which 45 of Asiatic origin, to a woman named Senebtisi, apparently the widow of Vizier Resseneb, himself son of the aforementioned Vizier Ankhu. In particular, the many Asiatic names on this list aroused the interest of researchers and shows the high proportion of foreigners in Egypt in the 13th Dynasty.

The Asiatic slaves appear to have spoken a Northwest Semitic language including a theophoric name incorporating Reshef.
