= Aabeni (high steward) =

Egyptian official

Aabeni (Aabni)
- High steward
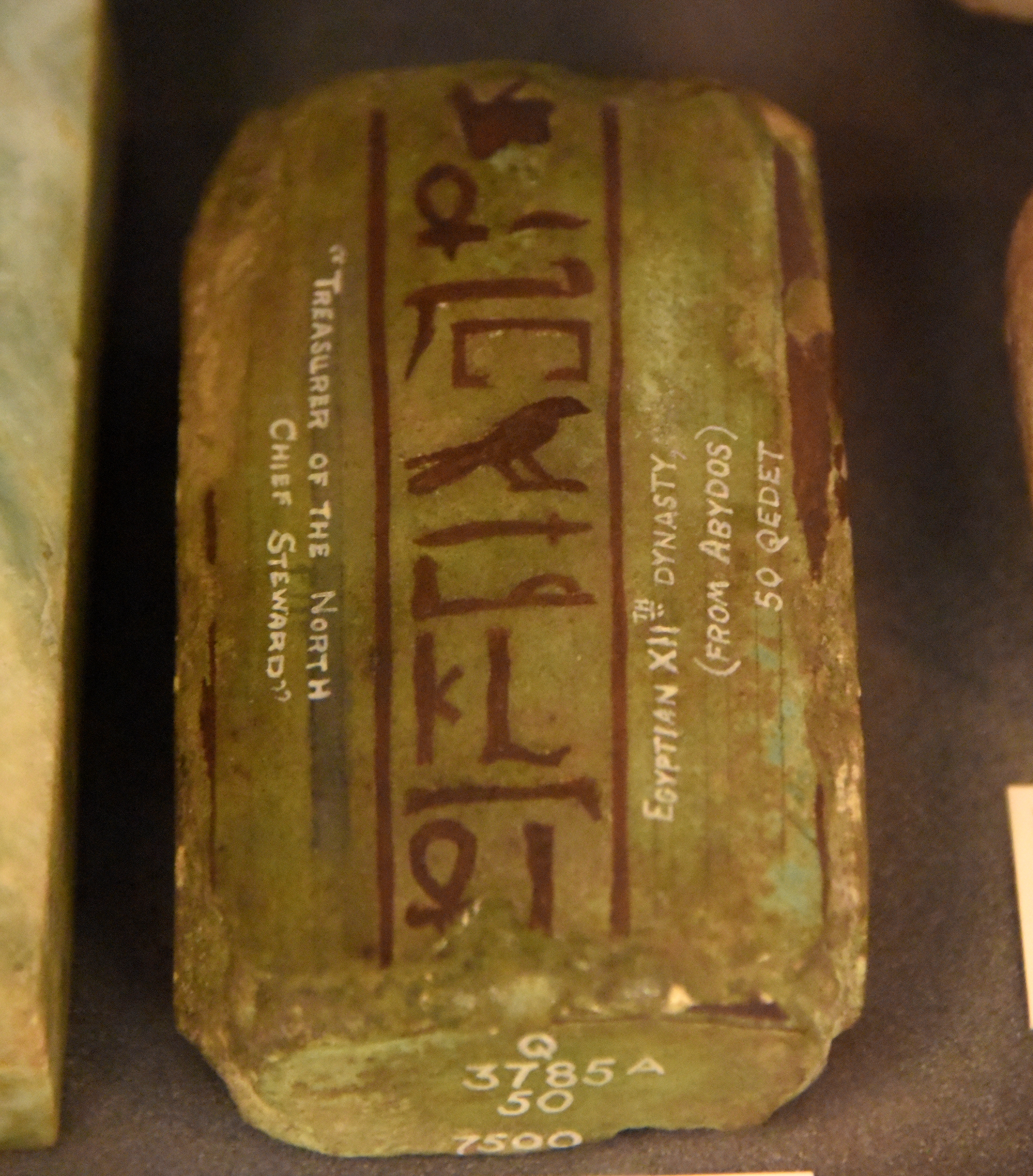
- Green glazed faience weight, inscribed for the high Steward Aabeni
- Dynasty: early 13th dynasty

Aabeni was an ancient Egyptian official with the title high steward. He was one of the most important officials at the royal court in the early Thirteenth Dynasty.

== Attestations ==
Aabeni {ꜥꜣb-n⸗j} is known from a number of monuments, especially at Abydos.

=== Papyrus Boulaq 18 (LM) ===
At Thebes, he appeared in the Papyrus Boulaq 18 (Larger Manuscript). This papyrus is an account of the Theban palace dating to the early Thirteenth Dynasty where he appears in several lists of officials. Also mentioned are queen Aya and vizier Ankhu. In Egyptology, the exact dating of Papyrus Boulaq 18 is disputed and it remains open which king he served.

=== Block Liverpool GM E.32 ===
At Abydos, a block with titles Royal Scribe {ḫtmw-bjtj} and High Steward {jmj-rꜣ pr-wr}.

=== Weight Petrie Museum UC80200 ===
At Abydos, Aabeni is known from a glazed faience weight.

=== Stela CG 20391 (weak) ===
At Abydos North, a limestone round-topped stela made in "13th Dyn. Theban Workshop 2".

== See also ==
- Ankhu (vizier)
- Aya (queen)
