= Wegaf =

Egyptian Middle Kingdom pharaoh

- Ugaf
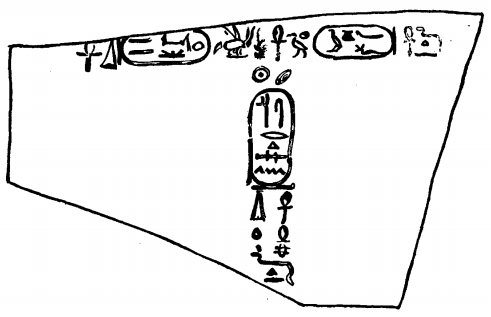
- Drawing of the Rubensohn plaquette from Elephantine realized in 1907 by Georges Legrain. The plaquette mentions Khutawyre Wegaf and a king Senwosret.

Pharaoh
- Reign: 2 regnal years 1794–1757 BC
- Predecessor: Sedjefakare (Ryholt)
- Successor: Khendjer (Ryholt)
Royal titulary
Horus name
Sekhem-Netjeru
Sḫm-nṯrw
The power of the gods
| G5 | sxm R8A |
Nebty name
Khabaw
Ḫˁj-b3w
The two Ladies whose Bas are manifest
| G16 | xa a G30 |
Golden Horus
Meri-(tawj)
Mrj-(tw3j)
Beloved of the two lands
| G8 | mr i i N16 N16 |
Prenomen
Khutawyre
Ḫwj-t3wj-Rˁ
Re protects the two lands

| M23 X1 L2 X1 | ra D43 N17 N17 |
Nomen
Wegaf
Wgj=f

| G39 N5 | w g F18 f |
- Dynasty: Thirteenth Dynasty of Egypt

Khutawyre Wegaf (or Ugaf) was a pharaoh of the early Thirteenth Dynasty of Egypt in the late Middle Kingdom/Second Intermediate Period. He is known from several sources, including a stele and statues. In the Turin King List, he is the first ruler of this dynasty with a reign of 2 regnal years.

== Early life ==
There is no evidence that Wegaf was of royal parentage. There is a general known from a scarab with the same name, who is perhaps identical with this king. How he emerged as king remains debated.

== Attestations ==
Wegaf is mainly attested in Upper Egypt.

=== Abydos, Cairo JE 35256 (weak) ===
At Abydos, a stele dated to a regnal Year 4 and dedicated to preserving the procession road in the area of Wepwawet was usurped by Neferhotep I. Anthony Leahy suggested that it was originally issued by Wegaf, an opinion shared by Darell Baker but not by Ryholt, who rather suggested that the original issuer of the stela was more likely another pharaoh of the Thirteenth Dynasty, Seth Meribre.

=== Thebes, Cairo JE 37510 ===
At Karnak, a stela fragment with the royal name of Wegaf belonging to the scribe of documents of the king of the presence, god's father, and wab-priest of Amun [...] (name lost) was found by Legrain in the Cachette of the Great Temple.

The title "god's father" is often a honorific title given to a non-royal father of a king or the father-in-law of a king. Thus, this official may have been related to Wegaf. It may also be a priestly title ranking a high priest, i.e. God's Father of Amun.

=== Thebes, Cairo JE 33740 ===
At Karnak, a granite throne fragment of Wegaf found by Legrain in the central court of the Great Temple.

=== Medamud, Cairo JE 15900 ===
At Medamud, a red granite bark-stand from the Temple of Montu. The bark stand is variously given the identification JE 51900 or JE 15900. It contains the cartouches of both Amenemhat VII and Wegaf. Apparently, the name of Wegaf was added to the bark-stand originally dedicated by Sedjefakare Kay Amenemhat VII.

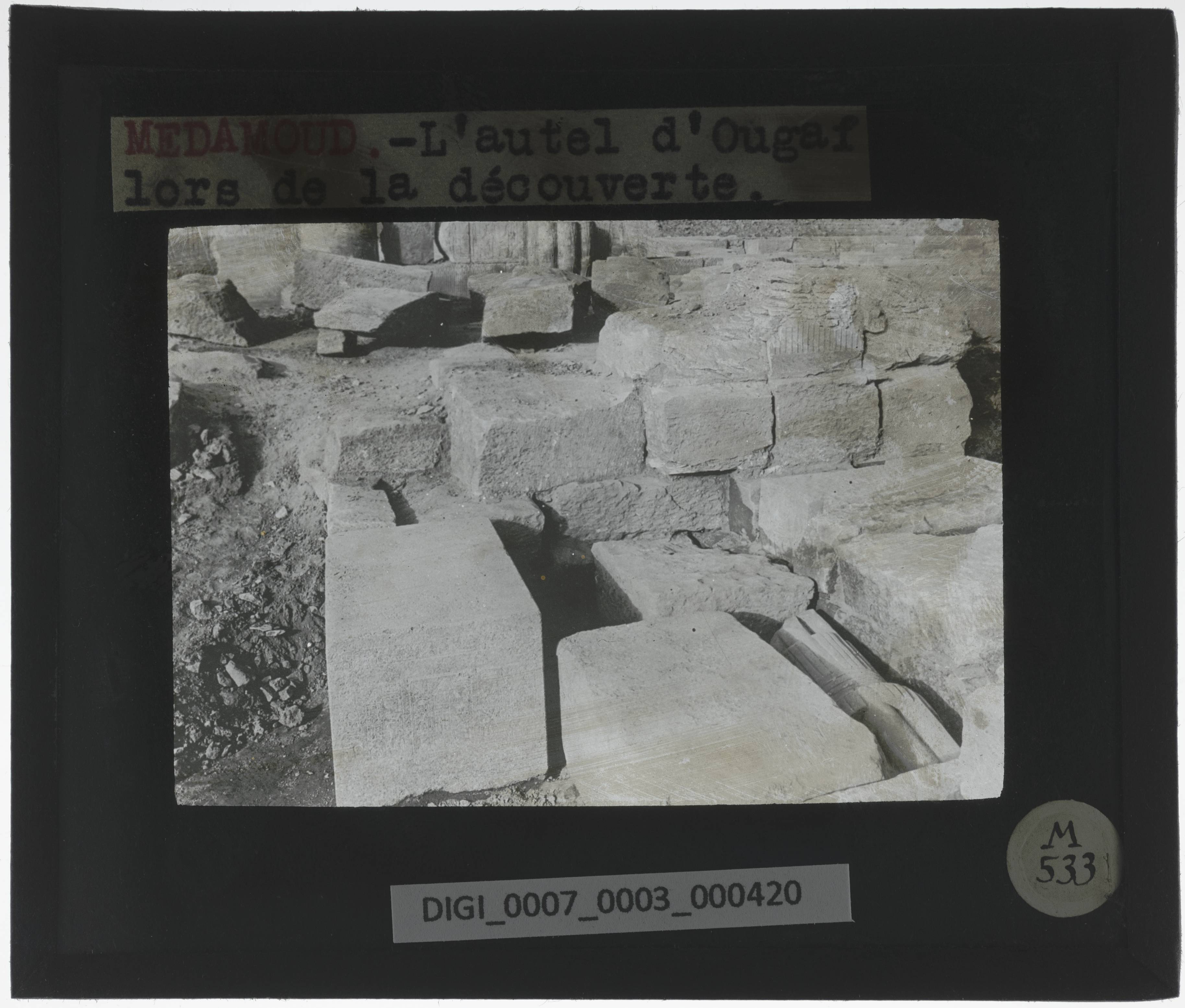

=== Elephantine, Rubensohn plaquette, Cairo JE 38333 ===
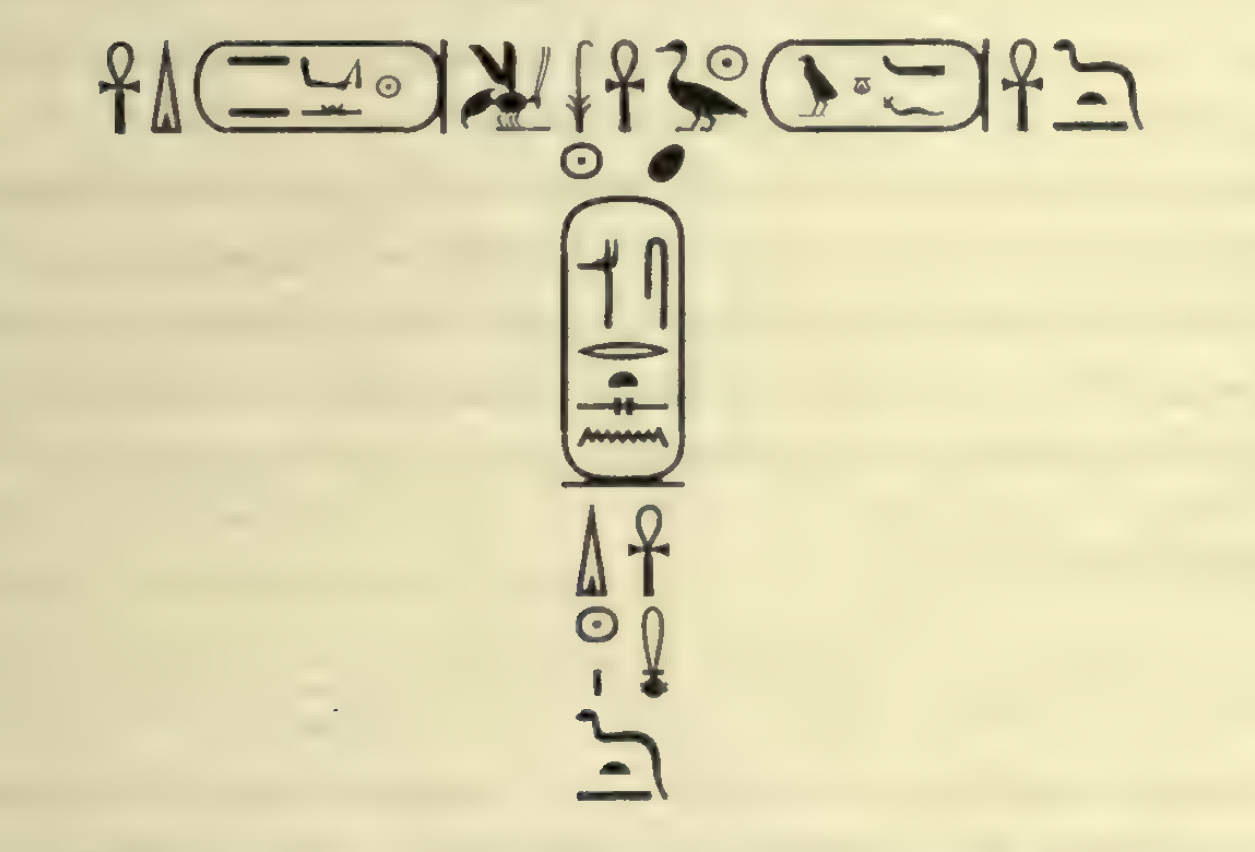
Diagram of the Rubensohn plaquette inscription by George Legrain (public domain)

At Elephantine, the Rubensohn plaquette mentions Wegaf and a king Senwosret. The horizontal line reads Khutawyre (cartouche left) and Wegaf (cartouche right). The vertical line reads Senwosret (cartouche). A question is if Wegaf added his name (horizontal line) to that of Senwosret (vertical line), or if it was written at the same time. There are three kings with the name Senwosret in the Twelfth Dynasty, and one king in the Second Intermediate Period.

=== Khartoum 65-7 ===
At Semna (West). Text from a statue of Wegaf. No more information found.

== Non-contemporary Attestations ==
=== Turin King List ===
In the Turin King List entry 7:05 is listed "The Dual King Khutawyra he acted as king for 2 years, 3 months and 24 days" {nsw-bit ḫw-tꜢwy-rꜤ ir.n f m nswyt rnpt 2 Ꜣbdw 3 hrw 24}.

In chronological terms, the Turin King List puts Khutawyre following the heading in Column 7:04, establishing him as the ruler in a new sequence of kings. Here he is followed by "Sekhemkara".

== Theories ==
A king with the name Khutawyre appears in the Turin King List as the first ruler of the Thirteenth Dynasty of Egypt. However, some researchers—especially Kim Ryholt—argue that the writer of the king list confused the name Khutawyre with that of Sekhemre Khutawy Sobekhotep and consequently placed Wegaf as the first pharaoh of the Thirteenth Dynasty when he should have been placed in the middle of it. In particular, Sekhemre Khutawy Sobekhotep is regarded by Ryholt and other Egyptologists, including Darrell Baker, as the first pharaoh of the Thirteenth Dynasty and a son of Amenemhat IV.

== Bibliography ==
- Ryholt, K.S.B. The Political Situation in Egypt during the Second Intermediate Period, c.1800-1550 BC (Carsten Niebuhr Institute Publications, vol. 20. Copenhagen: Museum Tusculanum Press, 1997).

| Preceded by Sedjefakare | Pharaoh of Egypt; Thirteenth Dynasty | Succeeded by Khendjer |
