= Sehetepkare Intef =

Egyptian Middle Kingdom king

- Sehotepkare Intef, Intef IV, Intef V, Antef, Anyotef, Anjotef, Inyotef
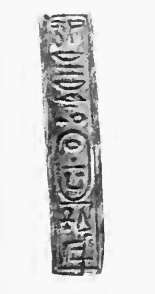
- Cylinder seal bearing the cartouche of pharaoh Hetepkare, probably [Se]hetepkare Intef IV.

Pharaoh
- Reign: less than 10 years, between 1759 BC and 1749 BC or c. 1710 BC
- Predecessor: Imyremeshaw
- Successor: Seth Meribre
Royal titulary
Prenomen
Sehetepkare
S.ḥtp-k3-rˁ
"He who pleases the Ka of Ra"
M23 t L2 t < ra s Htp t p D28 >
Turin canon
...ka...
k3
< HASH D28 Z1 > G7
Nomen
Intef
In-it.f
"Intef" (lit. His father brought him)
G39 N5 < W25 n&t&f >
Turin canon
Intef
in-it.f
i W25 n&t&f G7
- Consorts: uncertain, possibly Queen Aya
- Dynasty: 13th Dynasty

Sehetepkare Intef was the a minor king of the early 13th Dynasty during the late Middle Kingdom.

Sehetepkare Intef reigned from Memphis for a short period, certainly less than ten years, between 1759 BC and 1749 BC or c. 1710 BC.

== Attestations ==
=== Seated statue, Cairo JE 67834 ===
In the Faiyum, Sehetepkare Intef is attested by the lower half of a seated statue from the temple complex of goddess Renenutet at Medinet Madi.

=== Cylinder seal, Petrie UC 11532 (weak) ===
Of Unknown Provenance, a cylinder seal with the prenomen Hotepkare, has been assigned to Sehotepkare but not by Ryholt.

=== Non-contemporary attestation ===
==== Turin King List ====
The Turin canon 7:22 (Gardiner 6:22) mentions "The Dual King [Sehotep]ka[ra] Intef, ... 3 days". In this list he is between 7:21 Imyremeshaw and 7:23 Seth Meribre.

== Chronological position and reign length ==
The exact chronological position of Sehetepkare Intef in the 13th Dynasty is not known for certain owing to uncertainties affecting earlier kings of the dynasty. Darrell Baker places him as the twenty-third king of the dynasty, Kim Ryholt as the twenty-fourth and Jürgen von Beckerath as the nineteenth. Furthermore, Ryholt believes Sehetepkare Intef was the fifth ruler bearing that name, making him Intef V, while Aidan Dodson, von Beckerath and Darrell Baker posit that he was Intef IV.

The length of his reign is lost in a lacuna of the papyrus and cannot be recovered, except for the end of the inscription which reads "...[and] 3 days". Kim Ryholt gives ten years for the combined reigns of Imyremeshaw, Sehetepkare Intef and Seth Meribre. Another piece of evidence concerning the reign of Intef is found in the 13th Dynasty Papyrus Boulaq 18 which reports, among other things, the composition of a royal family comprising ten king's sisters, an unspecified number of king's brothers, three daughters of the king, a son named Redienef and a queen named Aya. Even though the king's name is lost in a lacuna, Ryholt's analysis of the papyrus only leaves Imyremeshaw and Sehetepkare Intef as possibilities. This is significant because the papyrus reports a year 3 and a year 5 dates for this king. Additionally, a date "regnal year 5, 3rd month of Shemu, 18th day" is known from the unfinished pyramid complex neighboring that of Khendjer, which may thus have been built by the same ruler, a close successor of Khendjer, perhaps Intef.

The exact circumstances of the end of Intef's reign are unknown but the fact that his successor Seth Meribre did not use filiative nomina points to a non-royal birth. Consequently, Ryholt proposes that Seth Meribre usurped the throne.

Preceded by Imyremeshaw	Pharaoh of Egypt; Thirteenth Dynasty	Succeeded by Seth Meribre
