= Papyrus Boulaq 18 =

Ancient Egyptian administrative document

The Papyrus Boulaq 18 is an ancient Egyptian administrative document. It contains an account of the Theban palace dating to the 13th Dynasty (around 1750 BC). The papyrus lists the palace officials and the rations they received day by day. Important officials mentioned are, for example, the vizier Ankhu, but also the queen Aya. Therefore, the document is of great historical importance. It also reports the journey of the king to the temple at Medamud and reports the arrival of a delegation of Nubians.

== Discovery ==
In 1860 AD, the Papyrus Boulaq 18 was found in the tomb of the scribe of the great enclosure Neferhotep at Dra Abu el-Naga by Auguste Mariette. It is now in the Egyptian Museum in Cairo.

== People mentioned ==
- [...] (king) name destroyed
- Aya (queen)
- Ankhu (vizier)
- Aabeni (high steward)
- Titi (King's Acquaintance)
- Renseneb (Chief of the Tens of Upper Egypt)
- Seneb (Chief of the Tens of Upper Egypt)
- Dedusobek (Chief of the Tens of Upper Egypt)
- Seneb (King's Acquaintance)
- Senebef (King's Acquaintance)
- Haankhef (King's Sealer, Overseer of Fields)
- Sobekhotep (Officer of the Ruler's Crew), cf. Sobekhotep III.
- Iuseneb (Chief of the Tens of Upper Egypt)
- Resseneb (Chief Scribe of the Vizier), cf. son of Vizier Ankhu

Next to the queen, other family members of the king are mentioned. These include the king's son Redinefni, as well as several sisters of the kingː Senetsen, Renre, Bebiaaat, Bebisheryt, Pesshu, Horemhab, Neferetiu, Khememet and Zathanthor.

== Theories ==
The exact dating of the document is disputed. The name of the king is heavily destroyed. Formerly scholars identified the pharaoh in question with Sekhemre Khutawy Sobekhotep, but recent studies, in particular by Kim Ryholt, have led to the identification of the king as either Imyremeshaw or Sehetepkare Intef. The 2019 full new publication of the papyrus by Schafik Allam reads the partly destroyed cartouche as Ameni.... Sobekhotep (Sekhemre Khutawy Sobekhotep).

== See also ==
- List of ancient Egyptian papyri

== Main editions ==
- A. Mariette: Les papyrus egyptiens du Musee de Boulaq vol. II, Paris 1872
- A. Scharff: Ein Rechnungsbuch des königlichen Hofes aus der 13. Dynastie, In Zeitschrift für ägyptische Sprache und Altertumskunde 57 (1922), S. 51-68, Tafeln 1**–24**
- Schafik Allam: Hieratischer Papyrus Bulaq 18. 2 volumes, Tübingen 2019
