= Khendjer =

Egyptian pharaoh

- Khenzer
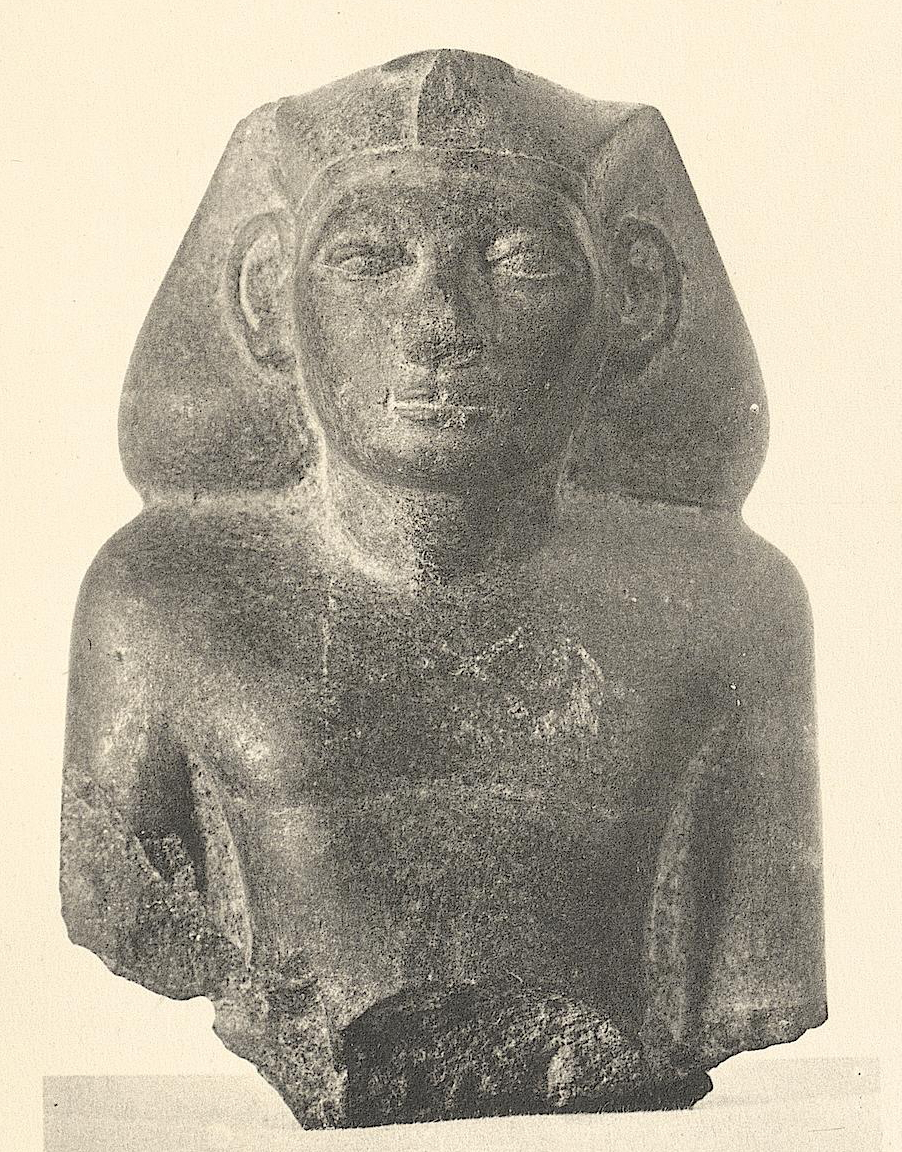
- Upper part of a statue of Khendjer from his pyramid complex. Cairo Egyptian Museum, JE 53368

Pharaoh
- Reign: Five years starting in 1764, 1756 or 1718 BC
- Predecessor: Wegaf (most likely) or Khaankhre Sobekhotep
- Successor: Imyremeshaw
Royal titulary
Prenomen
Userkare
Wsr-k3-Rˁ
Strong is the Ka of Ra
M23 t L2 t < ra wsr s kA >
Turin King List: User[...]re Khendjer
Wsr-...-Rˁ-ḫnḏr
Strong is the [...] of Ra, boar
< ra wsr HASH Z1 x n Dr r >
Nomen
Khendjer
Ḫnḏr
Boar
< x n Dr r >
- Consort: Sonb[henas]
- Burial: Saqqara South, Pyramid of Khendjer
- Dynasty: Thirteenth Dynasty of Egypt

Userkare Khendjer was a minor king of the early Thirteenth Dynasty of Egypt during the Middle Kingdom. Khendjer possibly reigned for four to five years, archaeological attestations show that he was on the throne for at least three or four years three months and five days. Khendjer had a small pyramid built for himself in Saqqara and it is therefore likely that his capital was in Memphis.

== Reign ==
The highest attested date for Khendjer's reign is Year 5 IV Akhet day 15 (season of the Inundation). Kim Ryholt notes that two dated control notes on stone blocks from his unfinished pyramid complex give him a minimum reign of 3 or 4 years 3 months and 5 days. The aforementioned control notes are dated to Year 1 I Akhet day 10 and Year 5 IV Akhet day 15 of his reign. In these control notes, the names of three officials involved in building the pyramid are also identified. They are the Interior Overseer of the Inner Palace, Senebtyfy {jmj-rꜣ ꜥẖnwtj (n) kꜣp snb.tj⸗fj}, the Interior Overseer Ameny {jmj-rꜣ ꜥẖnwtj jmnjj} and the Interior Overseer, Craftsman, Shebenu {jmj-rꜣ ꜥẖnwtj; ḫrp ḥmww šbnw}. The latter is also attested by other sources.

== Attestations ==
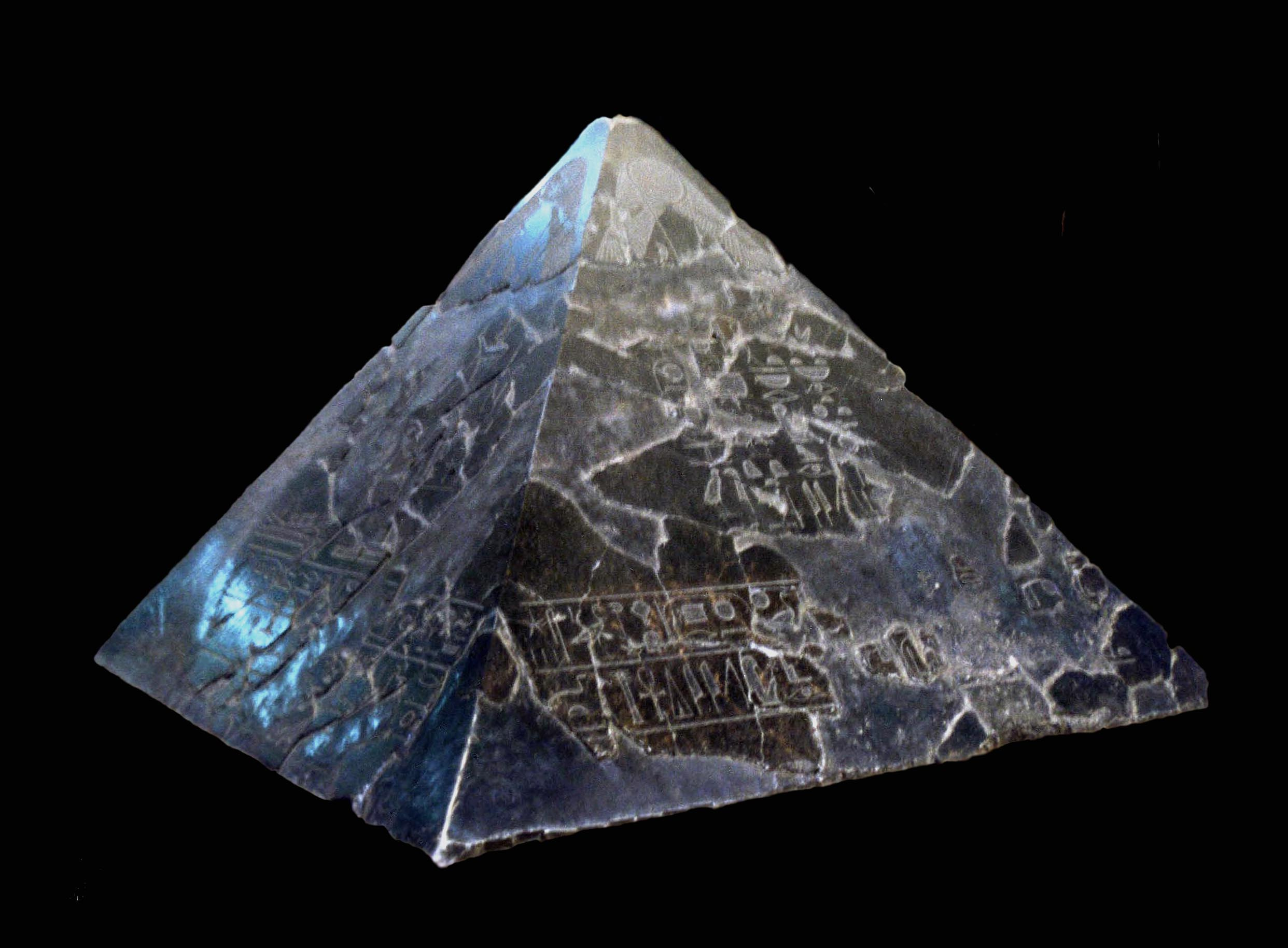
The pyramidion from Khendjer's pyramid at the Egyptian Museum in Cairo

At Saqqara South, the Pyramid of Khendjer may have been completed as it was found with a pyramidion during excavations by G. Jequier. There was found a fragment of a canopic jar, which offers a partial name for his queen, Seneb ... "which may be restored as Sonb[henas]." There are also some notes and marks of people working at the pyramid.

At Abydos, a stela, belonging to a Controller of the Phyle Amenyseneb, record a building project by the king at the Temple of Osiris. On this stela the name Khendjer also appear along with the prenomen Nimaatre. Some have speculated that Khendjer had a second prenomen. However, it was also the prenomen of Amenemhat III. Amenyseneb is also associated by another stela with vizier Ankhu. See also a double-sided stela of Amenyseneb.

Another stela once in Liverpool (destroyed in World War II), provides the name of the king's son "Khedjer". He might be a son of the king. Other objects with his name, according to the list provided by Ryholt, include three cylinder-seals from Athribis, a tile found near el-Lisht, scarab seals and an axe blade.

On surface marks on building blocks from the pyramid of the king, appear a person called Shebenw. The same person is perhaps also known from a statue found on Elephantine and on inscriptions at Aswan.

== Non-contemporary attestations ==
The Turin King List column 7:20 mentions "Dual King Userkare Khendjer, x years ...". In this list Khendjer is between Sekhemre Khutawy Sobekhotep (7:19) and Imyremeshaw (7:21).

== Theories ==
The name Khendjer is poorly attested in Egyptian. Khendjer "has been interpreted as a foreign name hnzr and equated with the Semitic personal name h(n)zr, [for] "boar" according to the Danish Egyptologist Kim Ryholt. He notes that this identification is confirmed by the fact that the name h(n)zr is written as hzr in a variant spelling of this king's name on a seal from this king's reign. Ryholt states that the word 'boar' is:

attested as huzīru in Akkadian, hinzīr in Arabic, hazīrā in Aramaic, hazīr in Hebrew (the name is attested as hēzīr in I Chron. 24:15, Neh. 10:20) hu-zi-ri in the Nuzi texts, hnzr in Ugarit, and perhaps hi-zi-ri in Amorite.

Khendjer could be, according to this theory, the earliest known Semitic king of a native Egyptian dynasty. Khendjer's prenomen or throne name, Userkare, translates as "The Soul of Re is Powerful."

=== Chronological position ===
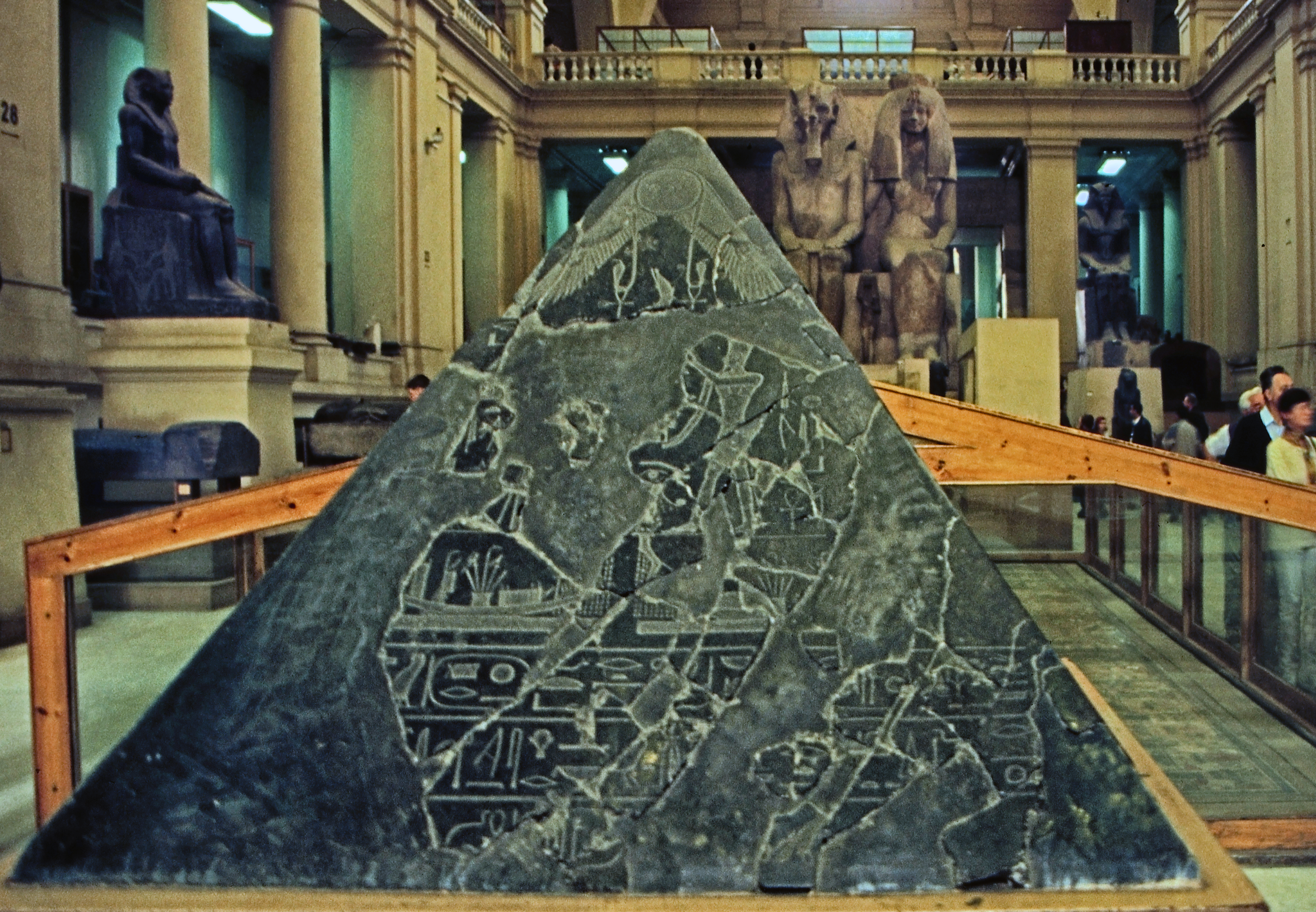
Khendjer making offerings on the pyramidion from his pyramid

The exact chronological position of Khendjer in the Thirteenth Dynasty is not known for certain owing to uncertainties affecting earlier kings of the dynasty.

Egyptologist Darrell Baker makes him the twenty-first king of the dynasty, Ryholt sees him as the twenty-second king and Jürgen von Beckerath places him as the seventeenth pharaoh of the dynasty. Furthermore, the identity of his predecessor is still debated: Baker and Ryholt believe it was Wegaf, but that pharaoh is confused with Khaankhre Sobekhotep, so that it is not known which one of the two founded the Thirteenth Dynasty and which one was Khendjer's predecessor.

Several absolute dates have been proposed for his reign, depending on the scholar: 1764—1759 BC as proposed by Ryholt and Baker, 1756—1751 BC as reported by Redford, and 1718—1712 BC as per Schneider.

Preceded by Wegaf	Pharaoh of Egypt; Thirteenth Dynasty	Succeeded by Imyremeshaw
