= Resseneb (son of Ankhu) =

Ancient Egyptian vizier

- Vizier of Egypt
- Predecessor: Ankhu
- Successor: Iymeru
- Dynasty: 13th Dynasty
- Pharaoh: (?)
- Spouse: Senebtisi (?)
- Father: Ankhu
- Mother: Mereryt

Resseneb was a short-lived vizier in Upper Egypt during the 13th Dynasty, preceded by his father, the famous Ankhu, and succeeded by his brother Iymeru.

== Family ==
He was the son of the vizier Ankhu and was born to Mereryt. His younger brother was the vizier Iymeru. His sister was Senebhenas, married to Wepwauthotep.

== Attestations ==
Resseneb is attested in several sources. He is first attested as 'Great Scribe of the Vizier' (Scarab impression Mirgissa 3-4 (Q 373); Abydos Stela Bristol H 2732), serving his father, the vizier Ankhu, and later became a 'vizier' himself.

=== Papyrus Boulaq 18 (smaller manuscript) ===
The Papyrus Boulaq 18 (smaller manuscript) contains a list of entries made by Neferhotep concerning expenditures associated with baking and brewing, dated to Year 6, 1st Peret onwards. It mentions the Chief Scribe of the Vizier, Resseneb and the estate of Vizier Ankhu.

=== Papyrus Brooklyn 35.1446 ===
The Papyrus Brooklyn 35.1446 contains a section drawn up by the noblewoman Senebtisi in order to prove that her late husband, seemingly the vizier Resseneb, had given her ownership of his estate's slaves.

=== Stela of Wepwauthotep ===
The Stela of Wepwauthotep (sealer, overseer of the gs-pr) showing his family, his father Khnumhohtep (mayor, sealer of the god) and mother Itineferu-tahenut; and then his wife Senebhenas, who was the daughter of Ankhu (vizier) and Mereryt, along with her brothers Resseneb (vizier) and Iymeru (vizier).

== Bibliography ==
- William C. Hayes (1955) A Papyrus of the Late Middle Kingdom in the Brooklyn Museum
- Stephen Quirke (1990) The administration of Egypt in the late Middle Kingdom: the hieratic documents
- R B Parkinson (2009) Reading Ancient Egyptian Poetry: Among Other Histories
- Garry J Shaw (2017) War and Trade with the Pharaohs
