= Neferhotep (scribe of the great enclosure) =

Egyptian official

Neferhotep (fl. c. 1750 BC) was an ancient Egyptian official with the title scribe of the great enclosure. He lived during the 13th Dynasty. His tomb was found in 1860 by Auguste Mariette in Dra Abu el-Naga and contained many objects, most notably of which was the Papyrus Boulaq 18, which is an account of life in the Theban palace. The papyrus had already been published, but the finds in Neferhotep's tomb have only recently been fully published. The tomb contained the rishi coffin of Neferhotep, which was most likely already badly decayed when Mariette found it and it and the mummy has now completely disappeared, with the coffin's appearance known only from Mariette's report. Other finds in the tomb are a walking stick, a head rest, a faience hippopotamus, wooden pieces of the Hounds and Jackals game, a mace, writing implements, a wooden tray for a mirror, two calcite vessels, a magical wand, and a double scarab.

There are few well-preserved tomb groups of this period, giving this find a special importance. Furthermore, this is the earliest tomb group with a rishi coffin that can be dated. Normally, rishi coffins are associated with the 17th Dynasty (about 100 years later), but Neferhotep most likely died in the 13th Dynasty, showing that this coffin type was used earlier than normally thought.

== See also ==
- List of ancient Egyptian scribes

== Literature ==
- Gianluca Miniaci, Stephen Quirke: Reconceiving the Tomb in the Late Middle Kingdom, The Burial of the Account of the Main Enclosure Neferhotep at Dra Abu al-Naga, In: Bulletin de l'Institut Francais d'Archaeologie Orientale, 109 (2009), 339-383
- Gianluca Miniaci, Stephen Quirke: Mariette at Dra Abu el-Naga and the tomb of Neferhotep: a mid-13th dynasty coffin (?), In: Egitto e Vicino Oriente, 31 (2008), 1-25
