= Imyremeshaw =

Egyptian pharaoh

- Imyremeshau, Mermeshau, Emramescha'
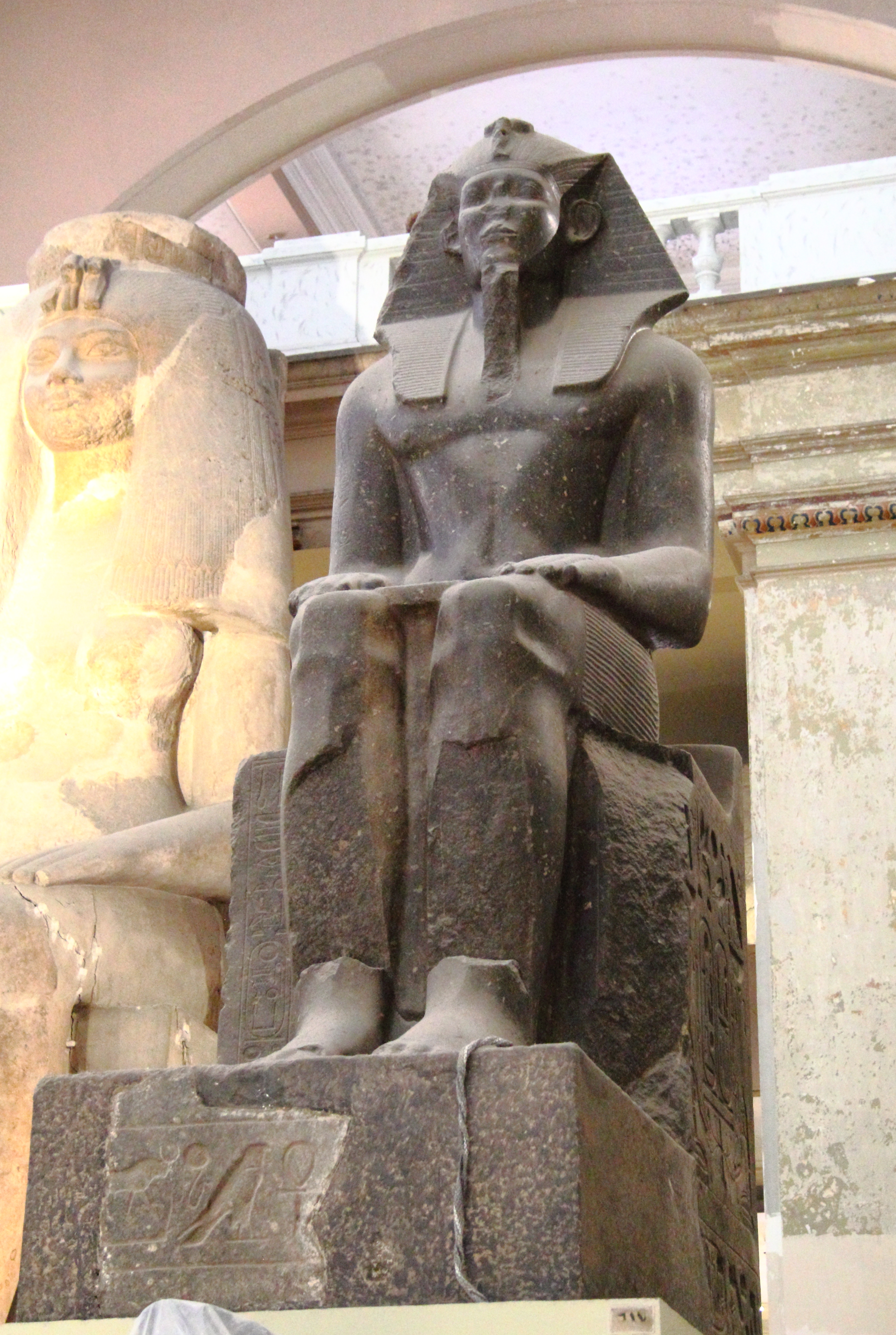
- Granite statue of Imyremeshaw in the Egyptian Museum in Cairo

Pharaoh
- Reign: x years, x months, and 4 days less than 10 years starting 1759 BC; 1711 BC
- Predecessor: Khendjer
- Successor: Sehetepkare Intef
Royal titulary
Prenomen
Smenkhkare
Smnḫ-k3-rˁ
"Vigorous is the Ka of Ra"
M23 t L2 t < ra s mn n x U22 kA >
Turin canon
[Smenkh]kare
[Smnḫ]-k3-rˁ
"Smenkhkare"
< N5 HASH D28 Z1 G7 > G7
Nomen
Imyremeshaw
Imy-r-mšˁw
"General" or "Overseer of troops"
G39 N5 < m&r A12 Z2 >
Turin canon
Imyremeshaw
Imy-r-mšˁw
"The general"
m&r A12 Z2
- Consorts: uncertain, possibly Queen Aya
- Monuments: uncertain, possibly an unfinished pyramid at Saqqara neighboring that of Khendjer
- Dynasty: 13th Dynasty

Smenkhkare Imyremeshaw was a minor king of the early 13th Dynasty during the late Middle Kingdom. He apparently had a short reign and is mainly attested in the Memphis-Faiyum region in Egypt.

== Attestations ==
Imyremeshaw is mainly attested in the Memphis-Faiyum region.

=== Pair of Colossi, Cairo JE 37466 and JE 37467 ===
At Memphis (?), Imyremeshaw was attested by a pair of colossi dedicated to Ptah "He who is south of his wall, Lord of Ankhtawy" (rsy-ínb=f nb ˁnḫt3wy). This is a Memphite epithet indicating that the statues must originally have been set up in the temple of Ptah in Memphis.

During the 15th Dynasty, the colossi were moved to Avaris by the Hyksos ruler Aqenenre Apepi, during the Second Intermediate Period. Apepi added his name and a dedication to "Seth, Lord of Avaris" on the right shoulder of each statue.

In the 19th Dynasty, during the New Kingdom, both colossi were moved to Pi-Ramesses by Ramses II who also had his name inscribed on them, together with a further dedication to Seth.

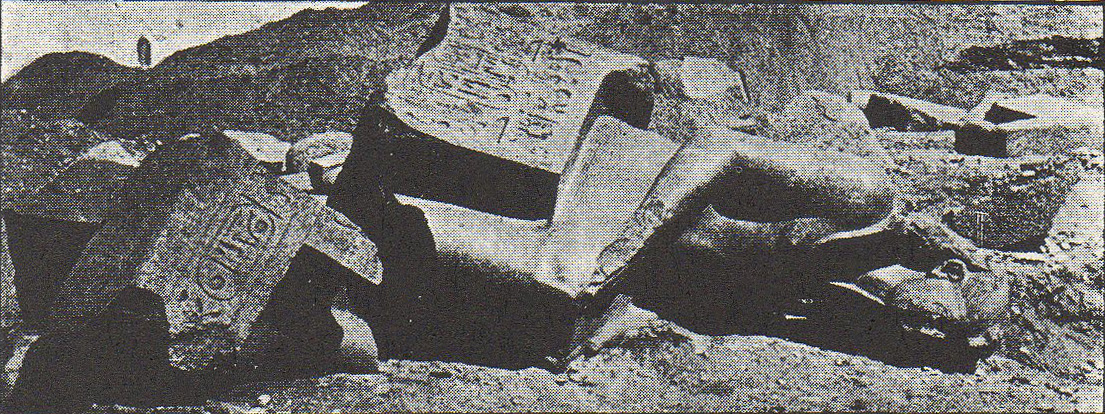
Syenite statue of Imyremeshaw photographed by Flinders Petrie during his excavations at Tanis

Finally, during the 21st Dynasty the statues were moved to Tanis. Here, the colossi remained until the 1897 excavations under the direction of Flinders Petrie.

=== Bead, BM EA 74185 ===
Of Unknown Provenance, a white steatite bead bearing the inscription "The good god, Smenkhkare, beloved of Sobek, Lord of Shedyt". Egyptologists Darrell Baker and Kim Ryholt propose that the reference to Shedyt (Faiyum), a town close to the Memphis region, on the bead could indicate that the bead originates from this location.

=== Statuette, Cairo JE 54493 (weak) ===
At Saqqara South, the torso of a statuette was found in an unfinished pyramid dated to the 13th Dynasty. W. Davis (1981) proposed that the statuette belonged to a "close successor of Khendjer" which could be Imyremeshaw. The fragment however is uninscribed and Davies' identification of the owner of the statuette as Imyremeshaw is based solely "on grounds of provenance".

== Non-Contemporary Attestations ==
The Turin King List column 7:21 reads "The Dual King ...kara Imyremeshaw, [x years, x months, and] 4 days". In the list Imyremeshaw is preceded by Userkare Khendjer (7:19) and succeeded by Sehotepkare Intef (7:22).

== Theories ==
=== Name ===
The nomen of Imyremeshaw is a well attested name in use during the Second Intermediate Period and means "Overseer of troops" or "General". For this reason, it has been assumed without further evidence that Imyremeshaw was a general before becoming king. Following this hypothesis, egyptologists Alan Gardiner and William Hayes translated the entry of the Turin canon referring to Imyremeshaw as "Smenkhkare the General", i.e. understanding Imyremeshaw as a title rather than a name. Jürgen von Beckerath proposes that Imyremeshaw was of foreign origin and had a foreign name that could not be understood by the Egyptians and thus became known to them by his military title. Furthermore, Imyremeshaw did not use any filiative nomina—that is, he was apparently not related to his predecessor Khendjer and certainly of non-royal birth. Thus, scholars suggested that he may have come to power by orchestrating a military coup against his predecessor Khendjer.

Baker and Ryholt contest this hypothesis. They point to the lack of evidence for a military coup as one cannot rule out an usurpation by political means. Additionally, they note that Imyremeshaw was a common personal name at the time. Similar common names based on titles include Imyrikhwe (literally "Overseer of cattle"), Imyreper ("Steward") and Imyrekhenret ("Overseer of the compound"). For these reasons, Stephen Quirke suggests that the name of Imyremeshaw may simply reflect a family tradition and Ryholt adds that it could indicate a family with a military background.

=== Chronological position and reign length ===
The exact chronological position of Imyremeshaw in the 13th Dynasty is not known for certain owing to uncertainties affecting earlier kings of the dynasty. According to the Turin canon, Imyremeshaw was the immediate successor of Khendjer. Baker makes him the twenty-second king of the dynasty, Ryholt sees him as the twenty-third king and Jürgen von Beckerath places him as the eighteenth pharaoh of the dynasty.

The exact duration of the reign of Imyremeshaw is mostly lost in a lacuna of the Turin canon and cannot be recovered, except for the end: "[and] 4 days". Ryholt proposes that the combined reigns of Imyremeshaw and his two successors Sehetepkare Intef and Seth Meribre amount to about 10 years. Another piece of evidence concerning the reign of Imyremeshaw is found in the 13th Dynasty Papyrus Boulaq 18 which reports, among other things, the composition of a royal family comprising ten king's sisters, an unspecified number of king's brothers, three daughters of the king, a son named Redienef and a queen named Aya. Even though the king's name is lost in a lacuna, Ryholt's analysis of the papyrus only leaves Imyremeshaw and Sehetepkare Intef as possibilities. This is significant because the papyrus reports a year 3 and a year 5 dates for this king. Additionally, a date "regnal year 5, 3rd month of Shemu, 18th day" is known from the unfinished pyramid complex neighboring that of Khendjer known as Southern South Saqqara pyramid, which may thus have been built by the same person, perhaps Imyremeshaw.

The exact circumstances of the end of Imyremeshaw's reign are unknown but the fact that his successor Sehetepkare Intef did not use filiative nomina points to a non-royal birth. Consequently, Ryholt proposes that Intef may have usurped the throne.

Imyremeshaw reigned from Memphis, starting in 1759 BC or 1711 BC. The length of his reign is not known for certain; he may have reigned for five years and certainly less than ten years.

Preceded by Khendjer	Pharaoh of Egypt; Thirteenth Dynasty	Succeeded by Sehetepkare Intef
