= Rehuankh =

Ancient Egyptian high official

- King's Acquaintance
- Dynasty: 13th dynasty
- Pharaoh: Neferhotep I, Sobekhotep IV
- Mother: Lady of the House, Pepiu {nbt pr ppw}
- Wife: Lady of the House, Dedet-Ankhet {ddt-'nqt}

Rehuankh was an Ancient Egyptian high official associated with kings Neferhotep I and Sobekhotep IV of the Thirteenth Dynasty during the Middle Kingdom. Rehuankh is known from a high number of sources, making him one of the best attested officials of the late Middle Kingdom.

== Biography ==
=== Career ===
==== King's Acquaintance ====
As "King's Acquaintance" he worked together with King's Acquaintance Senen and King's Acquaintance Nebankh under the leadership of treasurer Senebi.

==== High Steward ====
Towards the end of the Thirteenth Dynasty, he might have become high steward for a short period. However, this attestation is weak with only the same name being on the monument.

== Attestations ==
At Wadi el-Hudi, Rehuankh is known from inscriptions. He appears on a stela as part of the staff of treasurer Senebi. As high steward he is known from a statue.

Stela, Berlin ÄM 7311 | Memphis/Faiyum | along with King's Acquaintance Renseneb and Interior Overseer of the Inner Palace Seneb. This limestone round-topped stela derives from the MFR - 13th Dyn. Memphis-Faiyum Workshop 3.

Stela, Cairo CG 20104 | Abydos | King's Acquaintance Rehuankh, along with other people. A collection of finds from the Abydos North Cemetery. This limestone round-topped stela derives from Thebes - 13th Dyn. Theban Workshop 4.

Stela, Cairo CG 20147 | Abydos |

Stela, Cairo CG 20614 | Abydos | King's Acquaintance Rehuankh, along with Treasurer Senebi, King's Acquaintance Senen, King's Acquaintance Khnumu and King's Acquaintance Kuku, King's Acquaintance Renseneb, Interior Overseer of the Inner Palace Seneb etc.

Stela, Wadi el-Hudi 24 | In Wadi el-Hudi, a granite round-topped stela dated to Year 6 of Sobekhotep IV with King's Acquaintance Rehuankh along with Interior Overseer of the Inner Palace Seneb. Wadi el-Hudi is about 35 km southeast of Aswan where expeditions went to the amethyst quarries, a purple stone used for jewelry.

Stela, Wien ÄS 140 | along with Treasurer Senebi and Interior Overseer of the Inner Palace Seneb.

Statue, Georges Oyex Basel (weak) | with the title High Steward.
