= Senebhenas =

Ancient Egyptian queen consort

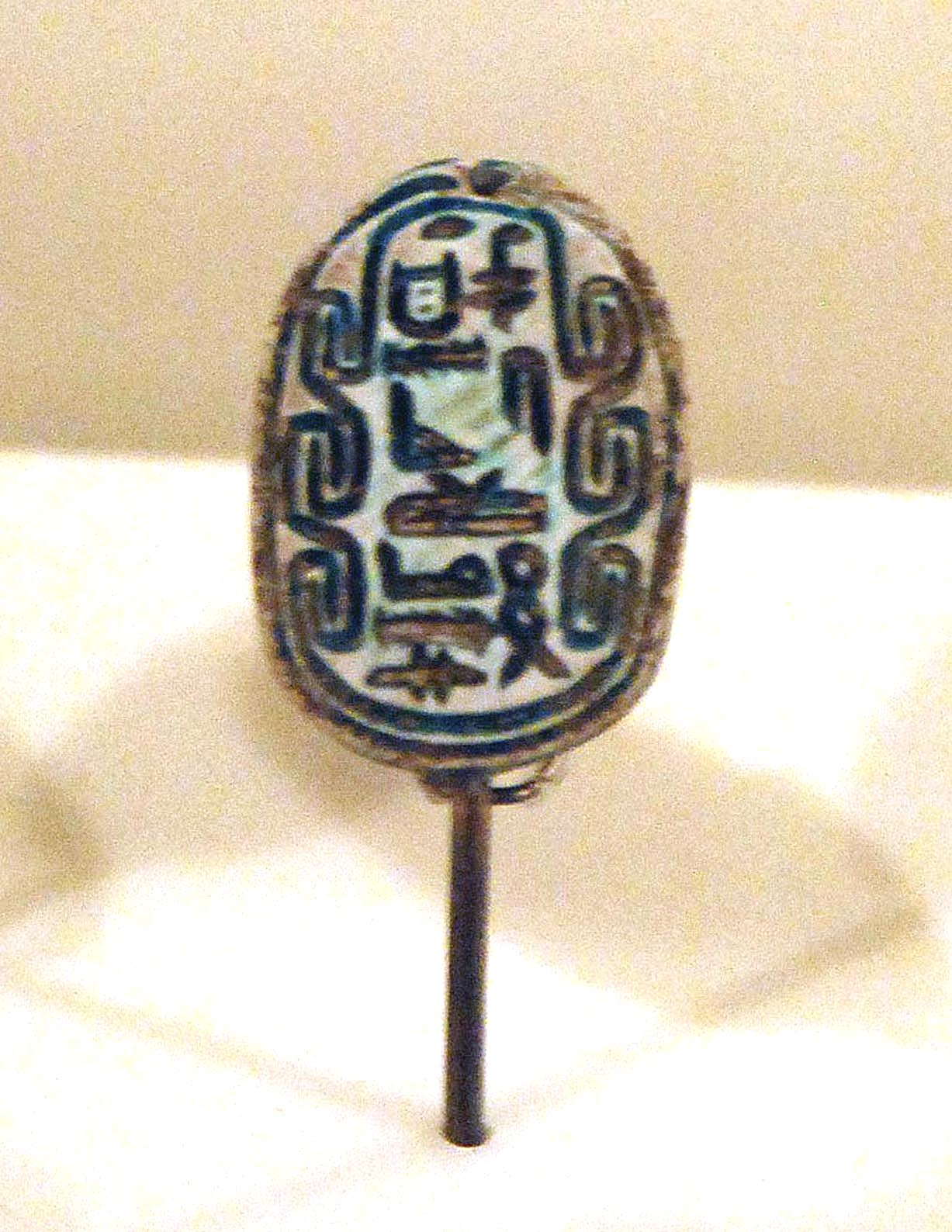
Scarab seal of Senebhenas

Senebhenas (snb-ḥnˁ=s, "Health is with her") was the wife and queen consort of the ancient Egyptian king Sobekhotep III, who reigned in the 13th Dynasty, about 1750 BC.

== Attestations ==
The queen is mainly known from a rock stela in the Wadi el-Hol. Here she bears a long title string, including the titles lady of all lands, king's wife and united with the white crown. There she is shown standing behind the king's mother Jewhetibew, indicating that she was the main wife of the king, as a second wife with the name Neni is also known and shown behind her.
