= Sobekemsaf (13th Dynasty) =

Egyptian official

- Reporter, Reporter of Thebes; Overseer of the granaries
- Statue of Sobekemsaf in Vienna
Egyptian name
I3 A1 m V16 Z2 f
- Dynasty: Thirteenth Dynasty (late); Seventeenth Dynasty (early); Second Intermediate Period
- Father: Dedusobek Bebi (Senior Scribe of the Vizier; Chief of the Tens of Upper Egypt)
- Mother: Duatnofert (Lady of the House)
- Siblings: Nubkhaes (Senior King's Wife); Nebankh (Sealbearer of the God at Abydos)

Sobekemsaf was an ancient Egyptian official of the late Thirteenth Dynasty or early Seventeenth Dynasty, in the Second Intermediate Period. He is especially well known from his statue in Vienna.

== Family ==
Sobekemsaf (sbk-m-sꜣ⸗f “Sobek is his protection”) came from an influential family. His father was the senior scribe of the vizier and later Chief of the Upper Tens, Dedusobek Bebi. His mother was a certain Lady of the House, Duanofert. His uncle Nebankh, the brother of his father was high steward under Sobekhotep IV in the late 13th Dynasty, and therefore one of the most influential officials at the royal court. The sister of Sobekemsaf was the queen Nubkhaes. She evidently managed to marry into the royal family, or her husband managed to become king. Albeit her royal husband is not yet identified for sure.

His family is listed in Stela Louvre C 13.

- Mother (mwt⸗s): nbt pr dwꜣt-nfrt. (Duat-Neferet)
- Father (jtj⸗s): wr mḏw šmꜥw ddw-sbk/bbj (Dedusobek/Bebi)
- Maternal Grandmother (mwt nt mwt⸗s): nbt pr ḥmw.
- Paternal Uncle (sn n jtj⸗s): ḫtmw-bjtj; jmj-rꜣ pr-wr; šmsw (n) nsw nb-ꜥnḫ. (High Steward Nebankh)

Siblings

- Brother (sn⸗s): ḫtmw-bjtj; sš ꜥ n nsw n ḫft-ḥr nb-swmnw. (King's Scribe Nebsumenu)
- Brother (sn⸗s): sꜣb; rꜣ-nḫn sbk-ḥtp. (King's Acquaintance Sobekhotep)
- Brother (sn⸗s): ḫtmw-nṯr n ꜣbḏw nb-ꜥnḫ. (Sealbearer of the God of Abydos, Nebankh)
- Brother (sn⸗s): sbk-m-ḥꜣt.
- Sister (snt⸗s): nbt pr nbw-m-ḥb.
- Sister (snt⸗s): nbt pr nbw-m-ꜣḫt.
- Sister (snt⸗s): nbt pr nbt⸗j-m-nbw.
- Sister (snt⸗s): nbt pr nfrw-sbk.
- Sister (snt⸗s): nbt pr nb⸗j-pw.
- Sister (snt⸗s): jrjt-pꜥt; ḥmt-nsw wrt; ẖnmt nfr ḥḏt nbw-ḫꜥ⸗s (Queen Nubkhaes)

== Attestation ==
Sobekemsaf (PD 563) appears on several monuments. They include a stela now in the Louvre in Paris (C13), a statue in Berlin (Inv. no. 2285), a stela in the Egyptian Museum in Cairo (CG 20763) and the almost lifesize statue today in Vienna, in the Kunsthistorisches Museum (inv. no. 5801). The base of the statue is in Dublin National Museum of Ireland, Reg. No. 1889.503. On his monuments Sobekemsaf bears two titles. On the stelae in Cairo and Vienna as well as on the statue in Berlin he bears the title overseer of the granaries. On the statue in Vienna he has the title Reporter of Thebes (wHmw n w3st), being evidently promoted in the between times.

=== Overseer of the Double Granary ===
==== Cairo CG 20763 ====
A limestone stela fragment with various people. It it includes (no title) Sobekemsaf and his brother Sealbearer of the God of Abydos, Nebankh and two sisters.

==== Stela Louvre C 13 ====
At Abydos, a limestone round-topped stela of Great King's Wife Nubkhaes. It mentions her family members, including her father Chief of the Tens of Upper Egypt, Dedusobek/Bebi, and her brother Overseer of the Double Granary, Sobekemsaf. Also mentioned is her uncle High Steward, Nebankh. Both her father and uncle had previously served under king Sobekhotep IV in the late 13th Dynasty, see Stela Wadi el-Hudi 25. Another brother is Sealbearer of the God of Abydos, Nebankh.

==== Berlin ÄM 2285 ====
A granodiorite statue of man seated on the ground of Overseer of the Double Granary, Sobekemsaf. It mentions his father Chief of the Tens of Upper Egypt, Bebi (Dedusobek/Bebi).

=== Reporter of Thebes ===
==== Statue Wien ÄS 5051/5801 ====
At Armant, a granodiorite statue of man standing of Reporter and Reporter of Waset (Thebes), Sobekemsaf. Son of Chief of the Tens of Upper Egypt, Dedusobek/Bebi and Lady of the House, Duat-Neferet.

The Vienna statue is an important, high quality artwork. Its dating was for a long time under discussion. It was known that Sobekemsaf is the brother of a queen Nubkhaes. However, there is also a queen with the same name, known as the wife of the 17th Dynasty king Sobekemsaf II. Therefore, it was an open question whether the statue and Sobekemsaf belong to the 13th or 17th Dynasty. However, today, there is a general agreement, that Sobekemsaf dates to the 13th Dynasty, shortly after Sobekhotep IV, as most of his family members are datable around this reign.
