= Senebsen =

Senebsen was an Ancient Egyptian queen and wife of king Neferhotep I during the 13th Dynasty.

== Attestations ==
She is mentioned in a rock inscription on the Sehel Island where members of the king's family are listed (but not the king himself). Otherwise she is mentioned on a scarab and in a tomb at Elkab, where there is also mentioned her daughter Neferhotep.

=== Seal Berlin ÄM 32630 ===
A steatite scarab seal of a servant of Senebsen. Her titles are title King's Wife and United with the White Crown.

=== Rock Inscription SEH 162 ===
With the title King's Wife. She is mentioned after the parents of Neferhotep I, before his brothers and children. The monument also named King's Acquaintance Nebankh (PD 294) and Treasurer Senebi (PD 634).

=== Tomb Elkab Tomb 64 (9) ===
With the title King's Wife. Here she is identified as the mother of jrjt-p't Neferhotep (married to imi-ra gs-pr Resseneb), who in turn was the mother of Hatshepsut, mother of Ini.
