= Dedusobek Bebi =

High official in ancient Egypt

- Great Scribe of the Vizier
- Dynasty: Thirteenth Dynasty
- Spouse: Duatnefret
- Father: Sobekhotep
- Mother: Hapyu
- Siblings: Nebankh
- Children: Nubkhaes

Dedusobek Bebi (ddw-sbk bbỉ) was a high official of the late Thirteenth Dynasty of ancient Egypt. He became the "Great Scribe of the Vizier" (ss wr n t3ty). This position was directly under the Vizier acting as a deputy.

== Family ==
He was the son of "steward" Sobekhotep and born to Hapyu. His brother was Nebankh who was "king's acquaintance" under Neferhotep I and high steward under Sobekhotep IV.

=== Wife and Children ===
His wife was Lady of the House, Duatnefret. He was the father of queen Nubkhaes who was married to an unnamed king. She may have been buried along with king Sobekemsaf II. An important son was "Reporter of Thebes", Sobekemsaf. Another important son of Dedusobek Bebi was the "royal sealer" and "scribe of the personal scribe of the royal board" Nebsumenu.

== Attestations ==
The name Dedusobek-Bebi (PD765) may also appear in literature as Sobekdedu-Bebi.

Dedusobek is known from several sources.

[1] At Thebes, a statue of Sobekemsaf mentions "the Great One of the Tens of Upper Egypt, Dedusobek Bebi" as his father.

[2] A fragmentary base of a statue of unknown provenance mentions "the Great One of the Tens of Upper Egypt, Dedusobek Bebi, true of [voice]".

[3] Stele of Bebi (Louvre 88): He is attested as the Great Scribe of the Vizier.

[4] At Abydos (?), he is attested as the Great Scribe of the Vizier on a stela with a hymn to Osiris. It mentions Dédousobek (great scribe of the vizier); Bébi (nickname); Sebekhetep (father); Hepyou (mother); Osiris-Khenty-Imentyou (Abydos); Osiris; Nut; Atum; Heliopolis; Busiris; Ennead
