= Sobekhotep III =

Egyptian king

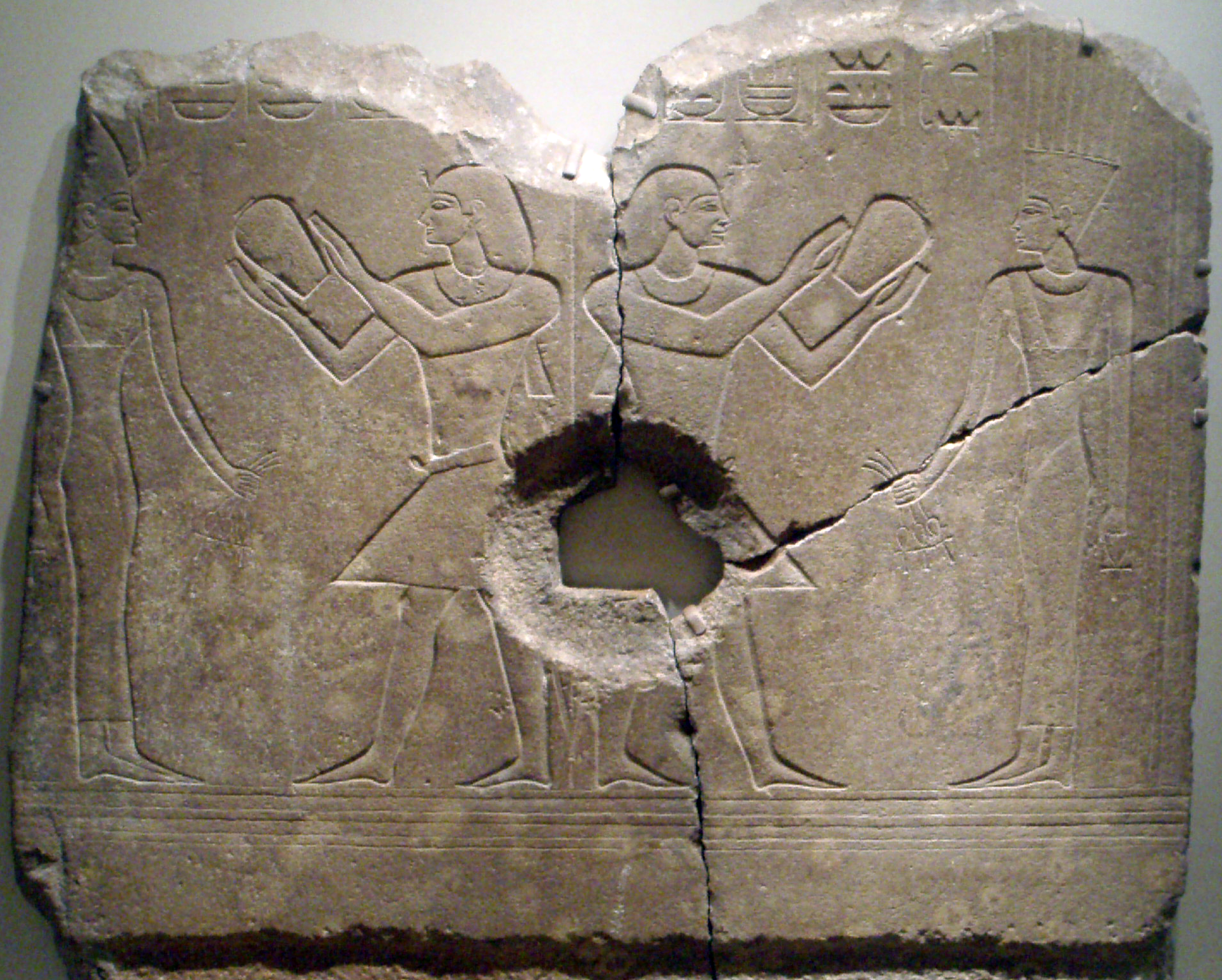
- Sobekhotep III worshipping Satet (left) and Anuket (right). The central hole was made when the relief was used as a grinding stone, long after the original carving. Now on display at the Brooklyn Museum.

Pharaoh
- Reign: 4 years, 2 months, x days c. 1740 BC or 1700 BC; Second Intermediate Period; Middle Bronze Age
- Predecessor: Seth Meribre
- Successor: Neferhotep I
Royal titulary
Horus name
Khutawy
ḫwj-t3wj
He who protects the Two Lands
G5	D44 N19
Nebty name
Khaiemsekhemef
ḫˁj-m-sḫm=f
He appears in its power
G16	xa a sxm m&f
Golden Horus
Hetep-her-maat
ḥtp-ḥr-m3ˁt
Maat is Satisfied
G8	G8 mDAt Hr Z1 mAat
Prenomen
Sekhemre Sewadjtawy
Sḫm-Rˁ sw3ḏ-t3wj
A powerful one, who allows the Two Lands to thrive

M23 X1 L2 X1	ra sxm s wAD N19
Nomen
Sobekhotep
Sbk ḥtp
Sobek is satisfied

G39 N5	sbk Htp t p
- Consorts: Senebhenas, Neni
- Children: Iuhetibu Fendy ♀, Dedetanqet ♀
- Father: Mentuhotep
- Mother: Iuhetibu
- Dynasty: 13th Dynasty

Sekhemre Sewadjtawy Sobekhotep III was an Egyptian king of the mid Thirteenth Dynasty of Egypt who reigned four years.

== Family ==
=== Parents and siblings ===
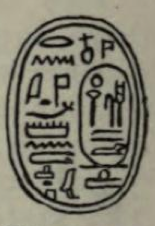
Scarab of Sobekhotep III giving the name of his father, god's father Mentuhotep.

The family of the king is known from several sources. A monument from Sehel Island shows Sobekhotep with his father Mentuhotep, his mother was king's mother Iuhetibu (Yauheyebu), his brothers Seneb and Khakau, and a half-sister called Reniseneb. Reniseneb was a daughter of Iuhetibu and her second husband Dedusobek.

=== Wife and children ===
Sobekhotep III had two wives, Senebhenas and Neni. A stela from Koptos (Qift), now in the Louvre (C 8), mentions the daughters of Neni: Iuhetibu Fendy and Dedetanqet. Iuhetibu Fendy wrote her name in a cartouche. This is the second time in Egyptian history that a king's daughter received this honor.

Senebhenas is shown with Sobekhotep on an altar in Sehel Island and a stela in Wadi el-Hol. The stela depicts Sobekhotep III before the god Monthu. He receives an ankh and a was-scepter from the god. Sobekhotep is followed by his father Montuhotep, his mother Iuhetibu, and his wife Senebhenas.

== Early life ==
A number of scarab seals have been found that were from an officier of the ruler's table Sobekhotep begotten of the officier of the ruler's table Mentuhotep. It is possible that these seals belonged to Sobekhotep III before he became king.

== Reign ==
Sobekhotep III is known from many objects despite the fact that the Turin King List gives him a reign of only four years and two to four months in length. He added inscriptions to the temple of Menthu at Madamud and built a chapel at El Kab. On Sehel an altar with his name was found.

Sobekhotep III was the first of a group of Thirteenth Dynasty kings about whom there exists historical records. This group of Thirteenth Dynasty kings are all known from many objects. These kings produced many seals and there are many private monuments that can be dated to these reigns. This would seem to indicate that Egypt was relatively stable during this period.

== Attestations ==
The main attestations of Sobekhotep III are found in Upper Egypt. Only small finds (tradables) are attested in Lower Egypt and Nubia. For a full list, see Ryholt 1997:343-44 File 13/26 Sobekhotep III is also indirectly attested by monuments owned by people associated with him.

=== Lower Egypt ===
- At Saqqara, a scarab-seal. The seal is said to be from Saqqara.
- At Lisht, seal-impressions (2) and scarab-seals (2).

=== Upper Egypt ===
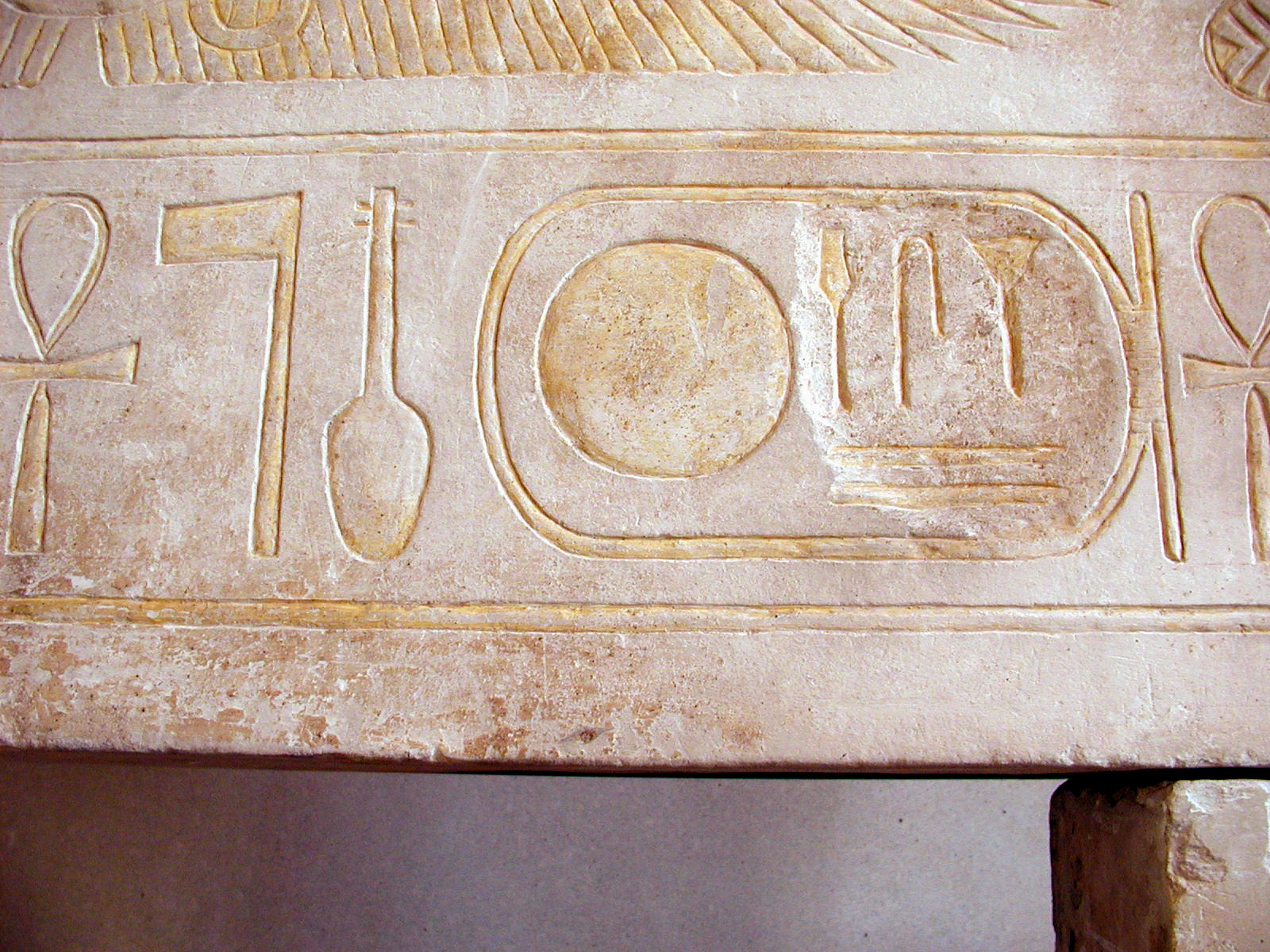
Louvre E 13891 with Cartouche of Sobekhotep III (usurped)

- At Abydos, a scarab-seal.
- At Koptos, a stela of two king's daughters and a scarab-seal.
- At Wadi el-Hol, a rock-inscription (family list).
- At Medamud, architectural elements (usurped). One base of a colossal statue was later reused by Sobekemsaf II.
- At Gebelein, a stela of Iufseneb with the royal name of Sobekhotep III. The father of Iufseneb was a governor with the title string ḥꜣtj-ꜥ; ḫtmw-bjtj; smr-wꜥtj n mrwt; ḥꜣtj-ꜥ n [...] [...].

=== Nubia ===
At the fortress of Mirgissa (Nubia), a scarab-impression with the royal name of Sobekhotep III and the King's Mother Iuhetibu. Also a seal-impression with the name Sekhemre Sewadjtawy, a seal with two impressions.

=== Non-contemporary attestation ===
==== Karnak King List ====
The Karnak King List does not mention Sobekhotep III in its preserved cartouches.

==== Turin King List ====
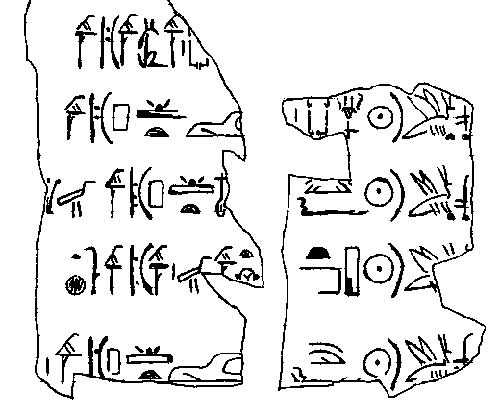
Sobekhotep's name on the Turin canon (second row from top)

The Turin King List 7:24 contains the entry: "The Dual King Sekhem[ka]re Wadjtawy Sobekhotep, 4 years, 2 months x days" (nsw-bit sḫm-kꜢ-rꜤ wꜢḏ-tꜢ.wy sbk-ḥtp rnpt 4 Ꜣbd 2 hrw x). In the list, Sekhemre Wadjtawy Sobekhotep is preceded by [Mer]ib[ra] ...Seth (7:23) and succeeded by Khasekhemre Neferhotep, son of Haankhef (7:25).

== See also ==
- List of pharaohs

== Bibliography ==
- K.S.B. Ryholt, The Political Situation in Egypt during the Second Intermediate Period, c. 1800-1550 BC, (Carsten Niebuhr Institute Publications, vol. 20. Copenhagen: Museum Tusculanum Press, 1997), 343-44, File 13/26.

Preceded by Seth Meribre	Pharaoh of Egypt; Thirteenth Dynasty	Succeeded by Neferhotep I
