= Nubkhaes =

Egyptian queen

- Great Royal Wife
- Stela of Queen Nubkhaes in the Louvre
- Issue: Khonsoukhoufsy Renseneb (daughter); Bebires (daughter); Douatnefret (daughter)
- Father: Dedusobek Bebi
- Mother: Duatnofret

nbw xa a z
Nubkhaes
in hieroglyphs
Era: 2nd Intermediate Period
(1650–1550 BC)

Nubkhaes {nbw-ḫꜥ⸗s} was a queen in ancient Egypt during the Second Intermediate Period. Several of her family members were officials during the late 13th Dynasty. Her name means The Gold [=Hathor] appears and she held the titles Great Royal Wife and the one united with the beauty of the white crown.

She is so far only known from her family stela now in the Louvre and a few later references. The stela is the main monument of the queen. Here is mentioned her father Dedusobek Bebi and other family members, many of them high court officials. These are all datable to about the time of king Sobekhotep IV. The husband of the queen is not mentioned on the stela, but it is assumed that he was one of the successors of Sobekhotep IV, as his wife is known and Nubkhaes belongs to a generation after Sobekhotep IV. Khonsoukhoufsy Renseneb was a daughter of the queen. She married a vizier coming from Elkab.

== Family ==
Sobekhotep	Hapyu
Nebankh	Dedusobek Bebi	Duatnofret
Unknown king	Nubkhaes	Sobekemsaf
Douatnefret	Bebires	Khonsoukhoufsy Renseneb	Ay

== Attestation ==
This queen is only attested in Upper Egypt between Thebes and Elephantine. However, she comes from a family who is well attested. At Thebes, Sobekemsaf II is said to have been buried with a queen Nubkhaes.

Thebes/Abydos (?), Stela Louvre C 13 | A round-topped stela with five lines of text. as Iripat, Great King's Wife, United with the White Crown. The stela has five lines of offering, offering bread in two scenes to Hathor and Khentimentiu, and two registers with twenty-two names and titles of relatives.

Elephantine, Statue Kaiser, MDAIK 28, 188 | as Great King's Wife

Elkab, Tomb 64 (9) | In this later monument we learn that King's Wife Nubkhaes is the mother of King's Daughter Khonsu who is married to Governor of Elkab Ay. Also mentioned is King's Wife Senebsen, wife of Neferhotep I.

== Theories ==
Aidan Dodson and Dyan Hilton suggest that she was married to either Sobekhotep V, Sobekhotep VI or Wahibre Ibiau.
