= Neferkare Iymeru =

Egyptian vizier

Iymeru Neferkare
- Vizier of Egypt
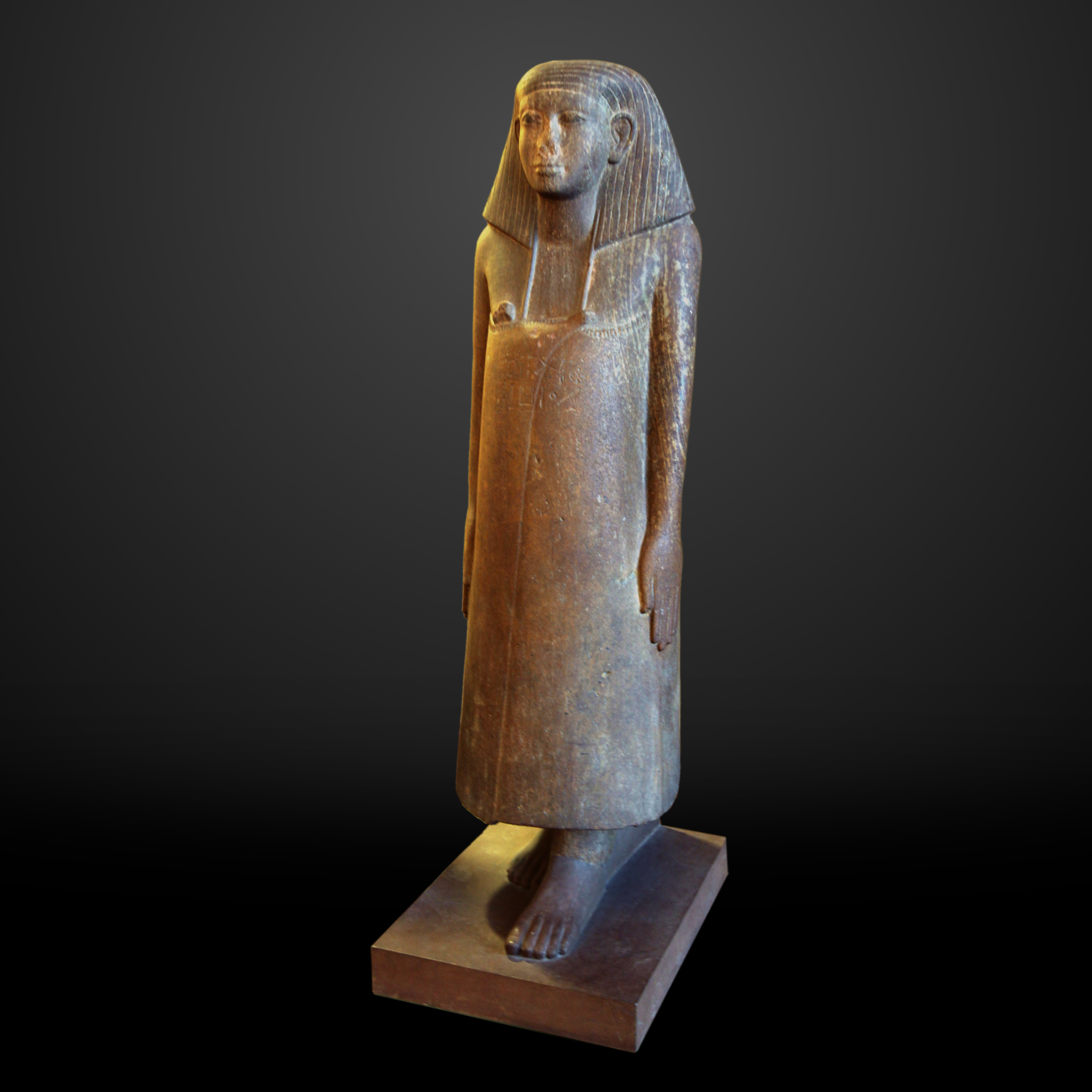
- Statue of Neferkare Iymeru (Louvre A 125) offered to him by King Sobekhotep for the inauguration of a temple for the worship of the king
- Dynasty: 13th Dynasty
- Pharaoh: Sobekhotep IV
- Father: Iymeru (Royal Sealer, Director of the Broad Court)
- Mother: Satamun (King's Sister)

Iymeru Neferkare was the ancient Egyptian vizier under king Sobekhotep IV in the 13th Dynasty, in the Second Intermediate Period.

== Biography ==
Neferkare Iymeru was the son of the leader of the broad hall Iymeru. Neferkare Iymeru himself is known from several monuments, many of them found in Karnak. On a statue now in the Louvre (A 125), he reports the opening of a canal and the building of a temple for king Sobekhotep IV. Other objects belonging to him are a scribe statue, statues found at Elephantine and Kerma, and a stela found in Karnak. He appears in an inscription in the Wadi Hammamat.

=== Career ===
He bore many titles, attested in various surviving pieces of statuary and inscriptions. They are nobleman (jr.j-pꜥ.t), Governor (ḥꜣ.tj-ꜥ), (smr ꜥꜣ n mr.w.t), Overseer of the city (jm.j-rꜣ njw.t), Vizier (ṯꜣ.tj), Overseer of the Six Great Courts (jm.j-rꜣ ḥw.t-wr.t), Great overlord of the land to its limit (ḥr.j-tp n tꜣ r-ḏr⸗f), Master of secrets for the house of life (ḥr.j-sštꜣ n pr-ꜥnḫ), and sab official (sꜣb). Additionally, the title jm.j ḏsr.w ḥr stp-sꜣ has an unknown translation.

=== Family ===
Neferkare Iymeru was the son of Iymeru and Satamun. His father Iymeru held the titles Royal Sealer and Director of the Broad Court/Hall. His mother Satamun held the title King's Sister. Note that his mother did not hold the titles King's Mother or King's Daughter, and her title King's Sister implies that her non-royal brother became king. While the statue is dedicated by Sobekhotep IV, Satamun can have been a sister to a predecessor.

== Attestations ==
Iymeru Neferkare is known by several attestations. Heidelberg 274 links him to Sobekhotep IV, while Louvre A 125 indirectly refers to a monument built for Sobekhotep.

=== Statue, Heidelberg 274 ===
At Karnak, a statue of a man seated on the ground marked with the name of Sobekhotep IV (royal name), belonging to Iymeru and also mentioning his father, Iymeru.

=== Statue, Louvre A 125 ===
A statue/statuette, sandstone, H: 148 cm.

Inscribed Garment A.1: The head of the city, vizier, head of the six courts, Iimeru-Neferkare. {jm,jr'-n',t TA,tj jm,jr'-Hw,t-wr,t-6 [A.2] jj-mr(w)-nfr-kA-ra}.

Back pillar B.1: Given as a favor from the king to Iripat, Hatia, head of the city and head of the six courts, Iimeru-Neferkare, lord of provision, [... ... ...] on the occasion of the opening of the canal and the handover of the house to his master in this house of millions of years (called) "Hetepka-Sobekhotep" [... ... ...]. {rDi(.w) m Hsw,t.(Pl.) nt xr nswt n (j)r(.j)-pa,t HA,tj-a TA,tj jm,jr'-n' ,t jm,jr'-Hw,t-wr,t-6 jj-mrw-nfr-kA-ra nb-jmAx—ca._6Q-- [B.2] xft wbA wr,w rDi.t pr n nb =f m tA Hw,tn.t-HH-n-rnp,t Htp-kA- (cartridge| sbk-Htp |cartridge) --ca._5Q--

=== Rock inscription, Hammamat G 87 ===
At Wadi Hammamat, a rock inscription mentions several people including Vizier Iymeru (PD 26) and High Steward Nebankh (PD 294).

== Theories about his double name ==
Neferkare Iymeru had a double name. Neferkare is the throne name of several Old Kingdom kings, the most famous being Pepy II. Perhaps Neferkare Iymeru was born in Memphis, where this king was still worshipped in the Middle Kingdom.

== Bibliography ==
- Wolfram Grajetzki (2009) Court Officials of the Egyptian Middle Kingdom, p. 38-39 ISBN 978-0-7156-3745-6
- Kim Ryholt (1997) The Political Situation in Egypt During the Second Intermediate Period, C. 1800-1550 B.C, p. 243
