= Khakau (king's son) =

- King's Son
Egyptian name
N28 D28 D28 D28
- Dynasty: 13th Dynasty
- Pharaoh: Sobekhotep III
- Father: Mentuhotep (god's father)
- Mother: Iuhetibu (king's mother)

Khakau (Ancient Egyptian: ḫˁ-kꜣw; also Khakaw) was the brother of King Sobekhotep III of the Thirteenth Dynasty and part of a powerful family taking power in a time of political turmoil in Upper Egypt. Although not of royal birth, he was given the title of "king's son" by his brother.

== Family ==
The father of Khakau was the god's father Mentuhotep. He was born to the king's mother Iuhetibu. His brothers were Sobekhotep III and Seneb. Unlike his two brothers, we do not have much information about his wife and children.

His name, Khakau, reflects the prenomen of Khakaure Senusret III.

== Attestations ==
Khakau is known from several sources in connection with his brother king Sobekhotep III. Khakau bears the title "king's son", although he was not the son of a king. He received the title because his brother had taken the throne and gave royal titles to his family members.

Louvre N 540. Seal/sealing, scarab seal, steatite 24x18x11 mm, s3-nsw h'-h3.w.

Wadi el-Hol, Rock inscription Macadam JEA 37 pl. VI: s3-nsw h’-k3w.

Sehel, Table Wild JEA 37 pl. IV.2: s3-nsw h’-k3w.
