= Neni =

Egyptian queen

D35 n n i B1
Neni
in hieroglyphs
Era: Middle Kingdom
(2055–1650 BC)

Neni was an ancient Egyptian queen of the Thirteenth Dynasty during the Middle Bronze Age.

== Family ==
Parentage. We do not know the name of her parents or if they had any royal connections.

Marriage. Neni married King Sobekhotep III and held the title "King's Wife". She did not hold other known titles, and the title King's Wife may apply to a second rank wife. Her husband may have usurped power and ruler of a short time, meaning that she and her daughter were given royal titles. Her mother-in-law was King's Mother Iuhetibu.

Children. Her two daughters were Iuhetibu Fendy and Dedetanqet. Her daughter Iuhetibu Fendy wrote her name in cartouche indicating she was the royal heiress of her father.

== Attestations ==
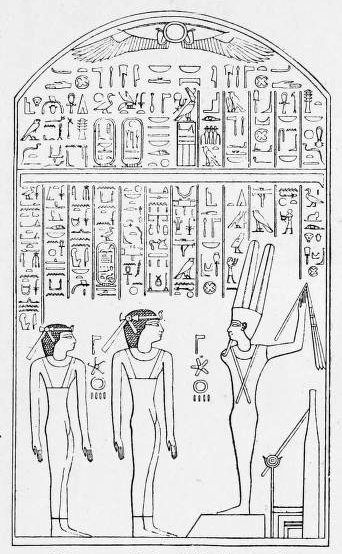
Louvre C 8

She is known from two attestations.

- Leiden V. L. D. J. 3 | At Elephantine, a limestone stela which mentions King's Wife Neni. The stela was set up by her steward (jmj-rꜣ pr n ḥmt-nsw nn ꜥnḫ wḏꜣ snb psš(w)), attesting that Neni had her own estates.
- Louvre C 8 | At Abydos, a limestone stela that mentions Neni (ḥmt-nsw nnj) and her two daughters.
