= Reporter (Ancient Egypt) =

Official in Ancient Egypt

wHm w
wḥmw
The Reporter
in hieroglyphs

The Reporter (or often translated as Herald) (Ancient Egyptian: wḥm.w) was an Ancient Egyptian title. The literal meaning of wḥmw translates to 'one who repeats'. This is generally rendered as 'reporter', 'herald', 'intermediary' or similar. The title first appeared in the Old Kingdom as an honorific of a high official, and later became an administrative function during the Middle Kingdom. In the New Kingdom the role developed an oracular aspect.

== Usage ==
The title wḥmw or 'the Reporter' is attested in royal, bureaucratic and religious settings.

=== Administrative title ===
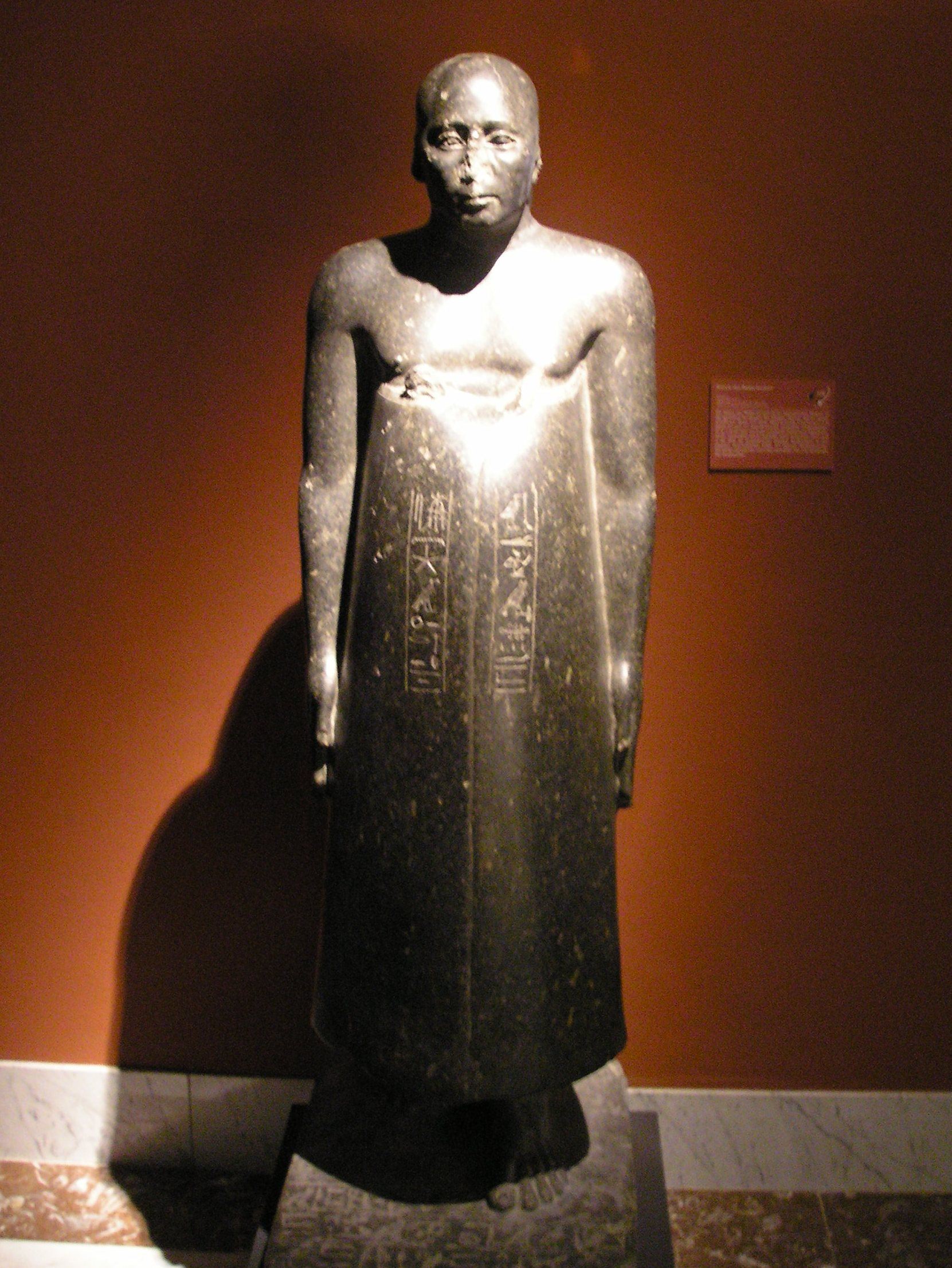
The Reporter of Thebes, Sobekemsaf (13th Dynasty), c. 1700 B.C.

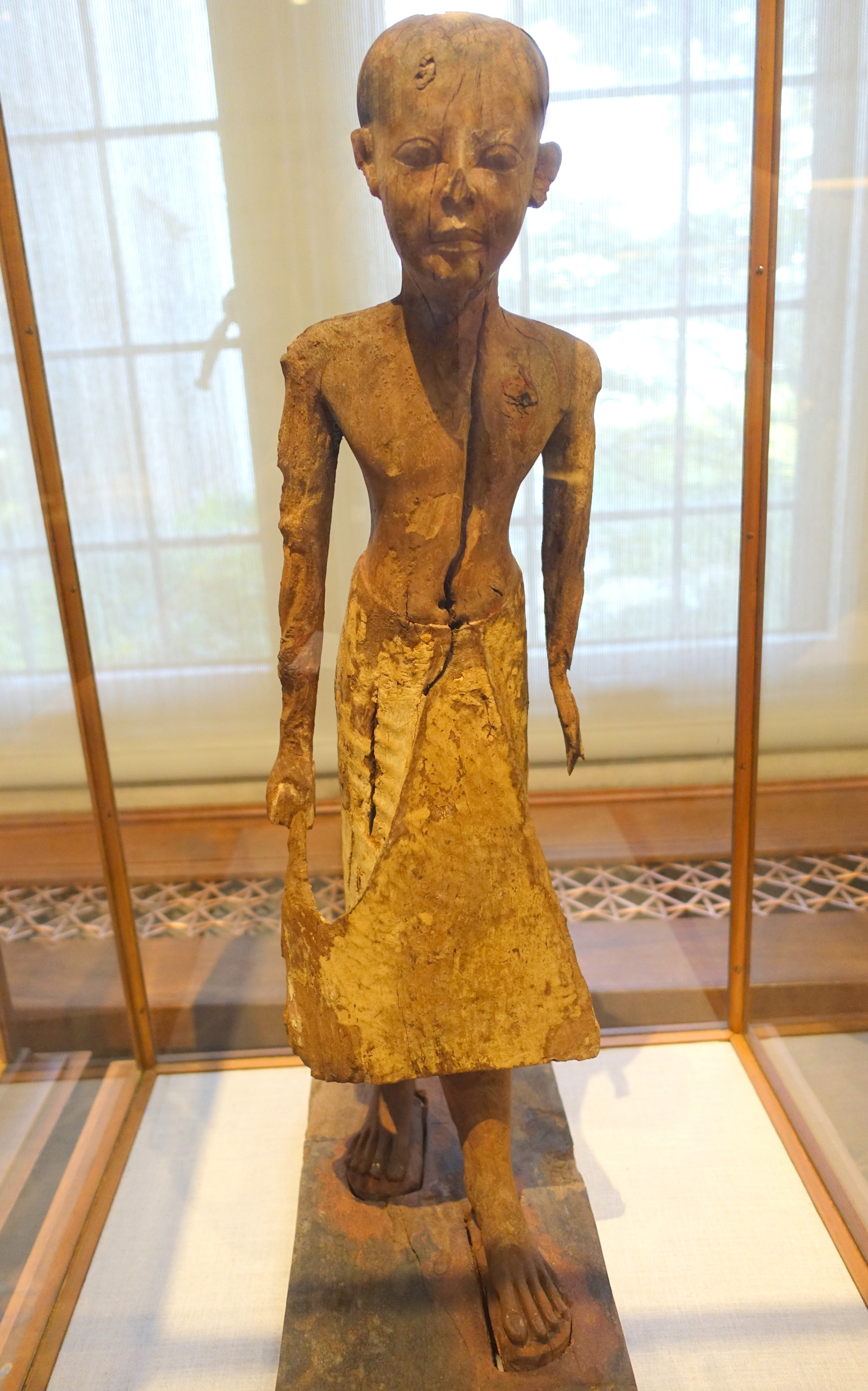
The Royal Herald Nemi, 6th Dynasty, c. 2250 B.C.

The title first appeared in the Old Kingdom as an honorific of an appointed official in the royal court. Faulkner and Gardiner translates wḥmw as 'herald, reporter', suggesting that officials bearing this title by the Middle Kingdom were involved in the dissemination of information within the governmental administration. The title has been attributed to household officials, officials assigned to specific missions and expeditions, as well as ordinary high-ranking local officials of the Middle Kingdom. Occasionally the title "scribe of the reporter" (sš n wḥmw) is attested, suggesting that some had their own staff. The administrative function diminished in importance by the Ramesside period.

=== Religious title ===
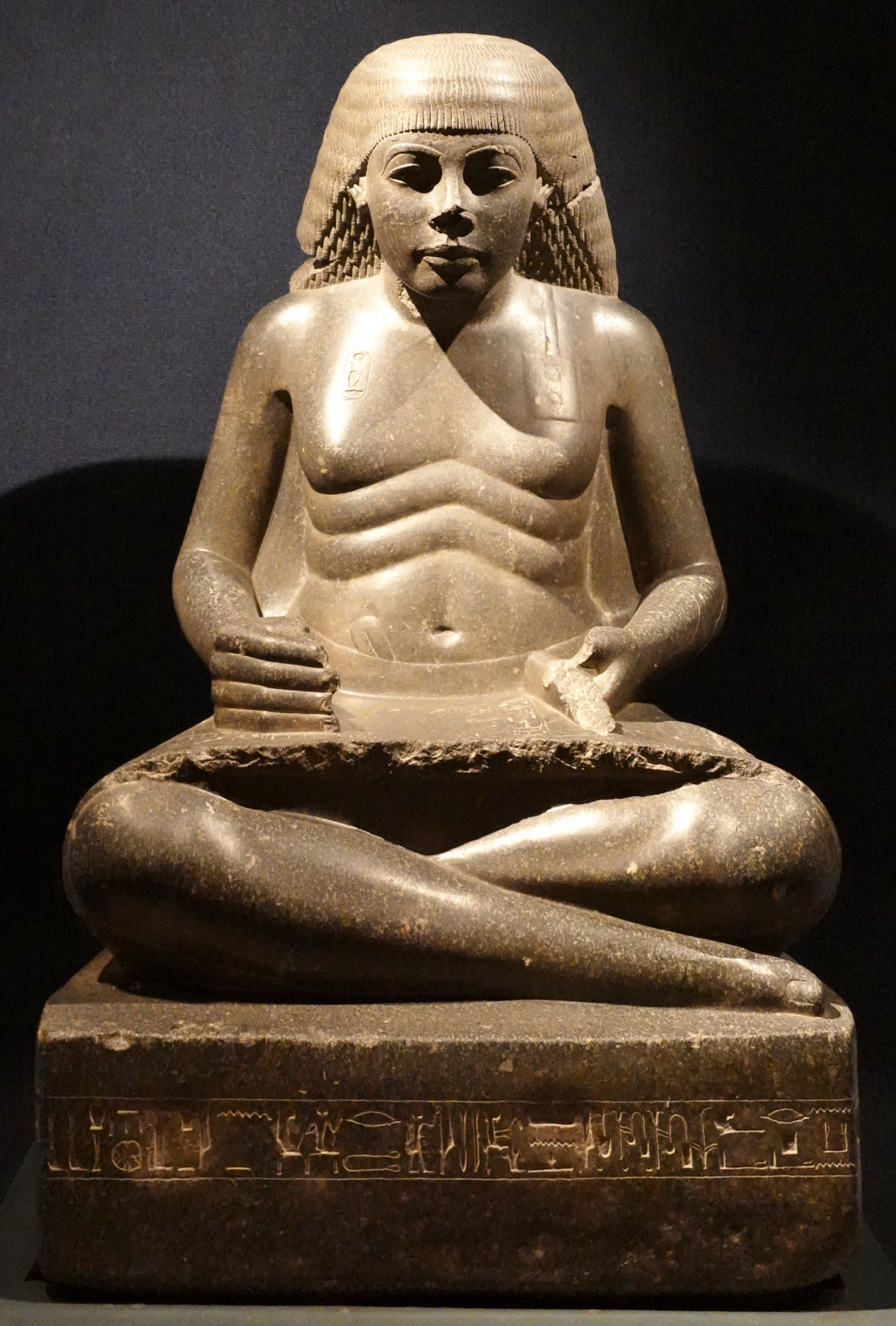
Statue of the Herald Amenhotep, son of Hapu, Luxor Museum, Egypt

The usage of the title within the religious framework relates to the belief of an intermediary between deities and man. Egyptologists Ausec, Otto, Teeter and Harrington translate wḥmw in the religious context as the 'Intermediary'. Galan notes that the operational structure of the title wḥmw and its function within the administrative framework operates in a bidirectional manner, either descending from the king to the people through the herald, or ascending from the people to the king or vizier via the herald. Conversely, within the religious context, the operational structure of the title wḥmw functions unidirectional, solely ascending from the people to the gods through a divine, royal or individual intermediary.

During the New Kingdom, statues were erected in the forecourts of temples in order to intercede for the public who were prohibited from entering the temple proper. These 'intermediary statues' were meant to report requests and petitions to the local gods. A known statue of Amenhotep, son of Hapu (who was posthumously deified), dates back to the reign of Amenhotep III, and reads:

Perform an offering which the king gives for (me)
and libate for me from what you have.
I am a herald (wḥmw) whom the king appointed
in order to hear the petitions of the humble,
in order to bring forward matters of the Two Lands.

— Urk.IV, 1833, 17–19

On another statue, Amenhotep calls himself the 'herald of the god Amun'.

=== Mythology ===
According to the Ancient Egyptian religion, some lesser deities acted as intermediaries between humans and the main deity. One such was the Apis bull, a sacred bull worshiped as the herald of the gods Ptah, Osiris and Atum.
