= Mentuhotep (god's father) =

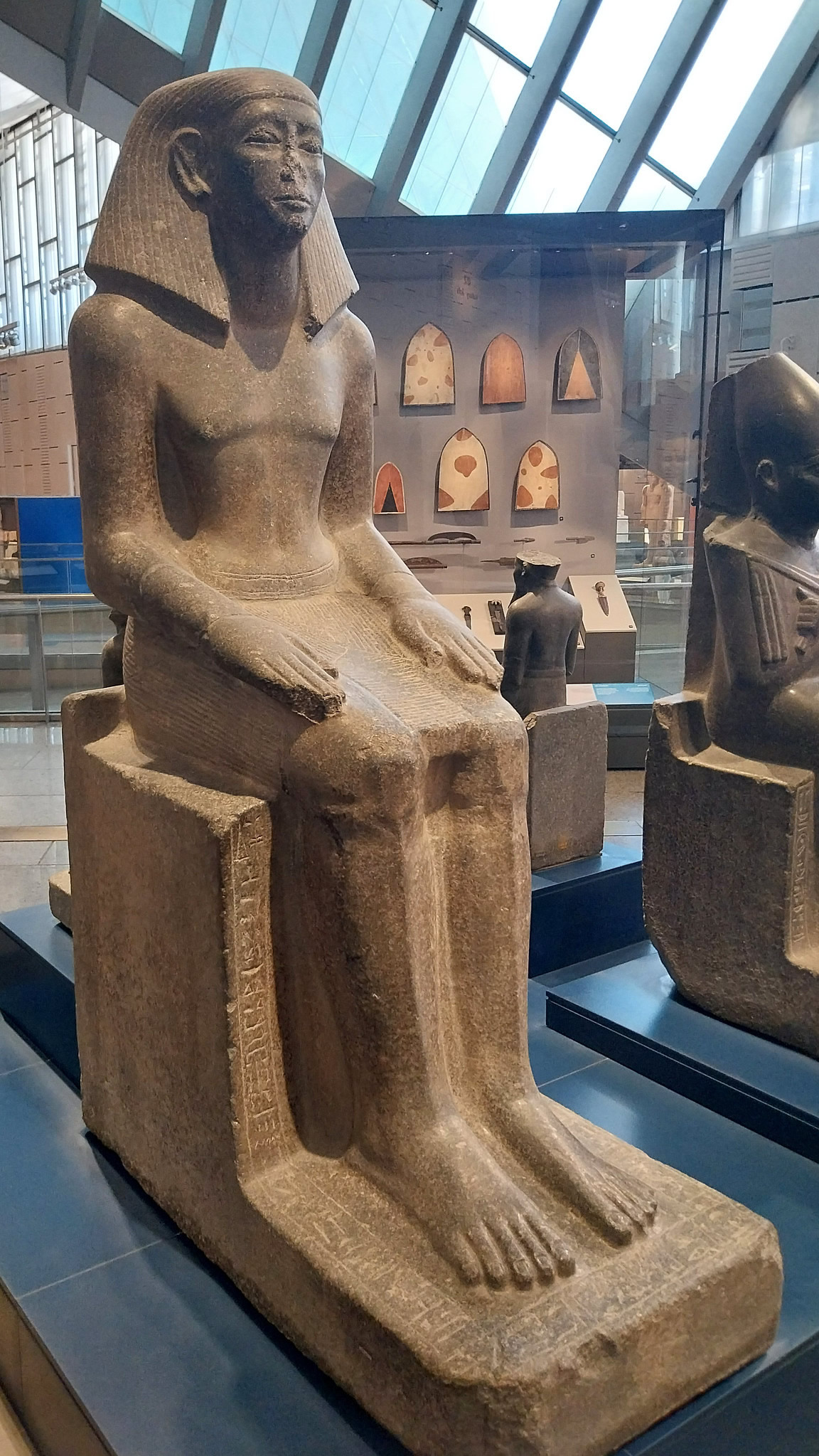
Statue of the god's father Mentuhotep

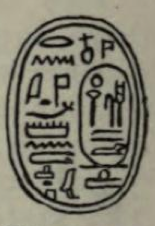
Scarab of king Sobekhotep III also mentioning his father Mentuhotep

Mentuhotep was the non-royal father of the ancient Egyptian king Sobekhotep III, who ruled for about three years in the Thirteenth Dynasty, around 1750 BC.

== Attestations ==
Mentuhotep is mainly known from monuments of his son while he was king. On these monuments appears also his wife Iuhetibu, who was called king's mother. On the monuments relating to Sobekhotep III, Mentuhotep bears the title god's father. The latter title is often given to non-royal fathers of kings. It is not known under which circumstances Sobekhotep III became king. However, his father Mentuhotep had no known royal connections. Two further sons are known, Seneb and Khakau. They bore the title king's son, albeit being evidently not the son of a king, but brothers of one.

A high number of scarab seals is known of a military official Mentuhotep with the title commander of the ruler's crew. This official had a son with the same title named Sobekhotep. It seems possible that these scarabs belong to the god's father Mentuhotep before his son became king.
