= Iuhetibu Fendy =

- King's Daughter
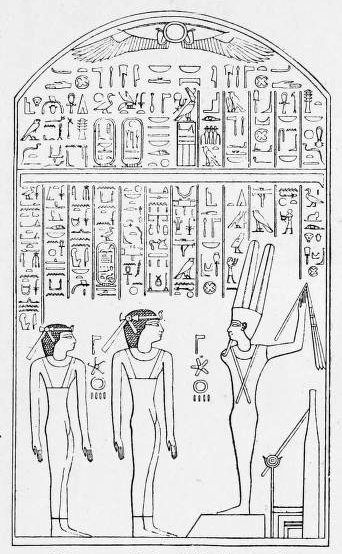
- Iuhetibu Fendy and her sister Dedetanqet. Louvre, stele C8
Egyptian name
< E9 H t N35B ib Z2 >
Nickname:f n d D19
- Dynasty: Thirteenth Dynasty
- Father: Sobekhotep III
- Mother: Neni

Iuhetibu Fendy (also written Jewhetibew Fendy) (Ancient Egyptian: Iwḥ.t-ibw Fnd) was an ancient Egyptian princess of the Thirteenth Dynasty. She may have been the heiress of King Sobekhotep III, as her name was written in cartouche.

== Family ==
King's Daughter Iuhetibu Fendy (sꜣt-nsw jwḥt-jb/fnḏ(t)) was the daughter of King Sobekhotep III and King's Wife Neni. Apparently, she was named after her paternal grandmother King's Mother Iuhetibu. Her sister was King's Daughter Dedetankhet/Dedetanqet. It is unknown if Iuhetibu Fendy ever married. Her title may indicate she was still young.

== Attestations ==
Iuhetibu Fendy is known from two sources.

1. She appears on a rock-cut stela in the Wadi el-Hol.
2. Paris, Louvre C8 | At Abydos, she appears on a stela together with her sister Dedetanqet (also written Dedetanuq) in front of the fertility god Min. Her two names are written within a cartouche (a ring that enclosures the name), a privilege that was given in this time very rarely to royal women and points to a special status of Iuhetibu Fendy. Iuhetibu Fendy bears a double name. The first name Iuhetibu was also the name of Iuhetibu Fendy's grandmother. Naming children after grandparents was not uncommon in Ancient Egypt. Fendy is a nickname meaning "nose".
