= Sihathor =

Egyptian pharaoh & ruler of the 13th Dynasty of Egypt

- Sahathor, Menuazra
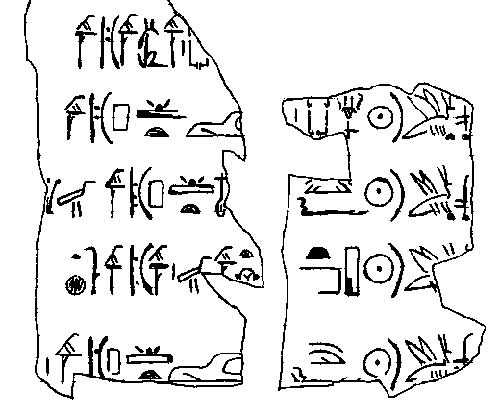
- Sihathor's name on the Turin canon (second row from bottom)

Pharaoh
- Reign: less than a year, "[...] months and 3 days" as a coregent with Neferhotep I
- Coregency: Neferhotep I
- Predecessor: Neferhotep I
- Successor: Sobekhotep IV
Royal titulary
Prenomen
Ra Sihathor
(Rˁ)-s3-Ḥtḥr
Ra, the son of Hathor
M23 t L2 t < ra Hwt t pr G5 G7 G38 Z1 G7 >
Nomen
Menwadjre
Mn-w3ḏ-Rˁ
Ra, he whose prosperity is lasting
G39 N5 < N5 mn wAD >
- Father: Haankhef
- Mother: Kemi
- Burial: likely intended to be in Abydos close to those of his brothers
- Dynasty: 13th dynasty

Menwadjre Sihathor was an ephemeral ruler of the late 13th Dynasty during the Middle Kingdom. Sihathor may never have enjoyed an independent reign, possibly only ruling for a few months as a coregent with his brother Neferhotep I.

According to Egyptologist Kim Ryholt, Sihathor died in 1733 BC while Detlef Franke dates his short reign to 1694 BC. His tomb is likely to be the unfinished one located between the tombs of his brothers S9 and S10, in Abydos.

== Attestations ==
According to the latest reading of the Turin canon by Ryholt, Sihathor is recorded there on column 7, line 26 (Gardiner col. 6, line 26). Sihathor is attested on two statues from the Hekaib sanctuary in Elephantine as a "king's son", which is here an honorary title referring to his brother Neferhotep I being king. Two rock inscriptions from Philae and Sehel Island further mention Sihathor as a brother to Neferhotep I. According to Ryholt and Stephen Quirke, Sihathor is also attested as a king on a steatite cylinder seal, now in the Petrie Museum (UC1157), and a bead of unknown provenance, now in the Brooklyn Museum. A few further seals mentioning a king's son Sihathor are known, but Ryholt concludes that they may correspond to another Sihathor. Finally, Vivian Davies points to the existence of a statue of Sihathor made after his death and where he is only given the title of "king's son".

== Family ==
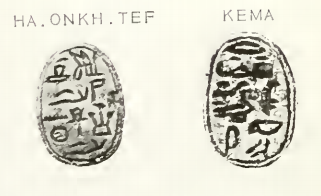
Scarab seals of the "Royal seal bearer, divine father Haankhef", the father of Sihathor, and "Princess, royal daughter Kema", daughter of Neferhotep, niece of Sihathor.

The family of Sihathor is known thanks to the rock inscriptions of Philae and Sehel made by his brother Neferhotep I. Sihathor's father is thus known to be Haankhef, his mother was Kemi and his brothers were Neferhotep I and Sobekhotep IV, the later of whom eventually succeeded him on the throne.

== Tomb ==
The Egyptologist and archaeologist Josef W. Wegner of the University of Pennsylvania has led excavations of the tomb and funerary complex of Senusret III in Abydos as well as of the surrounding necropolis. This necropolis was found to comprise royal tombs dating to the Second Intermediate Period as well as from the earlier late Middle Kingdom. Two large tombs in particular, S9 and S10 are now believed to belong to Sihathor's pharaoh brothers, Neferhotep I and Sobekhotep IV. Indeed, evidences gathered from the neighbouring tombs reveal that a king Sobekhotep was buried in S10, who must be Sobekhotep IV given the size of the tomb, its general datation and location in Abydos. By extension, S9 is likely to belong to Neferhotep I.

These attributions are crucial for locating Sihathor's tomb, as indeed Wegner has found an unfinished royal burial at the immediate north-east of S10, east of S9. According to him, its position suggest very strongly that it was intended for Neferhotep's chosen heir Sihathor. The burial seems to have been abandoned at the death of its intended owner, its massive granite sarcophagus reused at a later time, during the chaotic Second Intermediate Period.

Preceded by Neferhotep I	Pharaoh of Egypt; Thirteenth Dynasty	Succeeded by Sobekhotep IV
