= Wahneferhotep =

Ancient Egyptian prince

Wahneferhotep was an ancient Egyptian king's son who lived in the Thirteenth Dynasty, around 1700 BC.

== Attestation ==
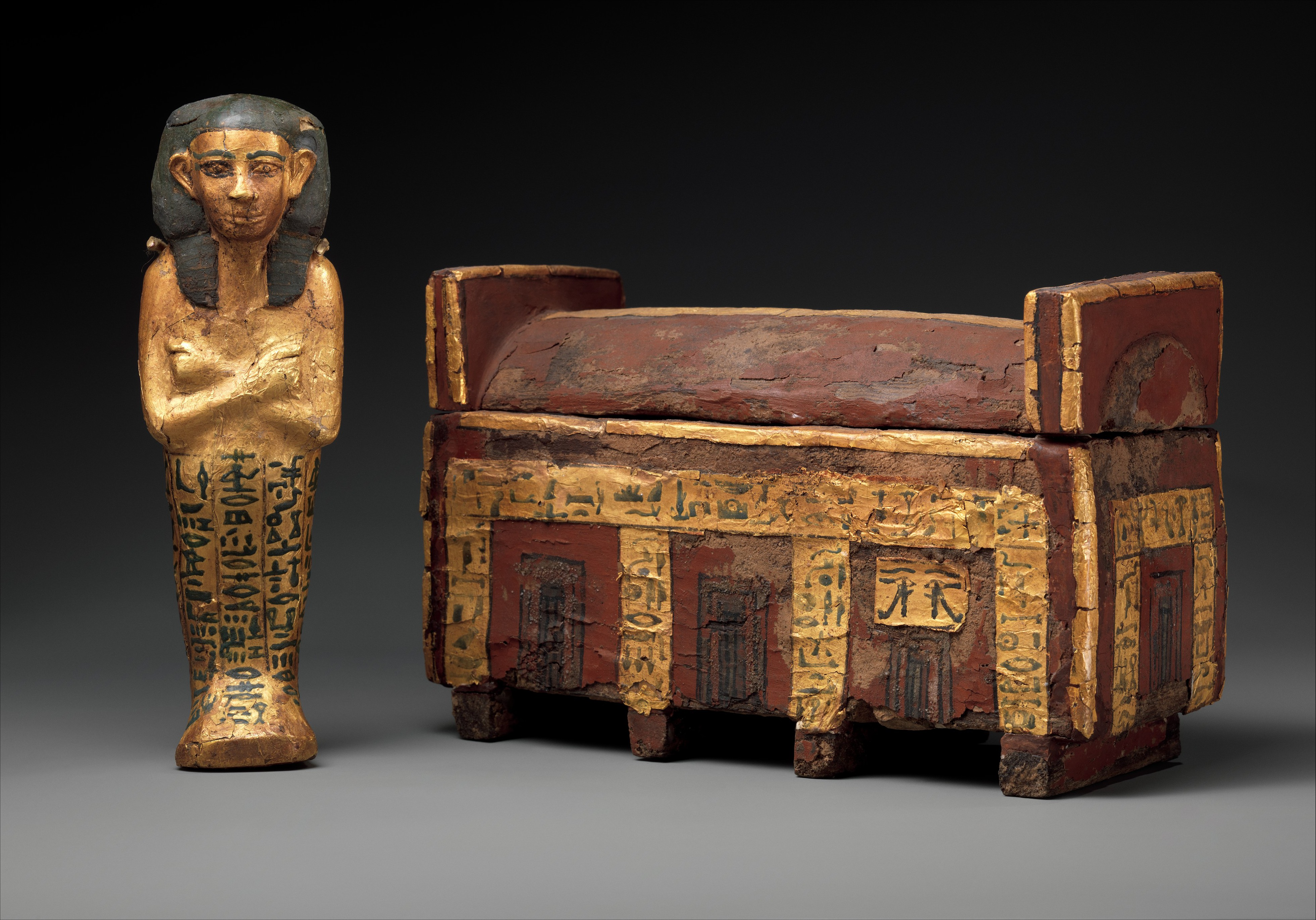
Model coffin and shabti of Wahneferhotep, Metropolitan Museum of Art.

Wahneferhotep is only known from a shabti and model coffin found in the mortuary temple of the pyramid of Senusret I at Lisht, and now at the Metropolitan Museum of Art. On both objects he bears the title king's son. His name means Neferhotep endures.

== Theories ==
Neferhotep might refer to king Neferhotep I, who was one of the most powerful rulers of the Thirteenth Dynasty; some scholars argue that this king is the most likely ruler that is mentioned in the name. However, the pottery found near the model coffins points to a later date, making it more likely that Neferhotep refers to another, later, king with the same name.
