= Tjan (queen) =

Ancient Egyptian queen consort

G47 n
Tjan
in hieroglyphs
Era: 2nd Intermediate Period
(1650–1550 BC)

Tjan was the wife of the ancient Egyptian king Sobekhotep IV of the 13th Dynasty, during the late 18th century BC.

Tjan bears the title King's wife and is known from only several objects. In the British Museum there is a bead with the short inscription: king's wife, Tjan, beloved of Hathor, mistress of Atfih. In the Louvre, there is a scarab with her name and title. In the Egyptian Museum of Cairo there is a box with an inscription stating that a certain [...]hotep begotten of king Khaneferre and born of the king's wife Tjan. The name of the son is only partly preserved. Khaneferre is the throne name of king Sobekhotep IV. This inscription identifies her as the wife of this king. Finally there is a fragment of a faience vase naming her daughter Nebetiunet. Tjan does not appear on monuments of the king. Perhaps she married him late in his reign.
