= Haankhef =

Father of three Egyptian pharaohs

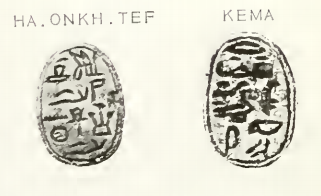
Scarab seals of the "Royal sealer, god's father Haankhef" and the "member of the elite, king's daughter Kema".

Haankhef was the father of the ancient Egyptian kings Neferhotep I, Sihathor, and Sobekhotep IV, who successively ruled Egypt during the second half of the 18th century BC as kings of the 13th Dynasty.

== Biography ==
Haankhef is known from a number of monuments all of which are connected to his royal sons. On his monuments Haankhef bears the titles "Royal Sealer" and "God's Father". Both titles were given to him after his sons became kings and it is consequently unknown what position he held before these events. "God's father" is a title often given to the non-royal parents of a king and Haankhef's father Nehy is indeed known to have been a simple "officer of the town regiment" in Thebes. Similarly Haankhef's mother Senebtysy only held the common title of "Lady of the House". This indicates that Haankhef belonged to a rather middle level family of military officials. What role this background played in the accession of Neferhotep I to the throne is unknown. Haankhef is one of only two fathers of a pharaoh to be mentioned on the Turin canon, a king list redacted during the early Ramesside era. The reason for this rare privilege is uncertain, it may be connected to his two royal sons who were later considered as the greatest kings of the 13th Dynasty in an otherwise shaky period for Egypt.

== Family ==
The wife of Haankhef is known to have been named Kemi thanks to several sources, in particular rock inscriptions made by Neferhotep I on Sehel Island, Konosso and Philae. In these inscriptions, Kemi is often named together with Haankhef although there are also a number of scaraboid seals naming her and her son without any mention of Haankhef. A stela of Neferhotep I from Abydos indicates that she was already dead by the second regnal year of her eldest son. Haankhef grandson by Neferhotep I was also named Haankhef, possibly in his honour.

Nehy	Senebtisi
Haankhef	Kemi
Neferhotep I	Sihathor	Sobekhotep IV

== Attestations ==
Haankhef (PD 410) is known from several items.

Block Rio de Janeiro 637/638 [2428] provides the name of his parents. At Elephantine, a statue Aswan 1347 belonging to King's Son Sihathor (brother of King Neferhotep I) refers to the King's Mother Kemi and God's Father Haaankhef.
