= Seneb (king's son) =

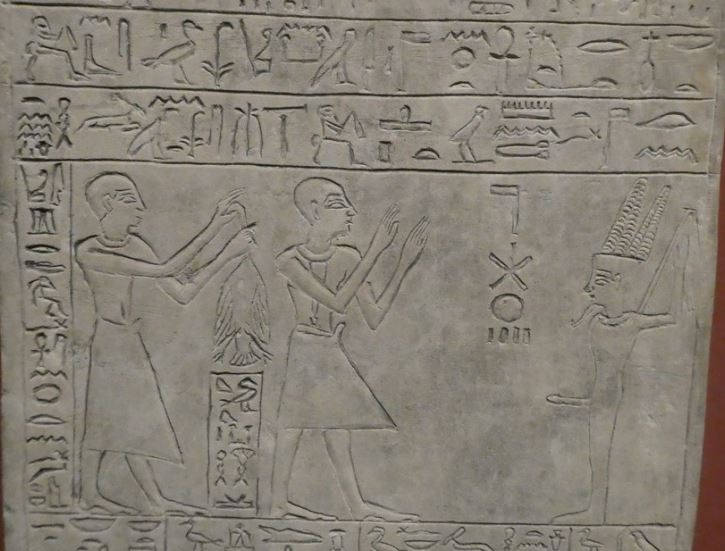
Stela Vienna, Kunsthistorisches Museum, showing Seneb in front of the god Min

Seneb was an ancient Egyptian living in the Thirteenth Dynasty about 1750 BC. He is known from a number of sources around king Sobekhotep III, who was his brother. The father of Seneb was the god's father Mentuhotep, his mother was the king's mother called Iuhetibu. Seneb bears the title king's son, although he was not the son of a king. In the Thirteenth Dynasty the title king's son was often used as title of honor and did not automatically mean that the title bearer was the son of a king. Seneb's own family is known from a stela now in Vienna (ÄS 135). His wife was called Nebtit and their children were:

- Elder of the hall Sobekhotep.
- Lady of the house Iuhetibu (named for her paternal grandmother)
- Trainer of the dogs Mentuhotep (named for her paternal grandfather)
- Henut.
