= Senebi =

Egyptian treasurer

- Treasurer
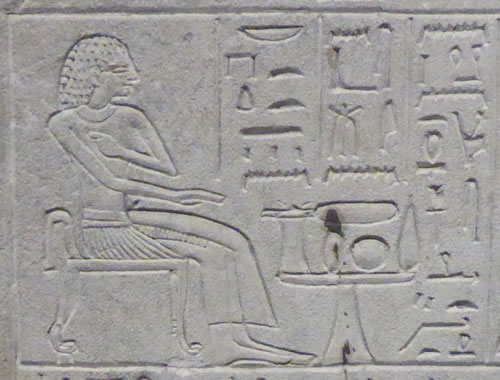
- Senebi, depicted on stela
Egyptian name
s n b i
- Dynasty: 13th dynasty
- Pharaoh: Neferhotep I, Sobekhotep IV
- Spouse: ?
- Father: Nebpu (soldier of the town regiment)
- Mother: Tjeni (lady of the house)
- Children: ?

Senebi (or Senbi) was an ancient Egyptian treasurer under the late 13th Dynasty kings Neferhotep I and Sobekhotep IV (around 1750 BC). Senebi belongs to the best attested officials of the 13th Dynasty.

== Family ==
Parents. Senebi's father was the soldier of the town regiment Nebpu. His mother was Lady of the House Tjeni.

Wife and Children. We know nothing about his wife or children from his monuments.

== Career ==
=== King's acquaintance ===
We learn about Senebi's from a relatively advanced stage of his career, functioning as a king's acquaintance. The title king's acquaintance (rḫ-nswt)) indicate his high rank and function in the court hierarchy, and people with this title are often subordinates to the treasurer. It shows his status and that he had a prominent family background belonging to the Egyptian elite.

=== Treasurer ===
Under king Neferhotep I he was appointed treasurer (overseer of sealed things). The treasurer was one of the most powerful officials at the royal court. As treasurer he was assisted by king's acquaintance Nebankh and king's acquaintance Rehuankh. He appears in a rock inscription on Sehel Island, south of Aswan. In this inscription he is mentioned next to the family of King Neferhotep I.

=== Treasurer and governor ===
In the early stage as treasurer, his title string was sealbearer of the bjti-king (ḫtmw-bjtj), sole friend (smr-wꜥtj), and treasurer (jmj-rꜣ ḫtmt). In a later stage as treasurer, his title string was expanded to include member of the pat. (jrj-pꜥt) and governor (ḥꜣtj-ꜥ). Monuments with the full title string "jrj-pꜥt; ḥꜣtj-ꜥ; ḫtmw-bjtj; smr-wꜥtj; jmj-rꜣ ḫtmt snbj" apparently can be dated to the last part of his life, like Stela BM EA 428 and Stela Cairo CG 20614.

=== Ranking titles ===
Senebi is known from several stelae and scarab seals, where he also bears the important ranking titles royal sealer and sole friend.

The time of his death and his burial place are unknown.

== Attestation ==
He is attested by several monuments.

=== Cairo CG 20614 ===
At Abydos (north necropolis), a round-topped stela mentions his family. The stela may belong to "Memphis-Faiyum Workshop 3" along with other monuments from the same workshop. Senebi carries his full title string. Also mentioned are his assistants the King's Acquaintance Senen and King's Acquaintance Rehuankh.

=== Stela Liverpool M13661 ===
A limestone round-topped stele of Senebi. It was destroyed during WWII.

=== Stela Liverpool M13665 ===
A limestone round-topped stele of Senebi. It was destroyed during WWII.

== Literature ==
- Wolfram Grajetzki: Court Officials of the Egyptian Middle Kingdom, London 2009 p. 64, pl. 2 ISBN 978-0-7156-3745-6
