= Neferhotep I =

Egyptian pharaoh

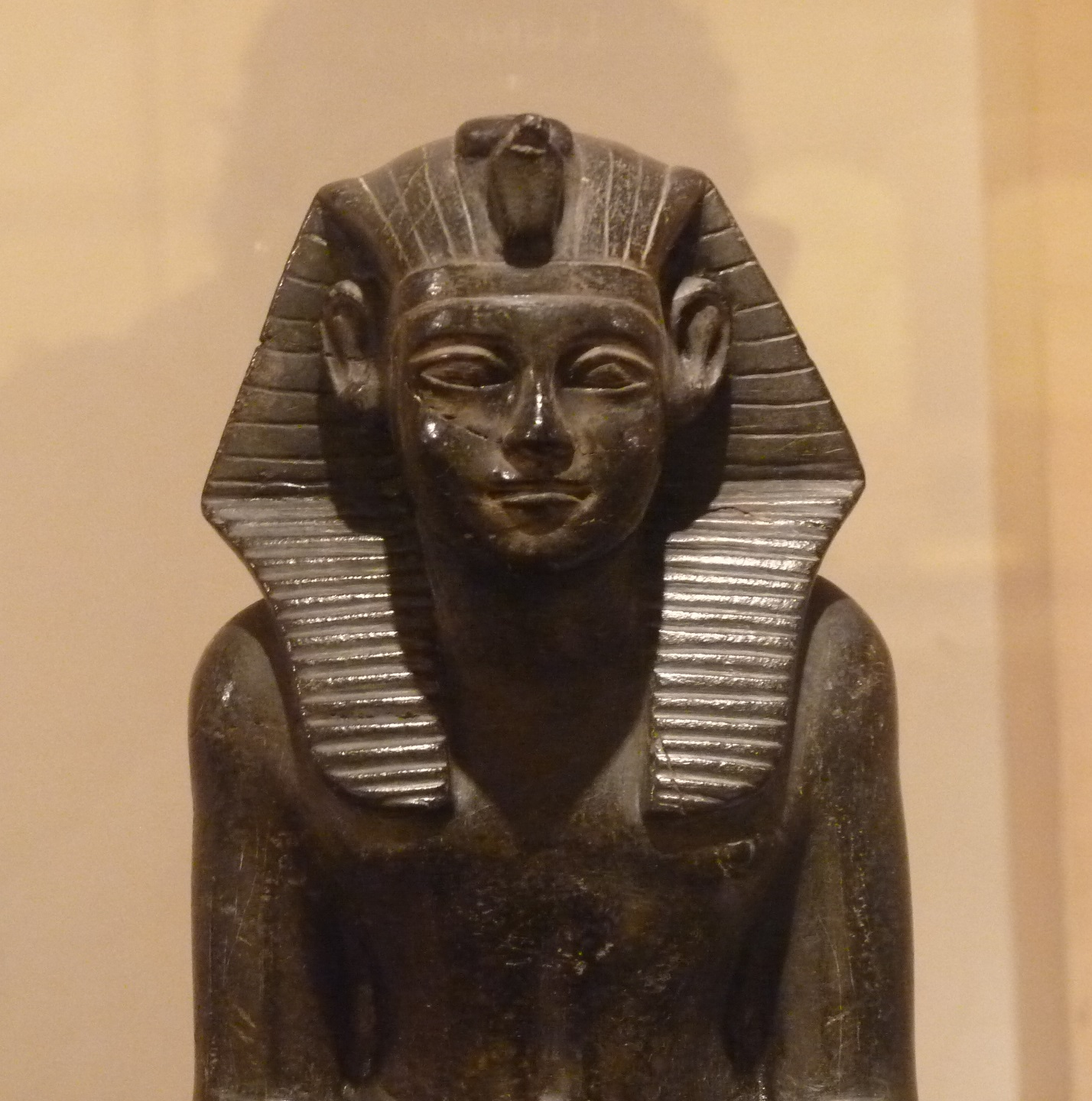
- Statue of Neferhotep I from the Faiyum, Archaeological Museum of Bologna

Pharaoh
- Reign: 11 years and 1–4 months, 1747–1736 BC, 1742–1733 BC, 1741–1730 BC, c. 1740 BC, 1740–1729 BC, 1721–1710 BC, 1705–1694 BC
- Coregency: Sihathor, then Sobekhotep IV
- Predecessor: Sobekhotep III
- Successor: Sihathor as coregent, then Sobekhotep IV
Royal titulary
Horus name
Geregtawy
Grg-t3.wj
Founder of the two lands
G5	grg N19
Nebty name
Wepmaat
Wp-m3ˁ.t
He who accomplishes the Maat
G16	wp p Z9 U5 a t mDAt Sw
Golden Horus
Menmerut
Mn-mrwt
Stable of love
G8 mn n U7 r w t
Prenomen
Khasekhemre
Ḫˁ-sḫm-Rˁ
The might of Ra appears< ra N28 D36 sxm >
Turin canon
Kha[...]re Neferhotep
Ḫˁ-Rˁ-...-nfr-htp
[...] of Ra appears, he who is beautiful and peaceful
< N5 xa a HASH nfr R4 t p > G7
Karnak king list
Khasekhemre
Ḫˁ-sḫm-Rˁ
The might of Ra appears
< ra xa Y8 >
Nomen
Neferhotep
Nfr-ḥtp
Beautiful and peaceful

G39 N5	nfr Htp t p
- Consort: Senebsen
- Children: Haankhef, Kemi, Wahneferhotep
- Father: Haankhef
- Mother: Kemi
- Burial: Possibly tomb S9 in Abydos, see text
- Dynasty: 13th Dynasty

Khasekhemre Neferhotep I was an Egyptian pharaoh of the mid Thirteenth Dynasty ruling in the second half of the 18th century BC during a time referred to as the late Middle Kingdom or early Second Intermediate Period, depending on the scholar. One of the best attested rulers of the 13th Dynasty, Neferhotep I reigned for 11 years according to the Turin King List.

The grandson of a non-royal townsman from a Theban family with a military background, Neferhotep I's relation to his predecessor Sobekhotep III is unclear and he may have usurped the throne. Neferhotep I was likely contemporaneous with kings Zimri-Lim of Mari and Hammurabi of Babylon. Little is known of his activities during his decade-long reign and the most important document surviving from his rule is a stela from Abydos recounting the fashioning of an image of Osiris and Neferhotep's determination that it be made "as instructed by the gods at the beginning of time".

Towards the end of his reign, Neferhotep I shared the throne with his brother Sihathor, a coregency that lasted a few months to a year. Sihathor died shortly before Neferhotep, who probably then appointed another brother, Sobekhotep IV, as coregent. In any case, Sobekhotep IV succeeded Neferhotep I soon afterwards, and reigned over Egypt for almost a decade. The reigns of the two brothers mark the apex of the 13th Dynasty.

== Family ==
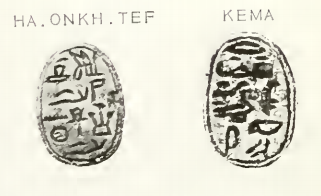
Scarab seals of the "Royal sealer, god's father Haankhef", father of Neferhotep I and the "member of the elite, king's daughter Kema", daughter of Neferhotep I

=== Origins ===
Neferhotep I seems to have come from a non-royal family of Thebes with a military background. His grandfather, Nehy, held the title "officer of a town regiment". Nehy was married to a woman called Senebtysy. Nothing is known about her other than that she held the common title "lady of the house". Their only known son was called Haankhef.

Haankhef always appears in the sources as "God's father" and "royal sealer" and his wife Kemi as "king's mother" indicating that neither of them was of royal birth. The parentage of Neferhotep and Haankhef is directly confirmed by a number of scarab seals from El-Lahun where the latter is said to be the father of the former. Haankhef is also explicitly recorded as the father of Neferhotep I in the Turin canon, a king list compiled during the early Ramesside era and which serves as the primary historical source for the rulers of this time period. This is an extremely rare occurrence as the Turin canon normally only names the pharaohs, while non-royal people are excluded from the list. Beyond Haankhef, the only other exception to this rule is the father of Sobekhotep II.

Egyptologists have noted that instead of hiding their non-royal origins, Neferhotep I, his predecessor Sobekhotep III, and his successor Sobekhotep IV, remarkably, proclaimed them on their stelae and scarab seals. This is at odds with the traditional Egyptian system where the legitimacy of the new king rests mainly on his filiation. These proclamations of non-royal origins were possibly made to dissociate these kings from their immediate predecessors, in particular Seth Meribre whose monuments have been usurped and defaced. The reason for this remains unknown.

=== Descendants and succession ===
Inscriptions from Aswan indicate that Neferhotep I had at least two children, named Haankhef and Kemi like his parents, with a woman called Senebsen. He also possibly had another son named Wahneferhotep. In spite of this, Neferhotep I named his brother Sihathor as coregent in the last months of his reign and when both Sihathor and Neferhotep I died around the same time, they were succeeded by another brother, Sobekhotep IV.

Sobekhotep IV, whose reign marks the apex of the 13th Dynasty, mentions on a stela (Cairo JE 51911) that was placed in the temple of Amun at Karnak that he was born in Thebes:

My majesty [came] to the Southern City since I wanted to see the august god; it is my city in which I was born. ... I saw the vigor of his majesty (i.e. Amun) at every single feast when I was a child who could not yet conceive.

Similarly, Neferhotep I could well have been born in Thebes; even though the capital of Egypt during the 13th Dynasty was still Itjtawy in the north, near the modern village of el-Lisht.

== Reign ==
=== Attestations ===
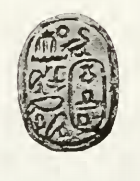
Scarab reading "Son of Re, Neferhotep, born of the Royal Mother, Kemi"

Artefacts

Neferhotep I is known from a relatively high number of objects found over a large area, from Byblos to the north to the Egyptian fortresses of Buhen and Mirgissa in Lower Nubia to the south through all parts of Egypt, especially in the southern portion of Upper Egypt. A single attestation is known from Lower Egypt, a scarab from Tell el-Yahudiya. Other attestations include over 60 scarab seals, 2 cylinder-seals, a statue from Elephantine, and 11 rock inscriptions from Wadi el Shatt el-Rigal, Sehel Island, Konosso and Philae. The inscriptions record the members of Neferhotep's family as well as two high officials serving him "The royal acquaintance Nebankh" and the "Treasurer Senebi". Two stelae are known from Abydos one of which, usurped from king Wegaf and dated to his fourth regnal year, forbids the construction of tombs on the sacred processional way of Wepwawet. Two naoses housing two statues each of Neferhotep, as well as a pedestal bearing Neferhotep's and Sobekhotep IV's cartouches, have been found in Karnak. There are also a few attestations from the Faiyum region where the capital of Egypt was located at the time, in particular a statuette of the king dedicated to Sobek and Horus of Shedet, now on display in the Archaeological Museum of Bologna.

King lists

Beyond these contemporary attestations, Neferhotep is listed on the 34th entry of the Karnak king list as well as the 7th column, 25th row of the Turin canon. The Turin king list credits Neferhotep with a reign of 11 years and 1 to 4 months, the second or third longest of the dynasty after Merneferre Ay (23 years) and Sobekhotep IV (9–12 years).

=== Chronology ===
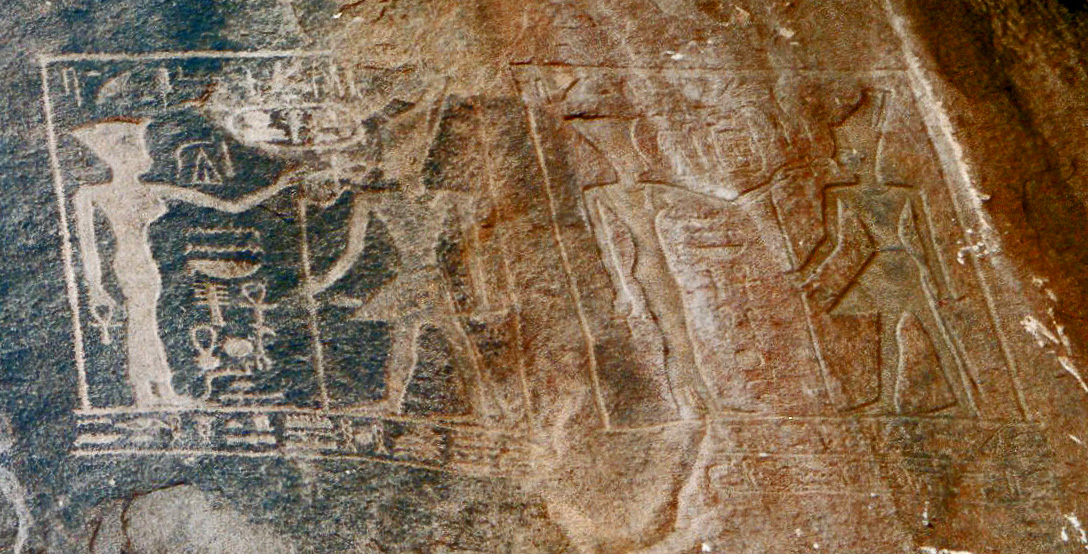
Inscription on Sehel island showing Anukis giving the life sign to Neferhotep I

Neferhotep I's relative chronological position is secured thanks to the Turin canon as well as contemporary attestations. He was the successor of Sobekhotep III and predecessor of Sobekhotep IV. Since his father Haankhef and mother Kemi are also well attested and not known to have had any title beyond those of "God's father" and "King's mother", respectively, Egyptologists such as Kim Ryholt and Darrell Baker believe that Neferhotep I was of non-royal birth and usurped the throne. The military background of his family might have played a role in this.

On the other hand, the absolute chronological position of Neferhotep is debated, with Ryholt and Baker seeing him respectively as the 26th and 27th pharaoh of the 13th Dynasty while Detlef Franke and Jürgen von Beckerath contend that he was only the 22nd ruler. Similarly, the absolute dating of Neferhotep's reign varies by as much as 40 years between the scholars, with Kim Ryholt dating the beginning of his reign c. 1740 BC and Thomas Schneider c. 1700 BC.

=== Extent of rule ===
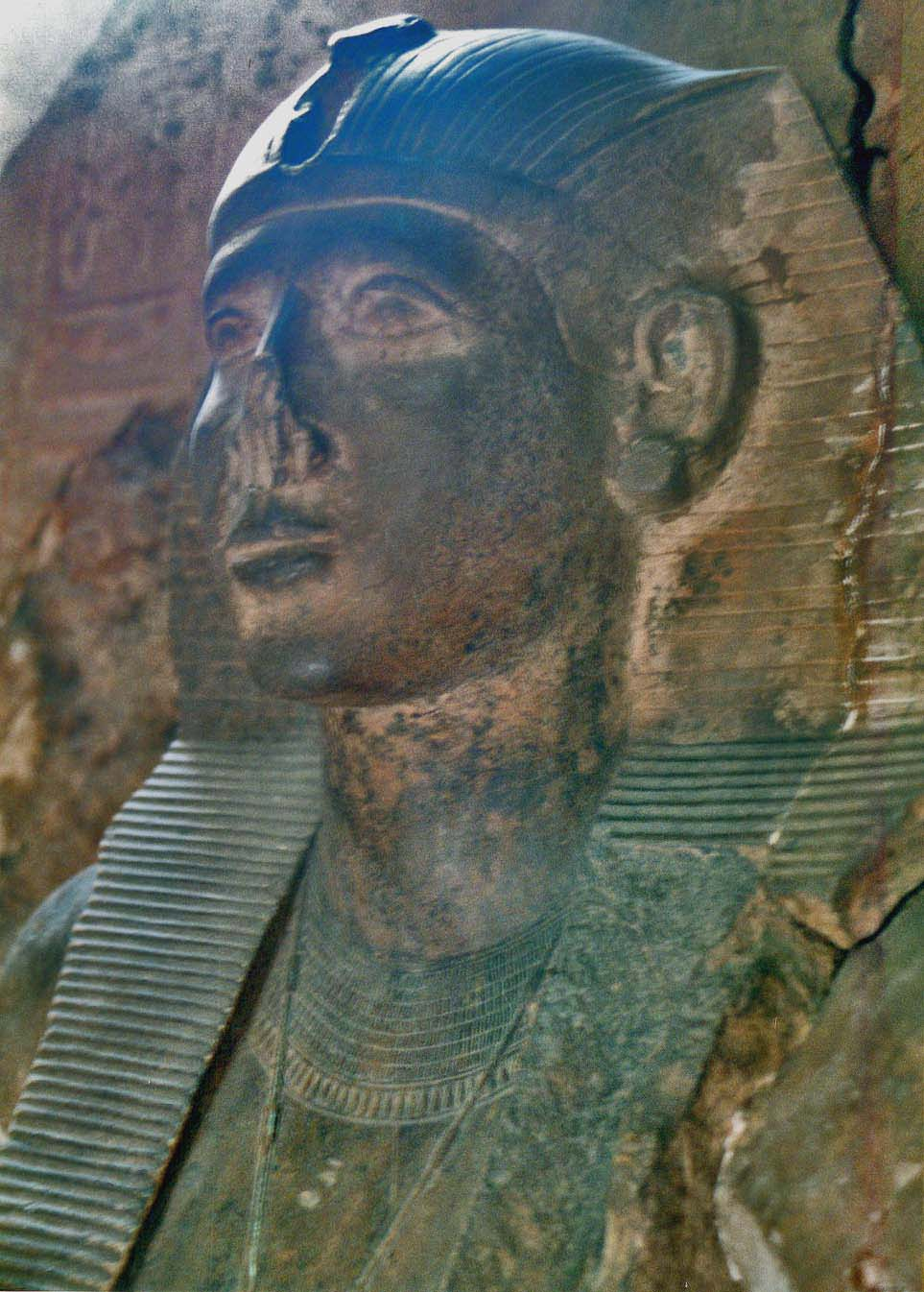
Statue of Neferhotep I from his first naos found in Karnak, now in the Egyptian Museum

Whether Neferhotep I usurped the throne at the expense of Sobekhotep III or inherited it, it's possible he acceded to power over a fragmented Egypt. The Egyptologist Kim Ryholt believes that the Canaanite 14th Dynasty was already in existence at the time, forming an independent realm controlling at least the Eastern Nile Delta. This could explain why Neferhotep's only attestation in Lower Egypt is a single scarab seal. While this analysis is accepted by some scholars, among whom are Gae Callender, Janine Bourriau and Darrell Baker, it is rejected by others, including Manfred Bietak, Daphna Ben-Tor and James and Susan Allen, who contend that Neferhotep I reigned over the whole of Egypt. Examples of evidence for this point of view are the several attestations of Neferhotep found northeast of Egypt, in the Levant, in particular the stela of the Governor of Byblos Yantinu and four scarab seals from Canaan, indicating that he retained enough power to maintain trade relations with this region.

Alternatively, recent excavations have yielded seals of Neferhotep's brother Sobekhotep IV in proximity with seals of the powerful Hyksos king Khyan of the 15th Dynasty (c.1650–1550 BC) in a closed archaeological context, possibly indicating that the two were contemporary. If this is so, Neferhotep I would have been contemporary with either Khyan or one of his predecessors, such as Sakir-Har, and would not have reigned over the Nile Delta. This conclusion is strongly debated at the moment since Sobekhotep IV and Khyan are separated by c. 100 years in the conventional Egyptian chronology.

=== Activities ===
In spite of the numerous attestations known for Neferhotep I, relatively little is known of the activities he undertook during his decade-long reign. The pedestal of Neferhotep I and Sobekhotep IV as well as the naos of Neferhotep discovered by Georges Legrain in Karnak indicate that he undertook some building works there. This is further confirmed by the 2005 discovery in Karnak of a second naos housing a 1.80 m (5.9 ft) tall double statue of Neferhotep holding hands with himself. The naos was located beneath the foundations of the northern obelisk of Hatshepsut.

The most important monument of the king surviving to this day is a large, heavily eroded stela dating to his second regnal year and found in Abydos. The inscription on the stela is one of the few ancient Egyptian royal texts to record how a king might conceive of and order the making of a sculpture. As usual, the stela begins with Neferhotep's titulary:

The Majesty of the Horus: Founder of the Two Lands, He of the Two Ladies: Revealing the Truth, Falcon of Gold: Lasting of Love, King of Upper and Lower Egypt Khasekhemre, Son of Ra Neferhotep, born to the king's mother Kemi, granted life, stability, and dominion like Ra forever.

It then describes how Neferhotep, residing in his palace "Exalted of Beauty" likely located in Itjtawy, desires that an image of Osiris be made in order for it to participate in the yearly festival held in the god's honour in Abydos in Upper Egypt. To this end, Neferhotep first enquires to his officials about instructions regarding the making of divine images said to be contained in "the primeval writings of Atum". His officials then bring him to a temple library where the writings are located and he orders a messenger, the "Custodian of the Royal Property", to be sent to the Abydos festival. Meanwhile, or possibly before sending the messenger, the statue of Osiris is made of silver, gold and copper, the work being carried out under the supervision of the king. Finally, the king himself goes to Abydos to celebrate the festival of Osiris.

More generally, Neferhotep's time on the throne was likely prosperous as there are many private monuments datable to his reign and that of his brother, and especially in sculpture some remarkably high quality art works were produced.

=== Tomb ===
As of 2017, the tomb of Neferhotep I has not been formally identified, although a strong case now exists for it to be in Abydos. Since 2013 a team of archaeologists from the University of Pennsylvania under the direction of Josef W. Wegner has been excavating a Late Middle Kingdom—Second Intermediate Period royal necropolis in Abydos, at the foot of a natural hill known to the ancient Egyptians as the Mountain of Anubis. The necropolis is located just next to the massive funerary complex of Senusret III of the 12th Dynasty and comprises two further large tombs, likely to have been pyramids built during the mid-13th Dynasty, as well as no less than eight royal tombs, possibly dating to the Abydos Dynasty. One of the large tombs, which was extensively plundered of goods and stones during the Second Intermediate Period, known today as tomb S10, is now believed to belong to king Sobekhotep IV, Neferhotep's brother, on the basis of several finds showing Sobkehotep's name from the nearby royal tombs, such as that of Woseribre Senebkay. As a corollary, Wegner has suggested that the anonymous, large, neighboring tomb S9 could have belonged to Neferhotep I. Egyptologists have also noted that both kings were very active in the Abydos region during their reigns.

Older hypotheses concerning the location of Neferhotep's tomb included that proposed by Nicolas Grimal, that Neferhotep was buried in a pyramid at el-Lisht, close to that of Senusret I, an opinion shared by Michael Rice. This remains conjectural, as no artefact permitting the identification of Neferhotep as the owner of such a pyramid has been found. Grimal's hypothesis relies only on indirect evidence: the presence of scarabs of Neferhotep in Lisht as well as the discovery of a shawabti of a prince Wahneferhotep "(King) Neferhotep endures" close to the northern gateway of the mortuary temple of the pyramid complex of Senusret I. The shawabti was wrapped in linen and placed in a miniature coffin, which is dated to the 13th Dynasty on stylistic grounds. This together with the name of Wahneferhotep and his title of "King's son" indicate that Wahneferhotep was likely a son of Neferhotep I, who may have been buried in the vicinity of his father's pyramid.

Alternatively, Dawn Landua-McCormack suggested that the Southern South Saqqara pyramid could have been a candidate for Neferhotep's burial site. This pyramid, datable to the middle 13th Dynasty, was provided with two elaborate sarcophagus chambers which might have been destined for two wealthy brother kings of the dynasty such as Neferhotep I and Sobekhotep IV.

== Coregencies ==
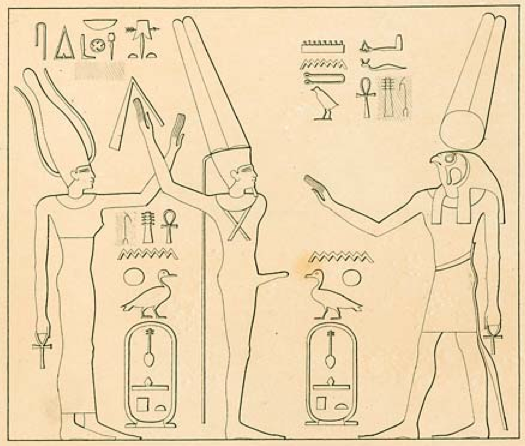
Drawing by Karl Richard Lepsius of a rock inscription from Konosso showing Montu, Min and Satet with the cartouches of Neferhotep I

The circumstances of Neferhotep's death after a reign of eleven years are unknown. His successor was his brother, Sobekhotep IV, who is perhaps the most important ruler of the 13th Dynasty. Another brother, Sihathor, appears in the Turin canon as successor, but it seems that he only reigned for a few months as coregent with Neferhotep I and never became an independent ruler, likely because he predeceased his elder brother. After this, it is possible that Neferhotep I designated his younger brother Sobekhotep IV as coregent. There are two inscriptions from Sehel showing Neferhotep I, Sihathor and Sobekhotep IV, which could mean that they reigned for some time together, although Sihathor is declared dead on both lists. Another piece of evidence is an inscription from the Wadi Hammamat showing the cartouches of Neferhotep I and Sobekhotep IV on par, next to each other. Some Egyptologists see this as evidence of a coregency between these two kings, while others, including Ryholt, reject this interpretation and believe the inscription was made by Sobekhotep to honour his deceased brother.

== Historical synchronism ==
A stela bearing Neferhotep I's name is of great importance to archaeologists and historians alike as it enables a concordance between the Egyptian and Near Eastern chronologies. This stela depicts the "Governor of Byblos, Yantinu ... who was begotten by Governor Yakin" seated upon a throne, in front of which are the nomen and prenomen of Neferhotep I. This is significant for two reasons: first, Yakin is plausibly identifiable with a Yakin-Ilu of Byblos known from a cylinder seal of Sehetepibre, indicating that this king and Neferhotep are separated by a generation. Second, a "King of Byblos Yantin-'Ammu" is known from the archives of Mari who is most likely the same person as the Governor of Byblos Yantinu of the stela. Indeed, Byblos was a semi-autonomous Egyptian governorate at the time and "the king of Byblos" must be the Semitic king of the city ruling it in the name of the pharaoh. The archives of Mari predominantly date to the reign of the last king of the city, Zimri-Lim, a contemporary of Hammurabi who ultimately sacked Mari. This provides the synchronism Neferhotep I – Yantinu – Zimri-Lim – Hammurabi.

Preceded by Sobekhotep III	Pharaoh of Egypt; 13th Dynasty	Succeeded by Sobekhotep IV
