= Iuhetibu =

Egyptian king's mother

Iuhetibu was an ancient Egyptian king's mother known from several sources as the mother of the 13th Dynasty king Sekhemre-sewadjtawy Sobekhotep, also known as Sobekhotep III, although recent research indicates that he was rather Sobekhotep II. Iuhetibu was the wife of the god's father Mentuhotep. She only appears in sources from the reign of her son. Nothing is known about her life before her son became king. She was the mother of several children. These are king Sobekhotep, the king's son Seneb, the king's son Khakau. Her granddaughter Iuhetibu Fendy, daughter of king Sekhemre-sewadjtawy Sobekhotep was most likely named after her.
