= Nebankh =

Egyptian official

- High steward
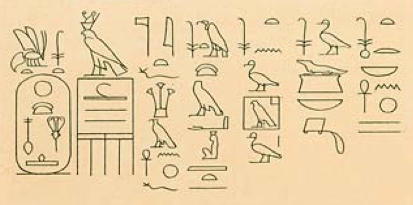
- Inscription of Neferhotep I from Konosso listing the members of his family as well as the Royal acquaintance Nebankh (rightmost column).
Egyptian name
nb Z1 anx n x
- Dynasty: 13th dynasty
- Pharaoh: Sobekhotep IV
- Father: Sobekhotep, steward
- Mother: Hapyu

Nebankh was an ancient Egyptian official of the Thirteenth Dynasty. He is one of the better known personalities of this period.

== Family ==
Nebankh was the son of the steward Sobekhotep. His mother is named Hapyu. His brother Dedusobek Bebi was the father of queen Nubkhaes.

== Career ==
=== King's Acquaintance ===
At Konosso, an inscription listing the members of the royal family of Neferhotep I, also shows treasurer Senebi and king's acquaintance Nebankh. Another colleague was king's acquaintance Rehuankh.

=== High Steward ===
Under king Sobekhotep IV he became high steward. In this position he went on expeditions to the Wadi Hammamat and Wadi el-Hudi.

=== Other attestations ===
Nebankh is known from a high number of monuments, including rock inscriptions and several stelae and a statue, found at Abydos. His heart scarab is so far the oldest datable heart scarab. It is a human-headed green jasper heart scarab with nine lines of hieroglyphics bearing the name of Nebankh.
