= List of pharaonic tombs =

== Overview ==
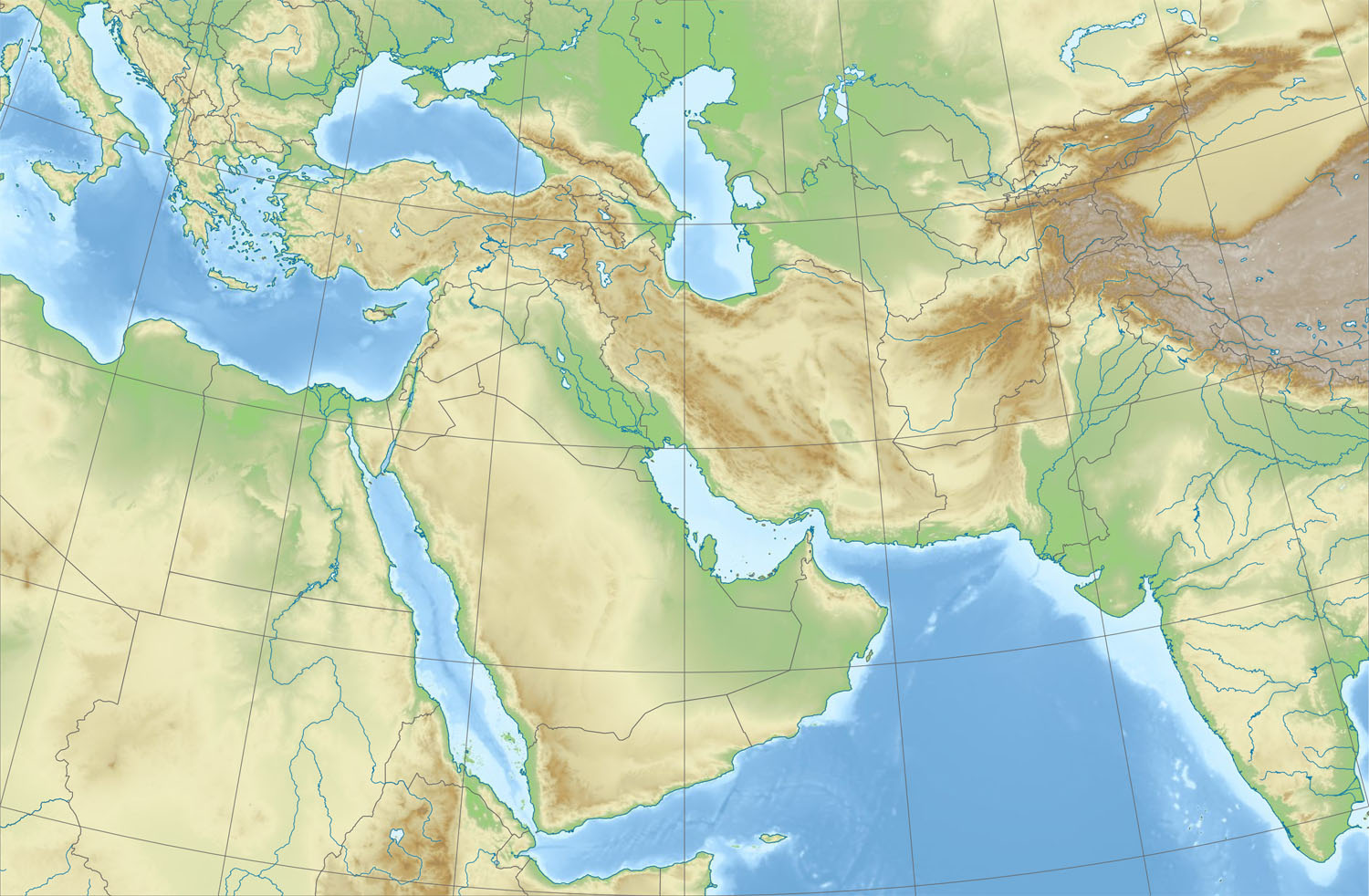
Main regions for pharaonic tombs

Period	Date	Main tomb type	Main site	Main region
Early Dynastic	c. 2900 BC – c. 2545 BC	Mastaba	Umm El Qa'ab	Abydos
Old Kingdom	c. 2543 BC – c. 2120 BC	Pyramid	Saqqara	Memphis
First Intermediate	c. 2118 BC – c. 1980 BC	Saff tomb	El-Tarif	Thebes
Middle Kingdom	c. 1980 BC – c. 1760 BC	Pyramid	Dashur	Memphis
Second Intermediate	c. 1759 BC – c. 1539 BC	Pyramid	Dra' Abu el-Naga'	Thebes
New Kingdom	c. 1539 – 1077 BC	Rock-cut	Valley of the Kings	Thebes
Third Intermediate	1076 BC – 723 BC	Only substructures survived	Tanis	Nile delta
Third Intermediate	1076 BC – 723 BC	Pyramid	El-Kurru	Napata
Late Period	722 BC – 332 BC	Rock-cut	Naqsh-e Rostam	Persepolis
Hellenistic Period	332 BC – 30 BC	Mausoleum	Alexandria	Nile delta
Roman pharaohs	30 BC – c. 311 AD	Mausoleum	Rome	Rome

== Early Dynastic Period ==
Sites of early dynastic pharaonic tombs

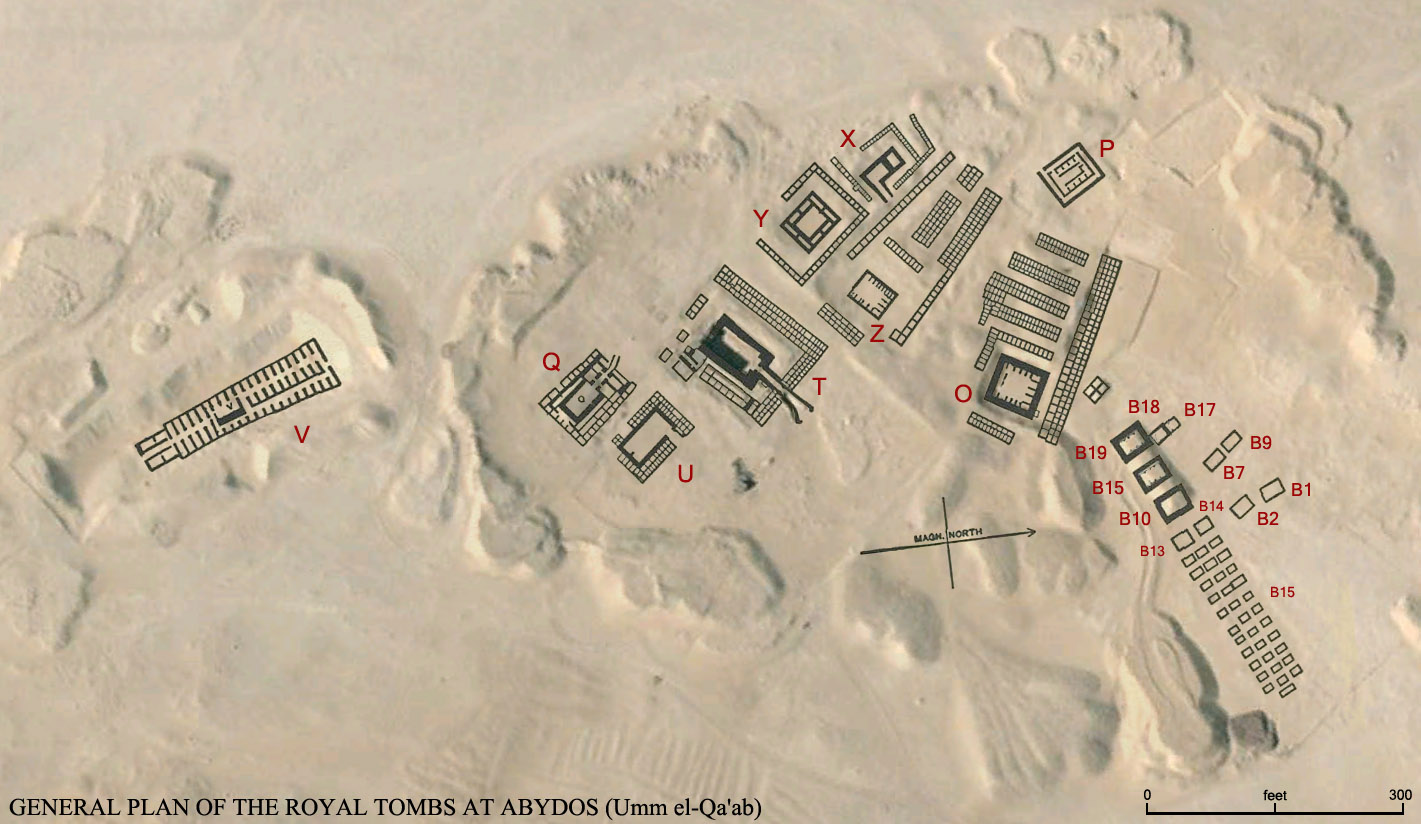
Pharaonic tombs at Umm El Qa'ab

Tomb name	Type	Pharaoh	Site	Region	Ref
Dynasty 0
Tomb U-j	Mastaba	Scorpion I	Umm El Qa'ab	Abydos	
B0/1/2	Mastaba	Iry-Hor	Umm El Qa'ab	Abydos	
B7/9	Mastaba	Ka	Umm El Qa'ab	Abydos	
1st Dynasty c. 2900 BC – c. 2730 BC
B17/B18	Mastaba	Narmer	Umm El Qa'ab	Abydos	
B10/B15/B19, 13/14, B16	Mastaba	Hor-Aha	Umm El Qa'ab	Abydos	
Tomb O	Mastaba	Djer	Umm El Qa'ab	Abydos	
Tomb Z	Mastaba	Djet	Umm El Qa'ab	Abydos	
Tomb Y	Mastaba	Merneith	Umm El Qa'ab	Abydos	
Tomb T	Mastaba	Den	Umm El Qa'ab	Abydos	
Tomb X	Mastaba	Anedjib	Umm El Qa'ab	Abydos	
Tomb U	Mastaba	Semerkhet	Umm El Qa'ab	Abydos	
Tomb Q	Mastaba?	Qa'a	Umm El Qa'ab	Abydos	
2nd Dynasty c. 2730 BC – c. 2590 BC
Gallery Tomb A?	Gallery	Nebra	Saqqara	Memphis	
Gallery Tomb B	Gallery	Nynetjer	Saqqara	Memphis	
Tomb P	Mastaba	Peribsen	Umm El Qa'ab	Abydos	
Tomb V	Mastaba	Khasekhemwy	Umm El Qa'ab	Abydos	

== Old Kingdom ==
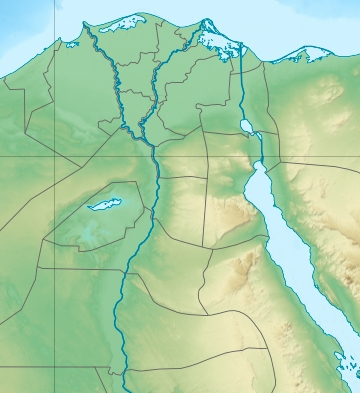
Map of Lower Egypt with sites of Old Kingdom pharaonic tombs

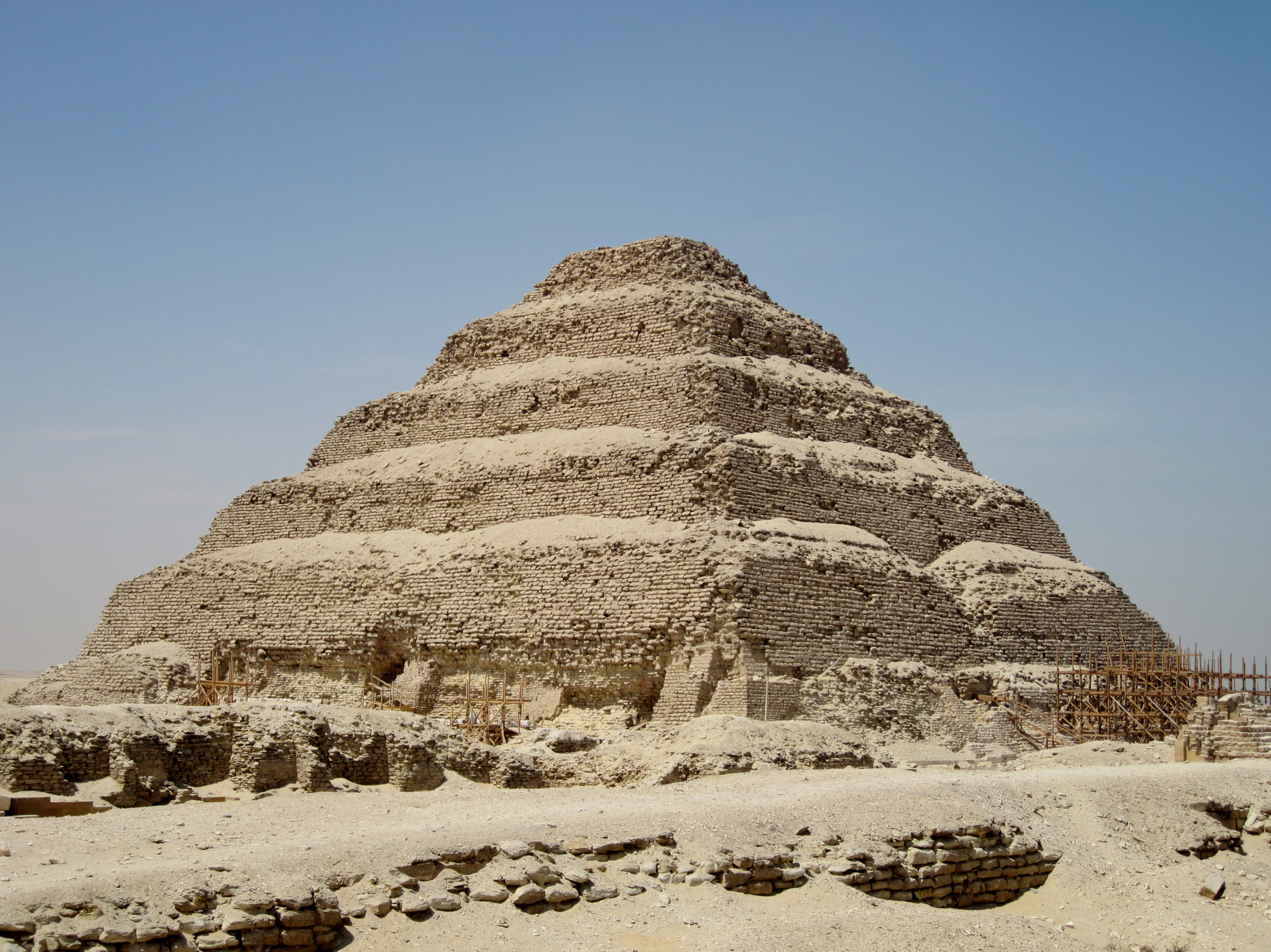
The pyramid of Djoser, the first pharaonic pyramid-tomb

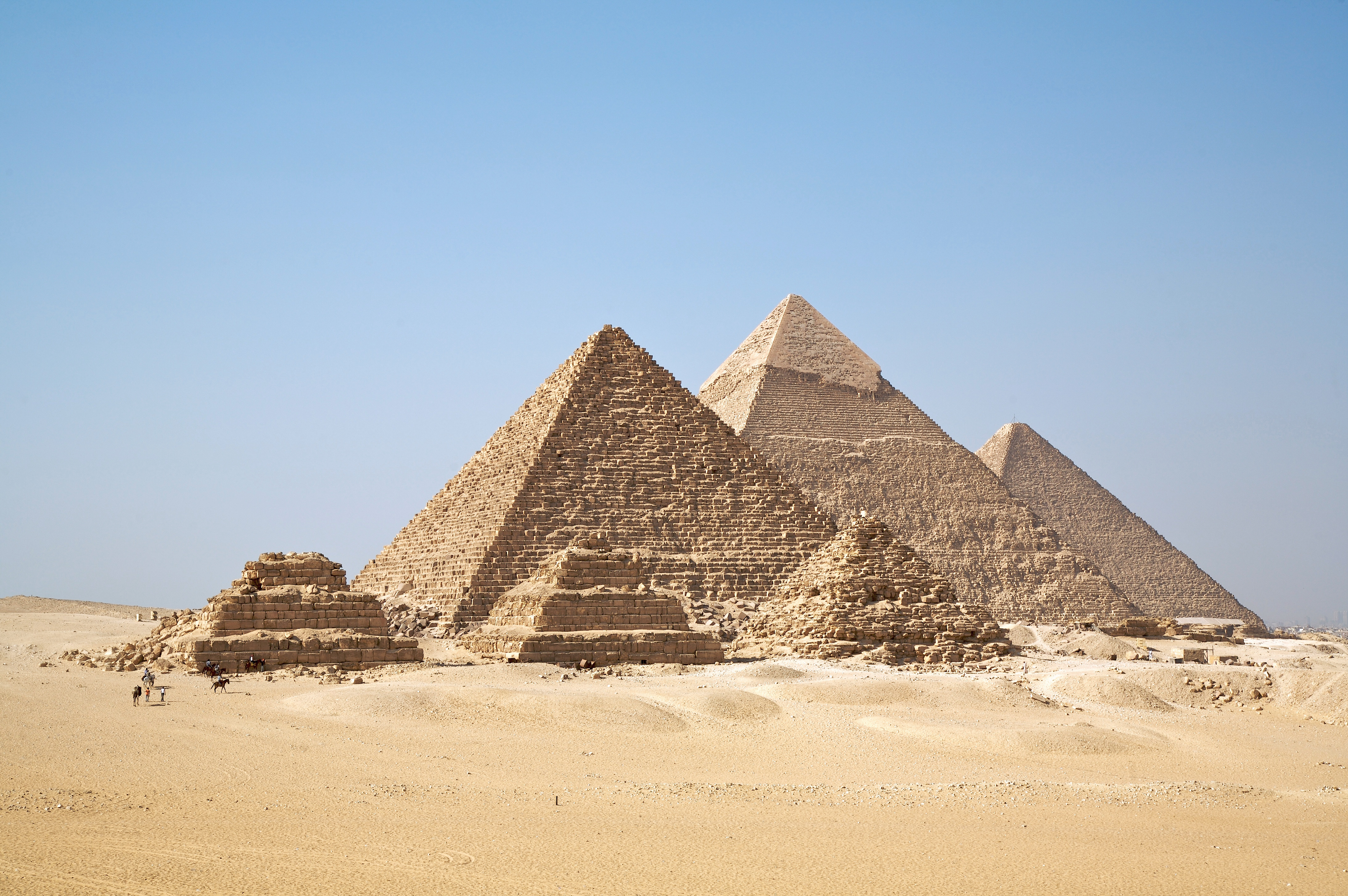
The pyramids of Giza, tombs of 4th dynasty pharaohs Khufu, Khafre and Menkaure

Tomb name	Type	Pharaoh	Site	Region	Ref
3rd Dynasty c. 2592BC – c. 2544 BC
Pyramid of Djoser	Step pyramid	Djoser	Saqqara	Memphis	
Buried Pyramid	Step pyramid (unfinished)	Sekhemkhet	Saqqara	Memphis	
Layer Pyramid	Step pyramid	Khaba	Zawyet El Aryan	Memphis	
4th Dynasty c. 2543 BC – c. 2436 BC
Red Pyramid?	Pyramid	Sneferu	Dahshur	Memphis	
Great Pyramid	Pyramid	Khufu	Giza	Memphis	
Pyramid of Djedefre	Pyramid	Djedefre	Abu Rawash	Memphis	
Pyramid of Khafre	Pyramid	Khafre	Giza	Memphis	
Pyramid of Menkaure	Pyramid	Menkaure	Giza	Memphis	
Pyramid of Bikheris	Pyramid (unfinished)	Bikheris	Zawyet El Aryan	Memphis	
Mastabat al-Fir'aun	Step mastaba	Shepseskaf	South Saqqara	Memphis	
5th Dynasty c. 2435 BC – c. 2306 BC
Pyramid of Userkaf	Pyramid	Userkaf	Saqqara	Memphis	
Pyramid of Sahure	Pyramid	Sahure	Abusir	Memphis	
Pyramid of Neferirkare	Pyramid (unfinished)	Neferirkare	Abusir	Memphis	
Pyramid of Neferefre	Pyramid	Neferefre	Abusir	Memphis	
Pyramid of Nyuserre	Pyramid	Nyuserre	Abusir	Memphis	
Headless Pyramid	Pyramid	Menkauhor	Saqqara	Memphis	
Pyramid of Djedkare	Pyramid	Djedkare	Saqqara	Memphis	
Pyramid of Unas	Pyramid	Unas	Saqqara	Memphis	
6th Dynasty c. 2305 BC – c. 2118 BC
Pyramid of Teti	Pyramid	Teti	Saqqara	Memphis	
Pyramid of Pepi I	Pyramid	Pepi I	South Saqqara	Memphis	
Pyramid of Merenre	Pyramid	Merenre	South Saqqara	Memphis	
Pyramid of Pepi II	Pyramid	Pepi II	South Saqqara	Memphis	

== First Intermediate Period ==
Sites of pharaonic tombs of the First Intermediate Period

Tomb name	Type	Pharaoh	Site	Region	Ref
8th Dynasty c. 2150 BC – c. 2118 BC
Pyramid of Qakara Ibi	Pyramid	Qakare Ibi	South Saqqara	Memphis	
Pyramid of Khui	Pyramid	Khui	Dara	Middle Egypt	
11th Dynasty c. 2080 BC – c. 1940 BC
Tomb of Intef I	Saff tomb	Intef I	El-Tarif	Thebes	
Tomb of Intef II	Saff tomb	Intef II	El-Tarif	Thebes	
Tomb of Intef III	Saff tomb	Intef III	El-Tarif	Thebes	
Tomb of Mentuhotep II	Saff tomb	Mentuhotep II	Deir el-Bahari	Thebes	
Tomb of Mentuhotep III	Saff tomb	Mentuhotep III	Deir el-Bahari	Thebes	

== Middle Kingdom ==
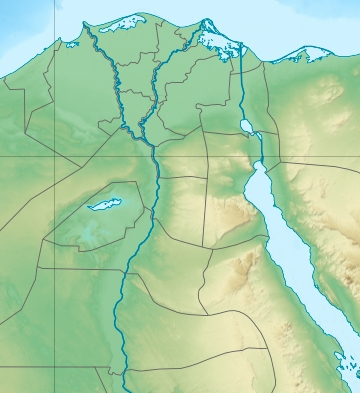
Sites of Middle Kingdom pharaonic tombs

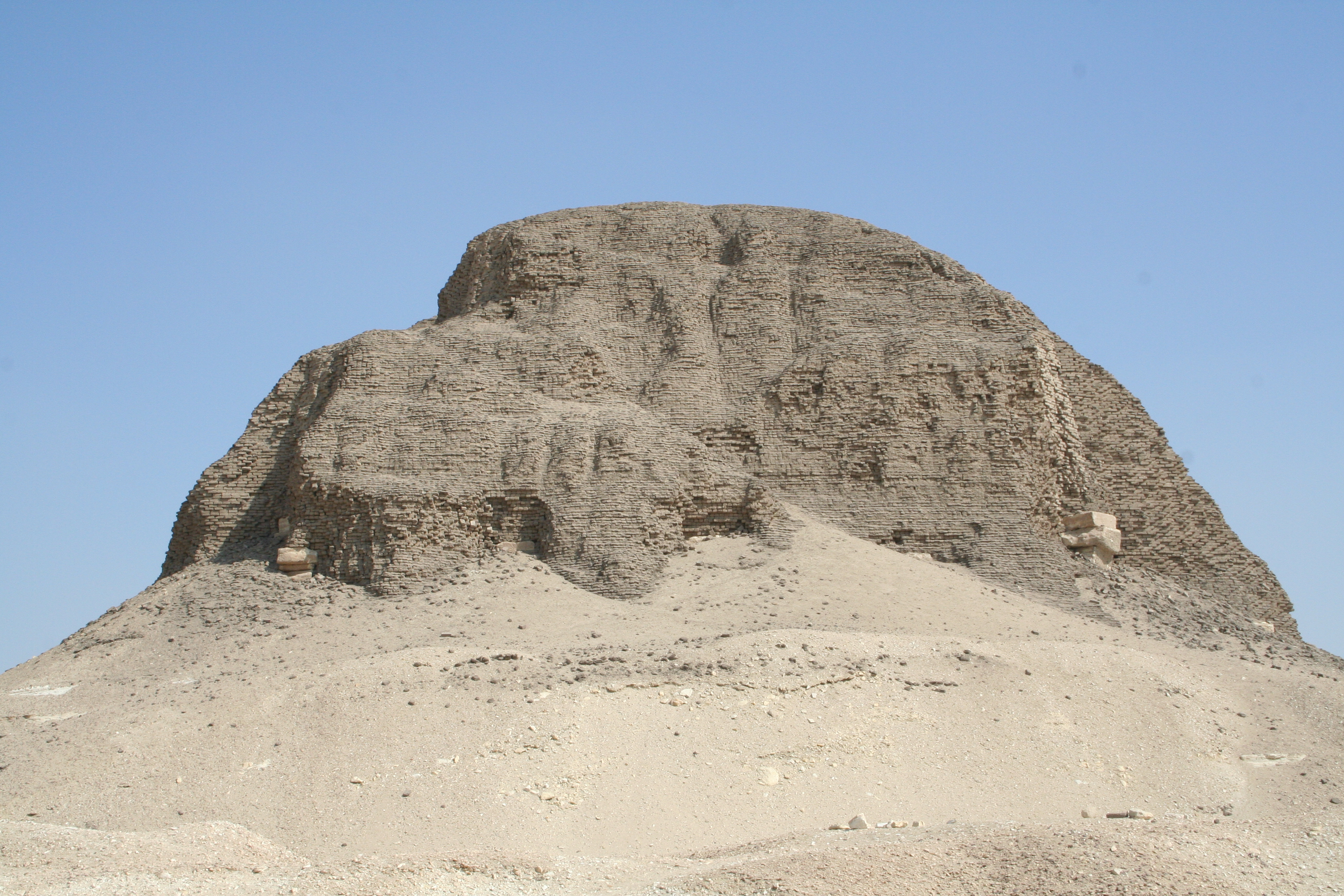
The Middle Kingdom Pyramid of Senusret II at El Lahun

Tomb name	Type	Pharaoh	Site	Region	Ref
12th Dynasty c. 1939 BC – c. 1760 BC
Pyramid of Amenemhat I	Pyramid	Amenemhat I	Lisht	Memphis	
Pyramid of Senusret I	Pyramid	Senusret I	Lisht	Memphis	
White Pyramid	Pyramid	Amenemhat II	Dashur	Memphis	
Pyramid of Senusret II	Pyramid	Senusret II	El Lahun	Faiyum	
Pyramid of Senusret III (cenotaph?)	Pyramid	Senusret III	Dashur	Memphis	
Tomb of Senwosret III	Subterranean	Senusret III	South Abydos	Abydos	
Black Pyramid	Pyramid	Amenemhat III	Dashur	Memphis	
Hawara pyramid	Pyramid	Amenemhat III	Hawara	Faiyum	
Southern Mazghuna pyramid?	Pyramid	Amenemhat IV	Dashur	Memphis	
Northern Mazghuna pyramid?	Pyramid	Sobekneferu	Dashur	Memphis	
13th Dynasty c. 1759 BC – c. 1630 BC
Pyramid of Ameny Qemau	Pyramid	Ameny Qemau	Dashur	Memphis	
Tomb of Hor	Shaft	Hor	Dashur	Memphis	
Pyramid of Khendjer	Pyramid	Userkare Khendjer	South Saqqara	Memphis	
S9	Pyramid?	Neferhotep I	South Abydos	Abydos	
S10	Pyramid?	Sobekhotep IV	South Abydos	Abydos	

== Second Intermediate Period ==
Sites of pharaonic tombs of the Second Intermediate Period

Tomb name	Type	Pharaoh	Site	Region	Ref
15th Dynasty ? – c. 1530 BC
CS9	Pyramid?	Senebkay	South Abydos	Abydos	
17th Dynasty ? – c. 1540 BC
Pyramid of Sobekemsaf I	Pyramid	Sobekemsaf I	Dra' Abu el-Naga'	Thebes	
Pyramid of Intef V	Pyramid	Intef V	Dra' Abu el-Naga'	Thebes	
Pyramid of Intef VI	Pyramid	Intef VI	Dra' Abu el-Naga'	Thebes	

== New Kingdom ==
Sites of New Kingdom pharaonic tombs

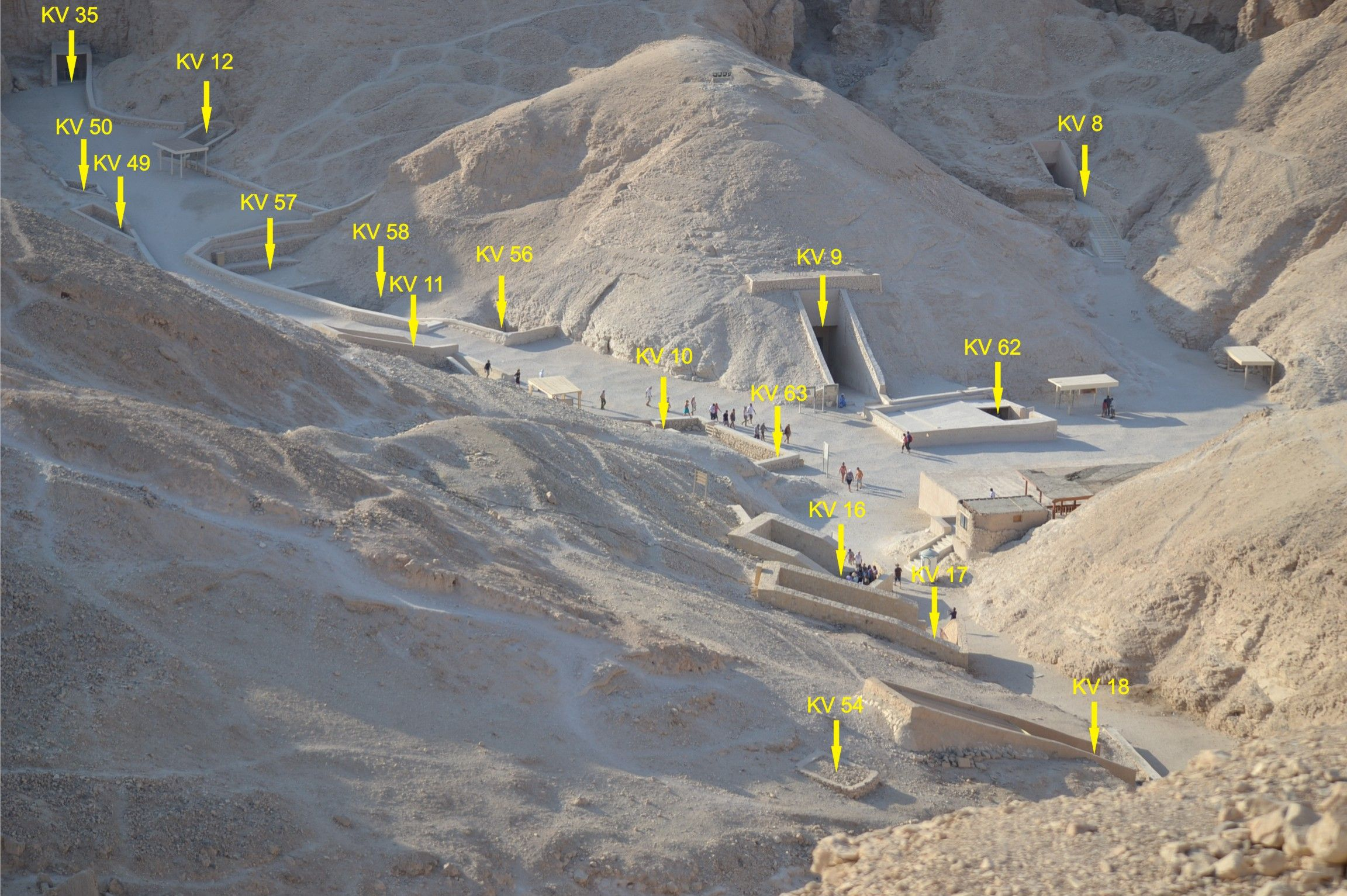
The Valley of the Kings, burial place of most New Kingdom pharaohs

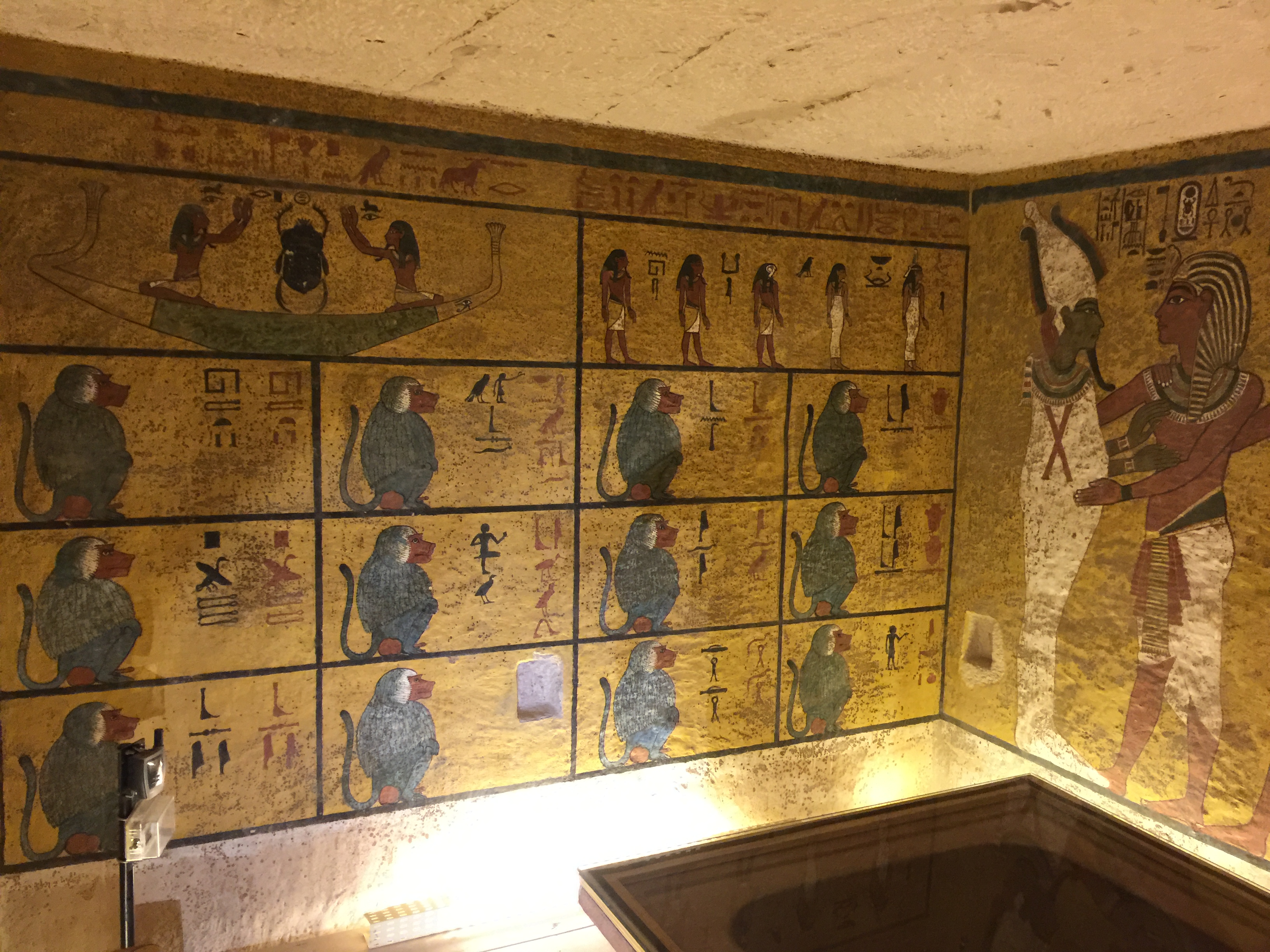
Interior of the Tomb of Tutankhamun (KV62)

Tomb name	Type	Pharaoh	Site	Region	Ref
18th Dynasty c. 1539 BC – c. 1292 BC
Pyramid of Ahmose (cenotaph); ANB	Pyramid	Ahmose I	Abydos-soth; Dra' Abu el-Naga'	Abydos	
KV39? Tomb ANB?	Rock-cut	Amenhotep I	Valley of the Kings; Dra' Abu el-Naga'	Thebes	
KV20?, KV38	Rock-cut	Thutmose I	Valley of the Kings	Thebes	
Tomb of Thutmose II	Rock-cut	Thutmose II	Wadi Gabbanat el-Qurud	Thebes	
KV34	Rock-cut	Thutmose III	Valley of the Kings	Thebes	
KV20	Rock-cut	Hatshepsut	Valley of the Kings	Thebes	
KV35	Rock-cut	Amenhotep II	Valley of the Kings	Thebes	
KV43	Rock-cut	Thutmose IV	Valley of the Kings	Thebes	
KV22	Rock-cut	Amenhotep III	Valley of the Kings	Thebes	
Royal Tomb of Akhenaten	Rock-cut	Akhenaten	Royal Wadi	Amarna	
KV55	Rock-cut	Akhenaten? Smenkhkare	Valley of the Kings	Thebes	
KV62	Rock-cut	Tutankhamun	Valley of the Kings	Thebes	
KV23	Rock-cut	Ay	Valley of the Kings	Thebes	
KV57	Rock-cut	Horemheb	Valley of the Kings	Thebes	
19th Dynasty 1292 BC – 1191 BC
KV16	Rock-cut	Ramesses I	Valley of the Kings	Thebes	
KV17	Rock-cut	Seti I	Valley of the Kings	Thebes	
KV7	Rock-cut	Ramesses II	Valley of the Kings	Thebes	
KV8	Rock-cut	Merneptah	Valley of the Kings	Thebes	
KV15	Rock-cut	Seti II	Valley of the Kings	Thebes	
KV10	Rock-cut	Amenmesse	Valley of the Kings	Thebes	
KV47	Rock-cut	Siptah	Valley of the Kings	Thebes	
KV14	Rock-cut	Twosret	Valley of the Kings	Thebes	
20th Dynasty 1190 BC – 1077 BC
KV14	Rock-cut	Setnakhte	Valley of the Kings	Thebes	
KV11	Rock-cut	Ramesses III	Valley of the Kings	Thebes	
KV2	Rock-cut	Ramesses IV	Valley of the Kings	Thebes	
KV9	Rock-cut	Ramesses V, Ramesses VI	Valley of the Kings	Thebes	
KV1	Rock-cut	Ramesses VII	Valley of the Kings	Thebes	
KV6	Rock-cut	Ramesses IX	Valley of the Kings	Thebes	
KV18	Rock-cut	Ramesses X	Valley of the Kings	Thebes	
KV4	Rock-cut	Ramesses XI	Valley of the Kings	Thebes	

== Third Intermediate Period ==
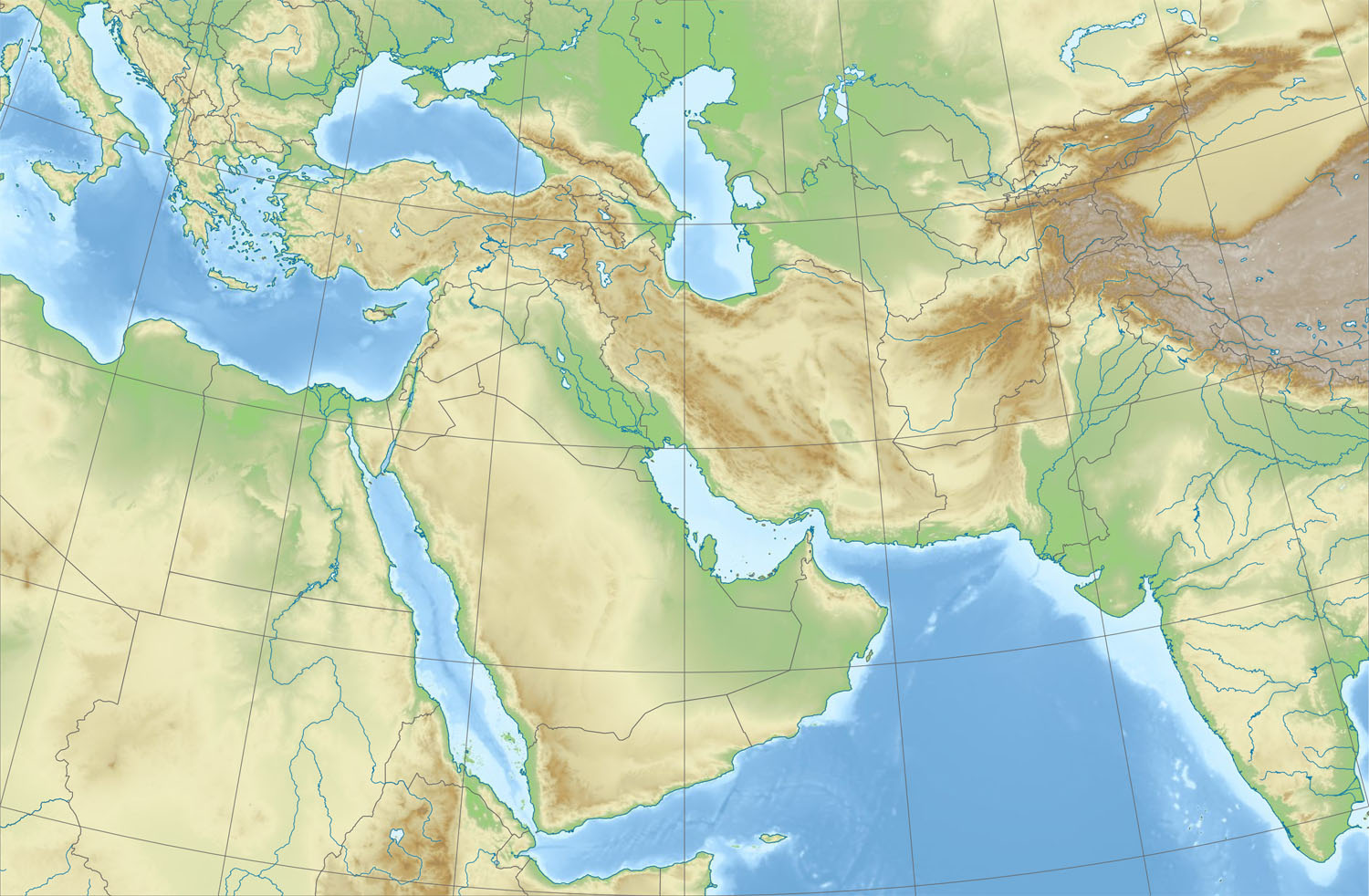
Locations of pharaonic tombs of the Third Intermediate Period

Nuri pyramids

Tomb name	Type	Pharaoh(s)	Site	Region	Ref
21st Dynasty 1076 BC – 944 BC
NRT I	Unknown	Smendes Takelot I	Tanis	Nile Delta	
NRT III	Unknown	Psusennes I Amenemope Siamun Psusennes II	Tanis	Nile Delta	
NRT IV	Unknown	Amenemope	Tanis	Nile Delta	
22nd Dynasty 943 BC – c. 746 BC
NRT I	Unknown	Takelot I Osorkon II	Tanis	Nile Delta	
NRT III	Unknown	Shoshenq II (reburial)	Tanis	Nile Delta	
NRT V	Unknown	Shoshenq III Shoshenq IV	Tanis	Nile Delta	
NRT II	Unknown	Pami	Tanis	Nile Delta	
23rd Dynasty 837 BC – c. 728 BC
MH1	Unknown	Harsiese A	Medinet Habu	Thebes	
25th Dynasty 722 BC – c. 655 BC
Ku.8?	Pyramid	Kashta	El-Kurru	Kush, Nubia	
Ku.7	Pyramid	Piye	El-Kurru	Kush, Nubia	
Ku.18	Pyramid	Shebitku	El-Kurru	Kush, Nubia	
Ku.15	Pyramid	Shabaka	El-Kurru	Kush, Nubia	
Nu.1	Pyramid	Taharqa	Nuri	Kush, Nubia	
Ku.16	Pyramid	Tantamani	El-Kurru	Kush, Nubia	

== Late Period ==
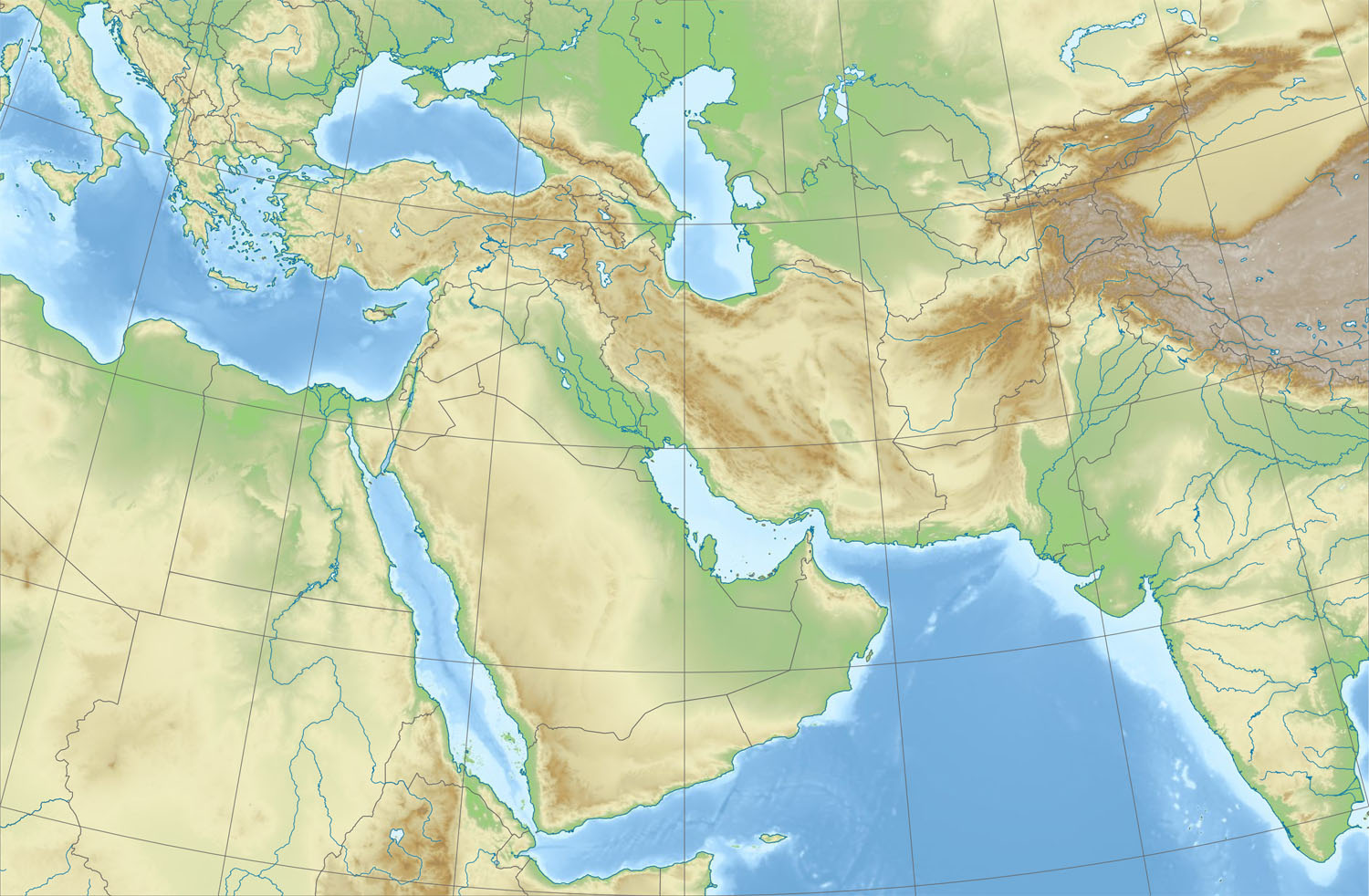
Locations of pharaonic tombs of the Late Period

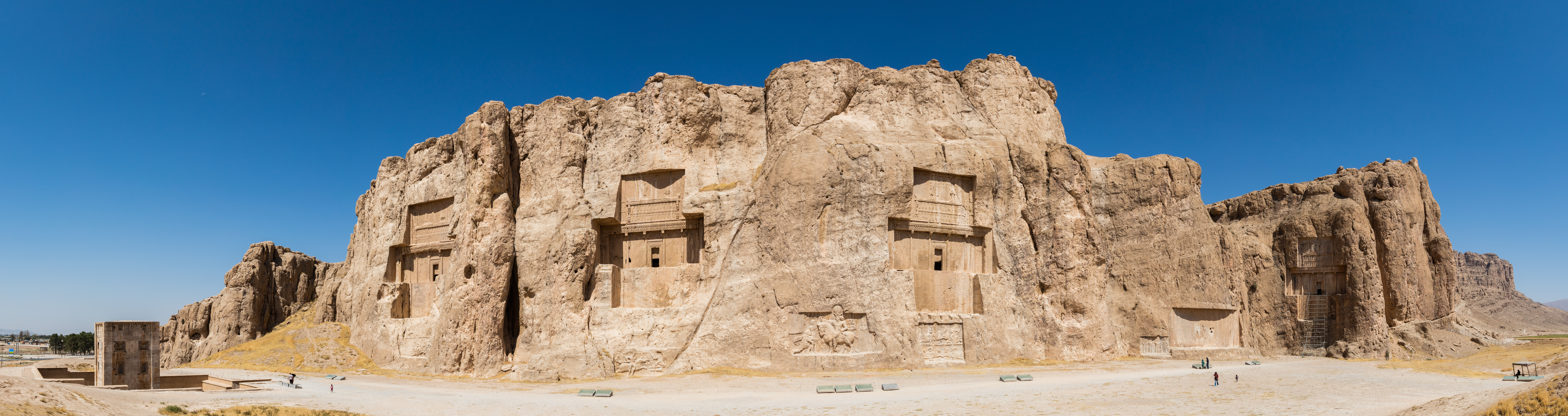
Tombs of Persian pharaohs at Naqsh-e Rustam

Tomb name	Type	Pharaoh	Site	Region	Ref
27th Dynasty 525 BC – 404 BC
Nashq-e rustam I	Rock-cut	Darius the Great	Naqsh-e Rostam	Iran	
Nashq-e rustam IV?	Rock-cut	Xerxes I	Naqsh-e Rostam	Iran	
Nashq-e rustam III?	Rock-cut	Artaxerxes I	Naqsh-e Rostam	Iran	
Nashq-e rustam II?	Rock-cut	Darius II	Naqsh-e Rostam	Iran	
29th Dynasty 399 BC – 380 BC
Tomb of Nepherites I	Unknown	Nepherites I	Mendes	Nile Delta	
31st Dynasty 343 BC – 322 BC
Persepolis V	Rock-cut	Artaxerxes III?	Persepolis	Iran	
Persepolis VII	Rock-cut	Arses of Persia? Darius III?	Persepolis	Iran	

== Hellenistic Period ==
Sites of tombs of Hellenistic pharaohs

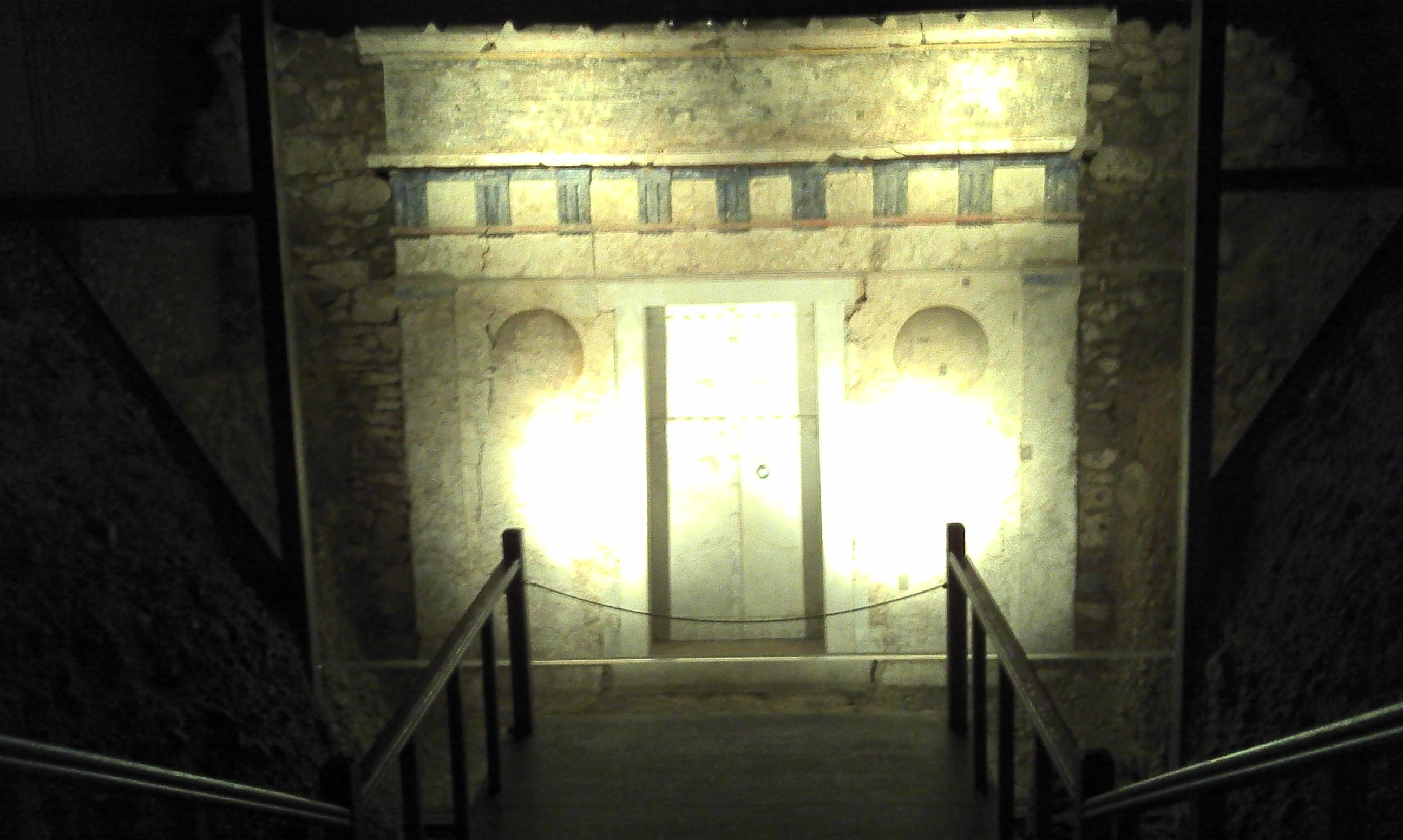
Tomb of Alexander IV

Tomb name	Type	Pharaoh	Site	Region	Ref
Argead Dynasty 332 BC – 304 BC
Tomb of Alexander the Great	Unknown	Alexander the Great	Memphis	Memphis	
Latter tomb of Alexander the Great	Unknown	Alexander the Great	Alexandria	Nile Delta	
Tomb of Philip III (Tomb II)	Chamber tomb	Philip III	Vergina	Greece	
Tomb III	Chamber tomb	Alexander IV	Vergina	Greece	
Ptolemaic dynasty 305 BC – 30 BC
Mausoleum at Ptolemais	Mausoleum	Ptolemy VIII?	Ptolemais	Libya	
Tomb of Antony and Cleopatra	Unknown	Cleopatra VII	Alexandria	Nile Delta	

== Roman Egypt ==
Sites of tombs of Roman pharaohs

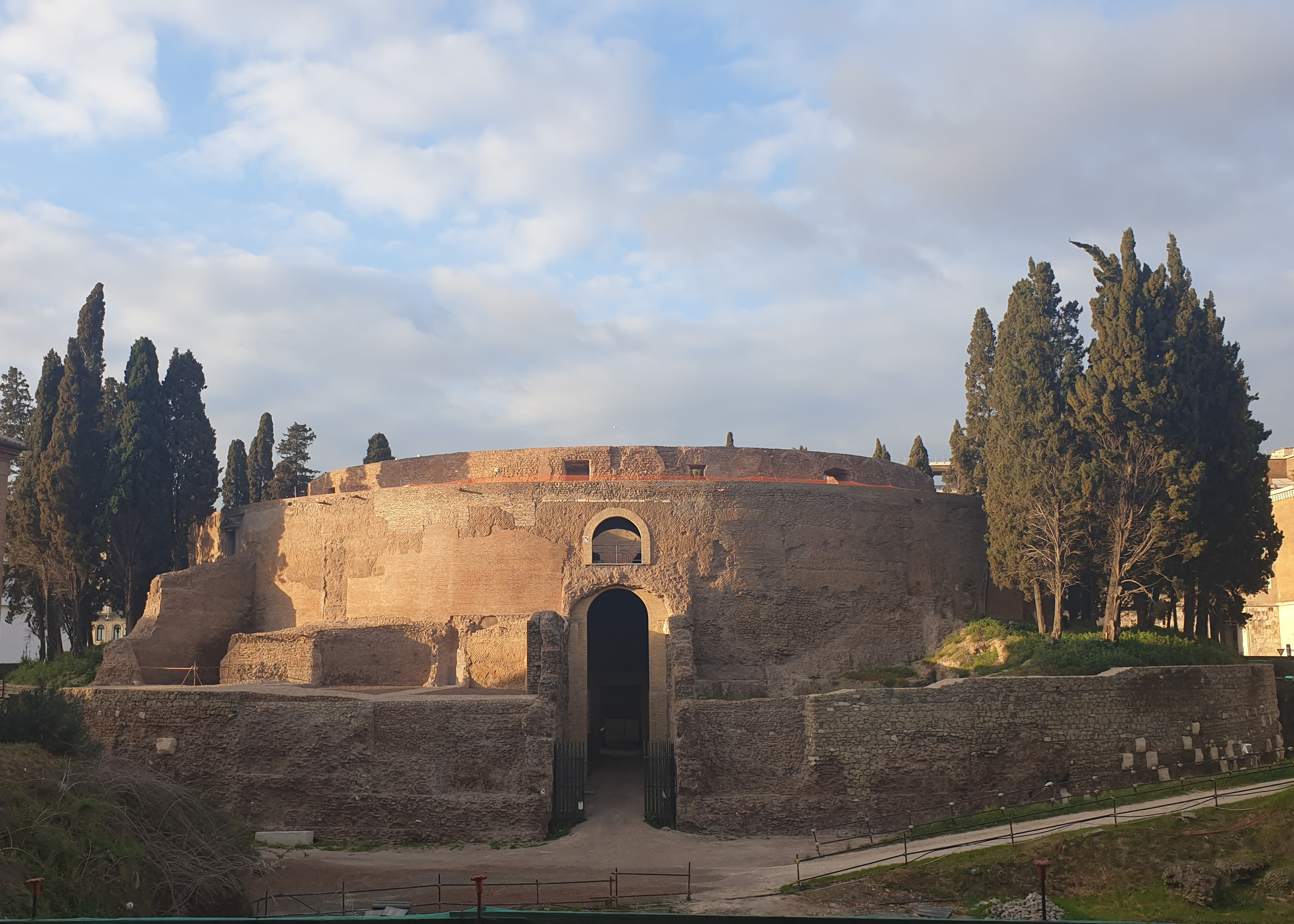
The Mausoleum of Augustus

Tomb name	Type	Pharaoh	Site	Region	Ref
Roman pharaohs 30 BC – 313 AD
Mausoleum of Augustus	Mausoleum	Augustus	Rome	Italy	
Mausoleum of Augustus	Mausoleum	Tiberius	Rome	Italy	
Mausoleum of Augustus	Mausoleum	Claudius	Rome	Italy	
Mausoleum of Augustus	Mausoleum	Vespasian	Rome	Italy	
Mausoleum of Augustus	Mausoleum	Nerva	Rome	Italy	
Mausoleum of the Domitii	Mausoleum	Nero	Rome	Italy	
Trajan's Column	Column	Trajan	Rome	Italy	
Mausoleum of Hadrian	Mausoleum	Hadrian	Rome	Italy	
Mausoleum of Hadrian	Mausoleum	Antoninus Pius	Rome	Italy	
Mausoleum of Hadrian	Mausoleum	Lucius Verus	Rome	Italy	
Mausoleum of Hadrian	Mausoleum	Marcus Aurelius	Rome	Italy	
Mausoleum of Hadrian	Mausoleum	Commodus	Rome	Italy	
Mausoleum of Hadrian	Mausoleum	Septimius Severus	Rome	Italy	
Mausoleum of Hadrian	Mausoleum	Geta	Rome	Italy	
Mausoleum of Hadrian	Mausoleum	Caracalla	Rome	Italy	
Rotunda of Galerius	Mausoleum	Galerius	Felix Romuliana	Serbia	

== See also ==
- List of burials in the Valley of the Kings
- List of Egyptian pyramids
- List of pharaohs
- List of tombs and mausoleums
