= Hors (disambiguation) =

Hors is a Slavic deity.

Hors may also refer to:

- Hors, Armenia, a village
- Hors (river), a river in Armenia

== See also ==
- Hors catégorie, a term in bicycle racing
- Horse (disambiguation)
- Hor
- Khors (disambiguation)
