= Hor =

Hor or HOR may refer to:

== People ==
- Hor Awibre, an Egyptian pharaoh of the 13th Dynasty
- Hor (high steward), an ancient Egyptian official
- Hor son of Punesh, legendary ancient Egyptian magician
- Hor Nambora (born 1957), Cambodian diplomat
- Hor Namhong (born 1935), Cambodian diplomat
- Hello Hor (born 1994), Taiwanese stand-up comedian
- Isaac Hor (born 1946), Malaysian artist
- Hor, a fourth century Christian martyr; see Hor, Besoy, and Daydara
- Hor, a martyr of the Coptic Church; see Hor and Susia
- A Hokkien romanization of the surname He (surname)

== Places ==
- Hor, Tibet, or Huo'er, a township
- Mount Hor, two mountains listed in the Bible
- Mount Hor (Vermont), USA
- River Hor, England

== Other uses ==
- Horus or Hor, an ancient Egyptian deity
- Horo language, an extinct language of Chad
- Hooven-Owens-Rentschler, a manufacturer of steam and diesel engines
- Hor, abbreviation for Horologium (constellation)
- HOR, IATA airport code for Horta Airport, serving Horta, Portugal
- HOR, station code for Horley railway station, Surrey, England
- HoR, abbreviation for the House of Representatives
