= Khors (disambiguation) =

Khors is a Slavic deity.

Khors may also refer to:

- Khors (band), a Ukrainian metal band
- Khors Air, a Ukrainian airline

== See also ==
- Hors (disambiguation)
- Khor (disambiguation)
