= Hor, Besoy, and Daydara =

Egyptian Christian martyrs

Saints Hor, Besoy and Daydara

Martyrs
- Born: 4th century Alexandria, Egypt
- Died: 4th century Alexandria, Egypt
- Venerated in: Coptic Orthodox Church; Assyrian Church of the East
- Feast: 23 June

Abba Hor (Coptic: ϩⲱⲣ), Besoy (Coptic: ⲯⲟⲓ; also known as Psoi and Absahi), and Daydara (Coptic: ⲑⲉⲟⲇⲱⲣⲁ; also known as Didra or Theodora) were Christian martyrs in Egypt in the fourth century.

Hor was a soldier. With his brother Besoy, he confessed to his belief in Christianity at Alexandria during the Diocletian Persecution.

Hor was subjected to prolonged torture before being pierced by a lance. Besoy was decapitated. Their mother, Daydara, died under torture.

They are regarded as saints, with a feast day of 23 June in the Coptic Church and the Assyrian Church of the East.

Besoy also has a separate feast day on 24 August.
