= Isaac Hor =

- Born: 10 September 1984 (age 42); Ipoh, Perak, Malaysia
- Education: Multimedia Design, Marketing, French language
- Alma mater: Universiti Malaysia Sabah
- Occupations: Film Director, Actor, Host
- Years active: 2007–present
- Website: www.126creative.com

Isaac Hor (賀傾文; Jyutping: Ho6 King1 Man4; Pe̍h-ōe-jī: Hō Kheng-bûn) is a Malaysian artist. His profession includes film director, actor and host.

== Acting ==
Year	Works	Character
2011	Fu Xing Hao Chinese New Year Album	Actor
2011	Jia Yu Home Entertainment, Astro 304 Chinese New Year Special Drama	Actor
2011	Kampus West City Commercial Video	Leading Actor
2012	Guinness St. Patrick's 2012 Opening Video	Actor
2012	Unfulfilled Donation Public Service Announcement	Leading Actor - Son
2013	Coming Home Telemovie	Second Main Actor
2013	Love Reunion Online Movie	Supporting Hero Role - Robber
2013	Not Enough Strength Online Movie	Leading Actor
2013	Romance SOS Online Movie	Second Main Actor - Isaac
2013	Good Bye Mum Public Service Announcement	Leading Actor - Son
2013	The Painting Short Film	Main Actor - Cecilia Yan
2014	Bad Student? 2 Online Film	Guest Actor - Teacher Wei
2014	The Doll on the Rooftop Online Film	Guest Actor - Teacher Zhuang
2014	Unlock Short Film	Main Actor
2014	The Taste Short Film	Main Actor
2014	419 Short Film	Actor - Receptionist/Killer
2015	Fantasia TV Drama	Guest Actor - Mr Lee
2015	Shadow Short Film	Main Actor
2015	The Cycle of Violence Short Film	Main Actor - Husband
2015	Wall Short Film	Actor
2015	Move On Short Film	Main Actor
2016	Aset Kayamas Property Chinese New Year Advertisement My Dream Home	Actor - Eldest brother
2016	Sin Chew Media Corporation VJSearch Demonstration Video	Actor - Lin Xiao Ming

== Production ==
Year	Works	Position
2012	Unfulfilled Donation Public Service Announcement	Producer, Script Writer
2013	Love Reunion Online Movie	Producer
2013	Romance SOS Online Movie	Director
2014	Pregnation Short Film	Director
2014	Unlock Short Film	Director, Script Writer
2015	Bleeding Love Short Film	Director

== Others ==
Year	Event/Program
2011	Breath Together With Youngster 2011 (Speaker); Generasi Bersih 709 (Speaker)
2012	Taiwan Treasure Hunt 2012 (Promotion Video Ambassador); AiFM Program (Guest); MediaRakyat.Net Program "Rakyat Bersuara" (Guest)
2015	ONFM "01 Hotline" Program (Guest); ONFM "38 Bla Bla Bla" Program (Guest)
2016	VJSearch Roadshow @Southern University College, Johor (Guest Speaker)

== Achievement ==
Short Film	Festival/Contest	Awards
Unfulfilled Donation	Organ Donation Video Contest 2012 by JCI Pearl	Second Runner Up
Pregnation	World Chinese Micro Film Competition 2014	Prize of Excellence Award
Pregnation	Golden Pomegranate International Film Festival 2014	Most Creative Micro Movie Award
Pregnation	China Linyi Inaugural National Micro Film Competition 2014	Best Screenplay Award
Pregnation	4th Beijing International Micro Film Festival	Nominated for Best Story Award
Pregnation	ClujShorts International Short Film Festival 2015, Romania	Shortlisted
Pregnation	13th Sichuan TV Festival International "Gold Panda" Awards for New Media	Most Innovative Short Web Series Selection
Unlock	BMW Shorties 2014	Best Actor Award
Unlock	Shenzhen International Micro-Film Festival 2015	Nominated for Jury Award
Unlock	Vancouver Island Short Film Festival 2016	Best Performance Award

== Media reports ==
- "贺倾文王庆玲-携手再拍同志微电影". Sin Chew Daily (in Chinese). 23 July 2015. Archived from the original on 15 April 2016.
- "贺倾文将开拍同志短片并首次挑战90分钟电影". NewsKaki (in Chinese). 22 July 2015.
- "导演贺倾文执导崎岖路-遇贵人崛起". Guang Ming Daily (in Chinese). 23 January 2015.
- "《命孕》夺奖-贺倾文：用奖金拍公益短片". Sin Chew Daily (in Chinese). 29 November 2014. Archived from the original on 15 April 2016.
