= Roman pharaoh =

Role of Roman emperors in Egypt

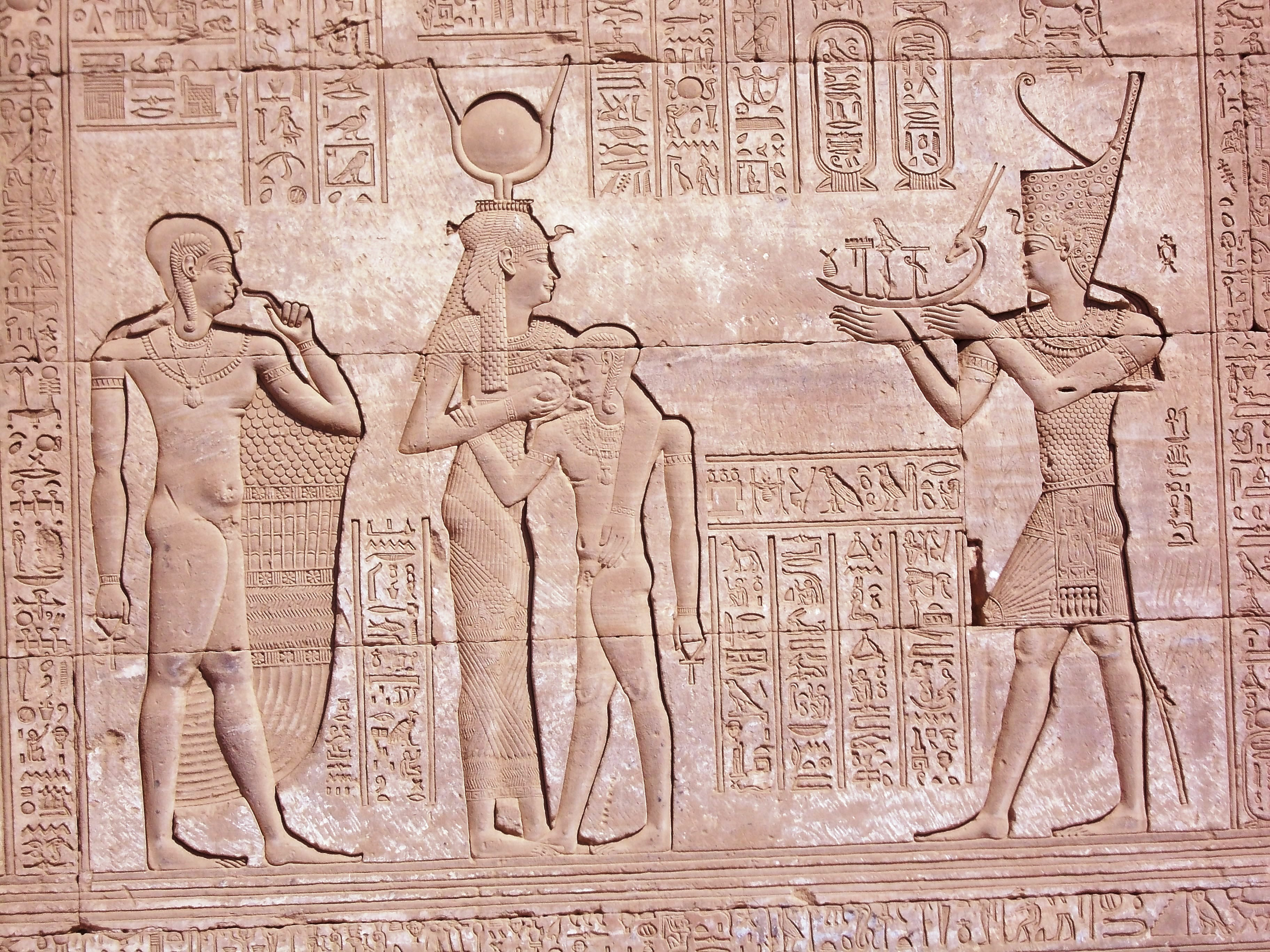
Egyptian relief at Dendera depicting Trajan (right, r. 98–117) in full pharaonic garb, sacrificing goods to the goddess Hathor and her son Ihy

The Roman pharaohs, rarely referred to as ancient Egypt's Thirty-fourth Dynasty, (Note: The last dynasty identified with a number by most egyptologists is the Thirty-first Dynasty (when the Persians ruled Egypt for the second time). If the Romans are numbered as the "Thirty-fourth Dynasty", the Argead dynasty of Alexander the Great is considered the Thirty-second Dynasty and the Ptolemaic Kingdom is considered the Thirty-third Dynasty.) were the Roman emperors in their capacity as rulers of Egypt, especially in Egyptology. After Egypt was incorporated into the Roman Republic in 30 BC by Octavian, the people and especially the priesthood of the country continued to recognize the Roman emperors as pharaohs, according them traditional pharaonic titularies and depicting them with traditional pharaonic garb, engaging in traditional pharaonic activities, in artwork and at temples throughout Egypt.

Though the Egyptians themselves considered the Romans to be their pharaohs and the legitimate successors of the ancient pharaohs, the emperors themselves never adopted any pharaonic titles or traditions outside of Egypt, as these would have been hard to justify in the Roman world at large. Most emperors probably gave the status accorded to them by the Egyptians little care and rarely visited the province more than once in their lifetime. Their role as god-kings was only ever officially acknowledged by the Egyptians themselves. This was a sharp contrast to the preceding dynasty of the Hellenistic Ptolemaic Kingdom, who had spent the majority of their lives in Egypt. Pharaohs before Egypt's incorporation into the Achaemenid Empire in the Late Period had also all ruled the country from within Egypt. Egypt was, however, governed differently from other Roman provinces, with emperors hand-picking governors for the region and often treating it more like a personal possession than a province. Though not all emperors were recognized as pharaohs, Egyptian religion demanded the presence of a pharaoh to act as the intermediate between humanity and the gods. The emperors filling this role proved to be the most simple solution, and was similar to how the Persians had been regarded as pharaohs centuries prior (constituting the Twenty-seventh and Thirty-first dynasties).

Though Egypt continued to be a part of the Roman Empire until it was conquered by the Rashidun Caliphate in 641 AD, the last Roman emperor to be conferred the title of pharaoh was Maximinus Daza (reigned 311–313 AD). By his time, the view of Romans as pharaohs had already been declining for some time due to Egypt being on the periphery of the Roman Empire (in contrast to the traditional pharaonic view of Egypt as the center of the world). The spread of Christianity throughout the empire in the 4th century, and the transformation of Egypt's capital Alexandria into a major Christian center, decisively ended the tradition, due to the new religion being incompatible with the traditional implications of being pharaoh.

The names of the emperors were written in hieroglyphs phonetically, based on the renditions of their names in Greek. This way of rendering the names led to the Roman pharaohs having a significant impact on modern Egyptology since the readings of their names marked an important step in the decipherment of hieroglyphs.

== History ==
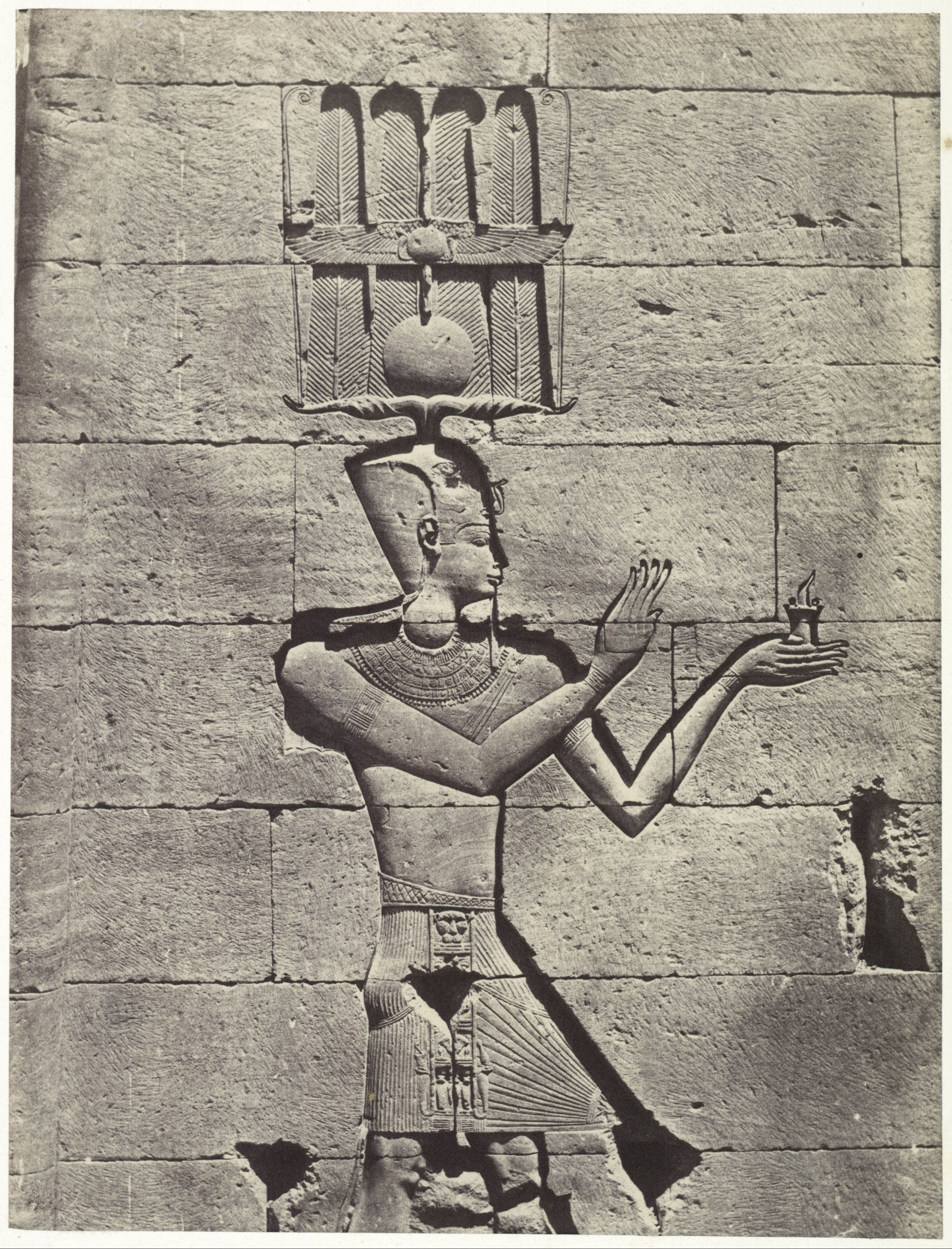
Augustus (r. 27 BC–AD 14) depicted as pharaoh in the Temple of Kalabsha

In 30 BC, Egypt became a province of the Roman Republic, which was shortly thereafter in 27 BC transformed into the Roman Empire. Roman emperors were accorded the title of pharaoh, although exclusively while in Egypt. As such, not all Roman emperors were recognized as pharaohs. Although Octavian, the first Roman emperor, made a point of not taking the Pharaonic crown when he conquered Egypt, which would have been difficult to justify to the wider empire considering the vast amount of propaganda which he had spread about the "exotic" behavior of Cleopatra and Antony, the native population of Egypt regarded him as the pharaoh succeeding Cleopatra and Caesarion. Depictions of Octavian, now called Augustus, in traditional pharaonic garbs (wearing different crowns and the traditional kilt) and sacrificing goods to various Egyptian gods were made as early as around 15 BC and they are present in the Temple of Dendur, built by Gaius Petronius, the Roman governor of Egypt. Even earlier than that, Augustus had been accorded royal titles in the Egyptian version of a 29 BC stele made by Cornelius Gallus, despite royal titles not being present in the Latin or Greek-language versions of the same text.

Unlike the preceding Ptolemaic pharaohs and pharaohs of other previous foreign dynasties, the Roman emperors were rarely physically present in Egypt. As such, the traditional role of the pharaoh, a living embodiment of the gods and cosmic order, was somewhat harder to justify; an emperor rarely visited the province more than once in their lifetime, a sharp contrast to previous pharaohs who had spent a majority of their lives in Egypt. Even then, Egypt was hugely important to the empire as it was highly fertile and the richest region of the Mediterranean. Egypt was governed differently from other provinces, emperors treating it more like a personal possession than a province; hand-picking governors and administering it without the Roman Senate's interference; senators were rarely made governors of Egypt and they were even typically barred from visiting the province without explicit permission.

Vespasian (r. 69–79) was the first emperor since Augustus to visit Egypt. At Alexandria he was hailed as pharaoh; recalling the welcome of Alexander the Great at the Oracle of Zeus-Ammon of the Siwa Oasis, Vespasian was proclaimed the son of the creator-deity Amun (Zeus-Ammon), in the style of the ancient pharaohs, and an incarnation of Serapis in the manner of the Ptolemies. As pharaonic precedent demanded, Vespasian demonstrated his divine election by the traditional methods of spitting on and trampling a blind and crippled man, thereby miraculously healing him.

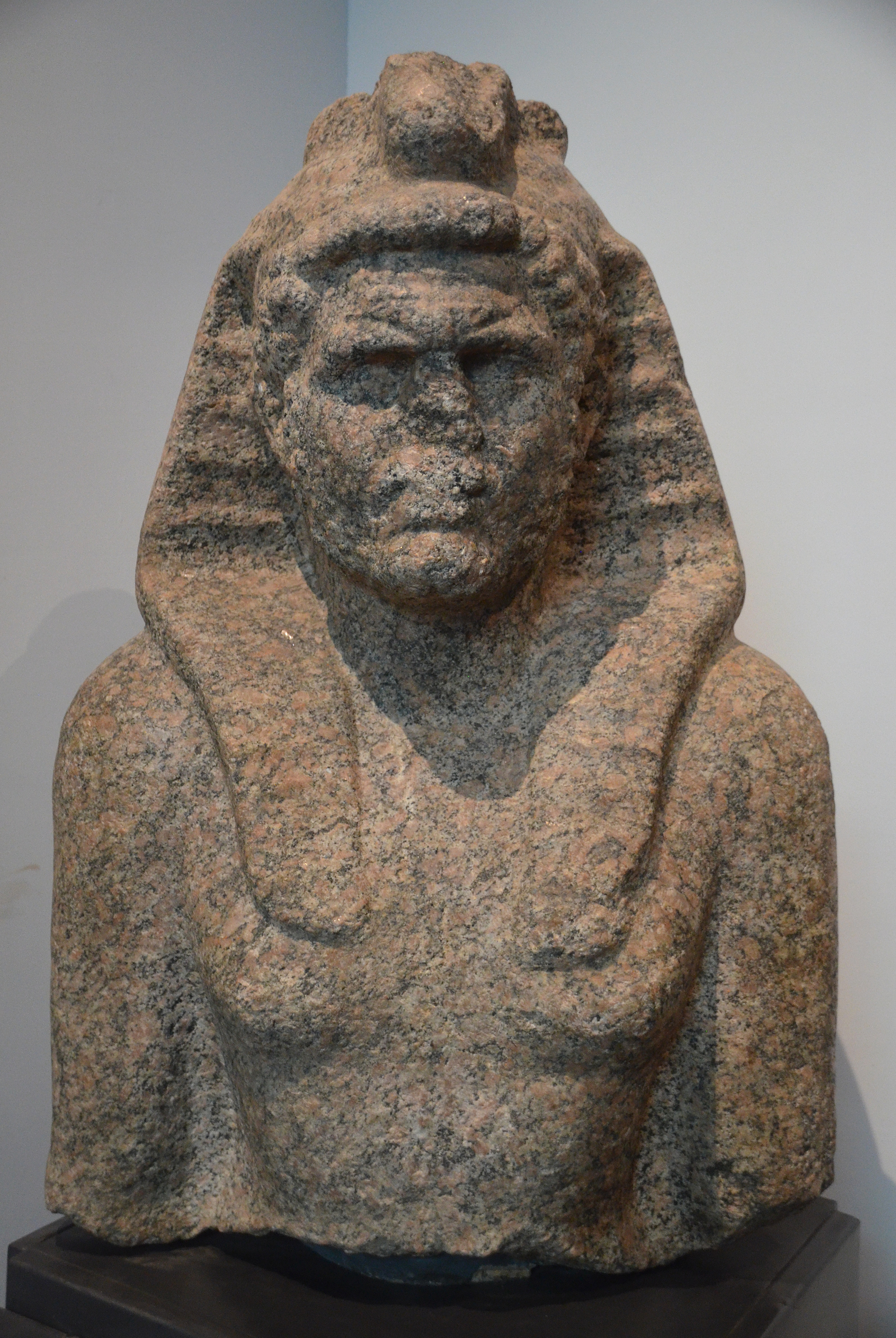
Statue of Caracalla (r. 211–217) as a pharaoh, Alexandria National Museum, Alexandria

To the Egyptians, their religion demanded that there was a pharaoh to act as the intermediary between the gods and humanity. As such, the emperors continued to be regarded as pharaohs since this proved the most simple solution, disregarding the actual political situation, similar to how Egypt had regarded the Persians or Greeks before the Romans. The abstract nature of the role of these "Roman pharaohs" ensured that the priests of Egypt could demonstrate their loyalty both to their traditional ways and to the new foreign ruler. The Roman emperors themselves mostly ignored the status accorded to them by the Egyptians; in Latin and Greek their titles continued to be Roman only (Imperator in Latin and Autokrator in Greek) and their role as god-kings was only ever acknowledged domestically by the Egyptians themselves. Not all Egyptians were positively inclined towards the Roman emperors; there were a handful of Egyptian revolts against Roman rulers and there are surviving examples of texts by Egyptian priests lamenting Roman rule of Egypt and calling for the reinstatement of a native dynasty of pharaohs.

As Christianity became more and more accepted within the empire, eventually becoming the state religion, emperors no longer found it possible to accept the traditional implications of being pharaoh (a position firmly rooted in the Egyptian religion) and by the early 4th century, Alexandria itself, the capital of Egypt since the time of Alexander the Great, had become a major center of Christianity. By this point, the view of the Romans as pharaohs had already declined somewhat; Egypt being on the periphery of the Roman Empire was much different from the traditional pharaonic view of Egypt as the center of the world. This was evident in the imperial pharaonic titulatures; though early emperors had been given elaborate titulatures similar to those of the Ptolemies and native pharaohs before them, no emperor after Marcus Aurelius (r. 161–180) is attested by more than a nomen (though still written in royal cartouches). Although there continued to be Roman emperors for centuries, until the Fall of Constantinople in 1453 AD, and Egypt continued to be a part of the empire until 641 AD, the last Roman emperor to be conferred the title of pharaoh was Maximinus Daza (reigned 311–313 AD).

Despite actual dynastic relationships (there were at least four distinct dynasties of Roman emperors between Augustus and Maximinus Daza), the period of Roman rule over Egypt in its entirety is sometimes referred to as the Thirty-fourth Dynasty. Some nineteenth century Egyptian scholars, such as Mikhail Sharubim and Rifa'a al-Tahtawi, split the Roman emperors into two dynasties, a Thirty-fourth Dynasty for pagan emperors and a Thirty-fifth Dynasty encompassing Christian emperors from Theodosius I to the Muslim conquest of Egypt in 641 AD, although no Christian Roman emperor was ever referred to as pharaoh by the population of ancient Egypt.

== Impact on Egyptology ==
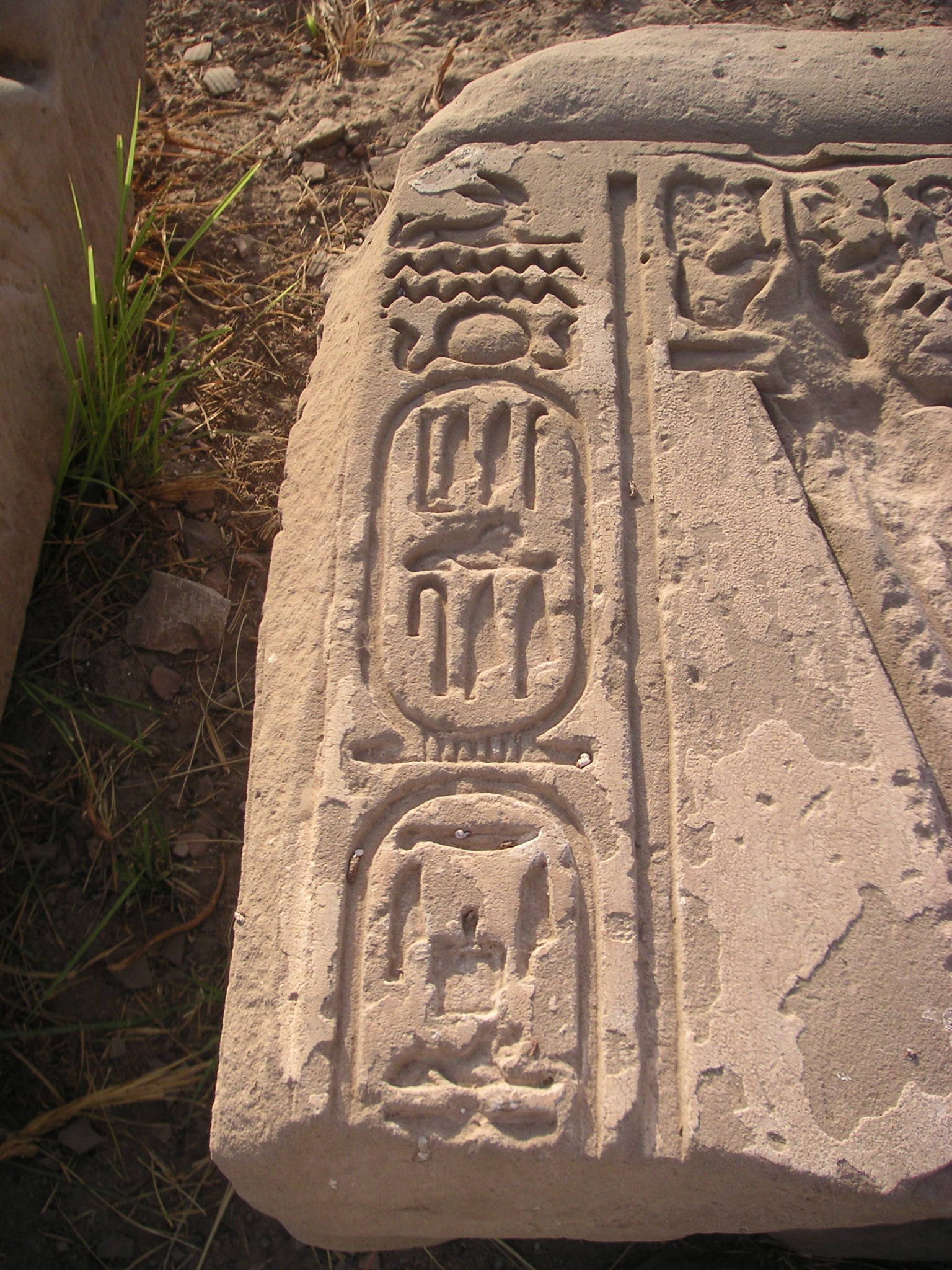
Cartouches of Tiberius (r. 14–37)

The pharaonic titularies of the Roman emperors played a highly important role in modern Egyptology. A central figure in the decipherment of ancient Egyptian hieroglyphics was the French orientalist Jean-François Champollion (1790–1832). Champollion's 1822 Lettre à M. Dacier is the most famous publication in all of Egyptology and is sometimes considered the beginning of the discipline itself. The letter included Champollion's proposed readings of pharaonic cartouches from the Ptolemaic and Roman periods, based on previous attempts and comparisons between different cartouches. The decipherment of names of emperors, and in particular the Egyptian renditions of titles like Caesar and autokrator, were a highly important part of the process.

Though there would be further developments before full-length hieroglyphic texts could be read with reasonable accuracy, Champollion's discoveries in phonetic hieroglyphics were highly impactful. By the time of the publication of the letter, which included a list of identified phonetic hieroglyphic signs, Champollion did not expect that the phonetic values he discovered could be applied to names of pre-Ptolemaic pharaohs as well. His subsequent realization, at some point later in 1822 or in 1823, that hieroglyphic writing was often a combination of phonetic and ideographic (i.e. symbols of words or ideas) laid the groundwork for future successful decipherment efforts and led Champollion to begin focusing on not only deciphering the symbols but also to translate the underlying language.

== List of emperor-pharaohs ==
This list only contains emperors who are attested in hieroglyphics (i.e. with pharaonic titles), per von Beckerath (1984).

Depiction	Name & reign	Pharaonic titles (cartouches) (Note: The titles and names follow von Beckerath (1984): hieroglyphics pp. 296–306 and transliterations pp. 123–127. The names of emperors were written in hieroglyphics phonetically, based on their names in Greek. Because the spellings were phonetic, numerous emperors are known by multiple different renditions of their names and titles. Different renditions are included here only if they actually differ in meaning.)				Notes	Ref
	Augustus r. 30 BC (Note: Augustus did not become Roman emperor until 27 BC, but was recognized as Pharaoh in Egypt after the end of Caesarion's reign, presumably from 30 BC onwards.) – AD 14	Horus name: ṯmꜢ-Ꜥ wr-pḥtj ḥwnw-bnr-mrwt ḥqꜢ-ḥqꜢw stp-n-Ptḥ-Nnw-jt-nṯrw; The sturdy-armed one with great strength, the youth sweet of love, ruler of rulers, chosen of Ptah and Nun, the father of the gods ṯmꜢ-Ꜥ wr-pḥtj ḥwnw-bnr-mrwt The sturdy-armed one with great strength, the youth sweet of love		Prenomen: ḥqꜢ-ḥqꜢw stp-n-Ptḥ; Ruler of rulers, chosen by Ptah ḥqꜢ-ḥqꜢw stp-n-Ptḥ mrj-Ꜣst; Ruler of rulers, chosen by Ptah, beloved of Isis Autokrator	Nomen: Kaisaros, Ep. nt.f mḥ (Note: This epithet is perhaps transliteratable to "Autokrator".) Kaisaros, Ep. pꜢ nṯr Kaisaros, Ep. Ꜥnḫ-ḏt mrj-Ptḥ-Ꜣst Romaios	First Roman emperor and the first Roman ruler to control Egypt. Instituted new unpopular taxation systems in Egypt and banned Egyptian cults in Rome itself.	
	Tiberius r. 14–37	Horus name: ṯmꜢ-Ꜥ wr-pḥtj ḥwnw-bnr-mrwt ḥqꜢ-ḥqꜢw stp-n-Ptḥ-Nnw-jt-nṯrw; The sturdy-armed one with great strength, the perfect and popular youth, ruler of rulers, chosen of Ptah and Nun, the father of the gods ṯmꜢ-Ꜥ wr-pḥtj ḥwnw-bnr-mrwt kꜢ-nsw sḫm-ḫntj-pr-dwꜢt; The sturdy-armed one with great strength, the perfect and popular youth, ruler of rulers, royal ka of power, Foremost of the House of the Duat ṯmꜢ-Ꜥ ẖwj-ḫꜢswt wr-pḫtj nḫhw-BꜢqt; The uniter and subduer of the Foreign Lands, Great strength, Victorious one of Baqet ṯmꜢ-Ꜥ ẖnmw-n-tꜢw smꜢw-wꜢs-?-gmj-wš-m-Jtrtj; He who unites the two lands on behalf of Khnum, the scribe who finds strength in the two rivers			Nomen: Tiberios Tiberios ntj-ḫw (Note: The frequently used "ntj-ḫw" is the Egyptian version of the Greek honorific sebastos (the Greek rendition of the style Augustus).) Tiberios Kaisaros, Ep. Ꜥnḫ-ḏt; Tiberios Kaisaros, living forever	Left little impression on Egypt	
	Caligula r. 37–41	Horus name: kꜢ-nḫt jꜢḫ-stwt-RꜤ-JꜤḥ; The strong bull, he of the lights of Ra and the rays of Sokar		Prenomen: Autokrator, Ep. ḥqꜢ-ḥqꜢw mrj-Ptḥ-Ꜣst; Autokrator, beloved by Ptah and Isis	Nomen: Kaisaros Germanikos, Ep. Ꜥnḫ-ḏt; Kaisaros Germanikos, living forever	Left little impression on Egypt; lifted the ban on Egyptian cults in Rome instituted by Augustus	
	Claudius r. 41–54	Horus name: kꜢ-nḫt ḏd-jꜢḫ-Šw-(m)-Ꜣḫt; The strong bull of the stable moon on the horizon kꜢ-nḫt wḥm-ḫꜤw; The strong bull of the golden offspring		Prenomen: Autokrator, Ep. ḥqꜢ-ḥqꜢw mrj-Ꜣst-Ptḥ; Autokrator, beloved by Ptah and Isis Kaisaros Germanikos Kaisaros Sebastos Germanikos Autokrator	Nomen: Tiberios Klaudios Tiberios Klaudios Kaisaros ntj ḫw	Left little impression on Egypt; rebuked requests from Alexandria to gain its own self-governing senate	
	Nero r. 54–68	Horus name: ṯmꜢ-Ꜥ ẖwj-ḫꜢswt wr-nḫw-BꜢqt ḥqꜢ-ḥqꜢw stp-n-Nnw-Mrwr; The sturdy-armed one who struck the foreign lands, victorious for Egypt, ruler or rulers, chosen of Nun who loves him ṯmꜢ-Ꜥ ẖwj-ḫꜢswt; The sturdy-armed one who struck the foreign lands		Prenomen: ḥqꜢ-ḥqꜢw stp-n-Ptḥ mrj-Ꜣst; Autokrator, chosen by Ptah, beloved of Isis Kaisaros Germanikos	Nomen: Neron Neron Klaudios, Ep. ḫw Autokrator Neron Neron Klaudios Kaisaros ntj ḫw	Sent a small group of praetorian guards to explore along the Nile river south of Egypt, perhaps intended as a scouting mission for a later conquests in the region	
	Galba r. 68–69	Nomen: Serouios Galbas Autokrator				Left little impression on Egypt	
	Otho r. 69	Nomen: Markos Othon				Left little impression on Egypt	
There are no known traces of the brief reign of Vitellius (r. 69) in Egypt.
	Vespasian r. 69–79	Nomen: Ouespasianos Ouespasianos ntj ḫw				First emperor to visit Egypt since Augustus; received a traditional pharaonic coronation	
	Titus r. 79–81	Horus name: ḥwnw-nfr bnr-mrwt The perfect and popular youth		Prenomen: Titos Autokrator Titos Kaisaros	Nomen: Ouespasianos	Left little impression on Egypt	
	Domitian r. 81–96	Horus name: ḥwnw-nḫt jṯj-m-sḫm.f. The mighty youth, his power will become stronger	Golden Horus name: wsr-rnpwt ꜤꜢ-nḫtw; Rich in years and great of victories	Prenomen: Ḥr-zꜢ-Ꜣst mrj-nṯrw-nb(w); Horus, son of Isis, beloved of the gods	Nomen: Domitianos Domitianos ntj ḫw Domitianos Sebastos Kaisaros	Introduced Egyptian deities on coins minted in Alexandria and founded temples dedicated to deities such as Isis and Serapis in Italy. Using the trappings of being pharaoh, he also sought to add further legitimacy to imperial rule.	
	Nerva r. 96–98	Nomen: Nerouas ntj ḫw				Left little impression on Egypt	
	Trajan r. 98–117	Prenomen: Autokrator Kaisaros Nerouas Germanikos Dakikos, Ep. Ꜥnḫ-ḏt		Nomen: Nerouas Traianos Nerouas Traianos, Ep. Ꜥnḫ-ḏt mrj-Ꜣst Traianos ntj ḫw Traianos ntj ḫw + Aristos Germanikos Dakikos		Egyptian sources from Trajan's time associate empress Pompeia Plotina with the goddess Hathor, the first known direct association between the imperial family (other than the emperor) and Egyptian deities	
	Hadrian r. 117–138	Nomen: Traianos Adrianos, Ep. Ꜥnḫ-ḏt mrj-Ꜣst Adrianos ntj ḫw Hadrianus Caesar				Paid a 8/10-month long state visit to Egypt in 130–131, visiting many sites of note and founding Antinoöpolis. Hadrian's cult of Antinous was influenced by Egyptian theology. Ruled during a period of Roman Egyptomania.	
	Antoninus Pius r. 138–161	Horus name: nfr-n(?)-tꜢ-nṯr ḥn-n-f-ŠmꜤw-Mḥw-m-nḏm-jb; The perfect one of the gods, who rejoices with the two lands, in sweetness of heart		Prenomen: Autokrator Kaisaros Titos Ailios Adrianos	Nomen: Antoninos ntj ḫw + Eusebes Antoninos Sebastos Eusebes ntj ḫw Antoninos ntj ḫw Ꜥnḫ-ḏt Antoninos ntj ḫw, Ep. šꜢj-n-BꜢqt	Celebrated in Ancient Egypt due to overseeing the completion of a Sothic cycle in 139. His long reign saw the last significant temple constructions in Egypt. Visited Alexandria in the 150s to sponsor various new buildings.	
	Lucius Verus r. 161–169	Loukio(s) Aurelio(s), Ep. wr-ꜤꜢ Ꜥnḫ-ḏt (Note: From this point onwards, von Beckerath (1984) ceases to use the traditional Egyptian divisions of the royal name; all names from this point on are just nomina (personal names).)				Joint emperor with Marcus Aurelius	
	Marcus Aurelius r. 161–180	Aurelios Antoninos ntj ḫw Autokrator Kaisaros Mark(os) Aurelio(s) Antonin(os) Aure(li)os, Ep. Ꜥnḫ-ḏt + Antonin(os), Ep. Ꜥnḫ-ḏt [Markos] Aurelio(s) Antoninos Sebastos				Faced with a native Egyptian revolt led by Isidorus in 171–175 and the revolt of the Egypt-supported usurper Avidius Cassius 175. Toured Egypt in 176, the province at the time badly affected by the Antonine Plague. The last surviving Demotic papyri and Ostraca date to Aurelius' reign.	
	Commodus r. 180–192	Markos Au(re)lios Komodos Antoninos Komodos Kaisaros(?) Komodos Antoninos ntj ḫw				Last emperor to be widely attested as pharaonic patron in Egyptian temples. Subsequent decline of representations of emperors is probably attributable to decreased resources available to the clergy and temples rather than a change in imperial attitude and policy.	
Neither of the two ephemeral emperors of the Year of the Five Emperors (193) are attested by any pharaonic titles; Pertinax was briefly recognized in Egypt, 22 days before his assassination, and Didius Julianus was not acknowledged in Egypt at all. The usurper Pescennius Niger was the recognized successor of Pertinax in Egypt but no known pharaonic titles of his survive either.
	Septimius Severus r. 193–211	Seouēros ntj ḫw				Toured Egypt together with the imperial family in 199–200. Repaired old buildings and established senates in Alexandria and elsewhere. Religious division and controversy led to the first large-scale persecution of Christians in Egypt in 201.	
	Geta r. 211	Geta(s) ntj ḫw				Briefly joint emperor with Caracalla	
	Caracalla r. 211–217	Antoninos ntj ḫw				Extended Roman citizenship to all inhabitants of the Roman Empire through the 212 Antonine Constitution; his name Aurelius (Note: "Caracalla" was a nickname, the emperor's full name was Marcus Aurelius Antoninus) was then common, particularly in Egypt.	
	Macrinus r. 217–218	Makrino(s) n(tj) ḫw				Broke long-standing convention and sent a prefect and a senator to govern Egypt, though both were deposed and the senator killed after Macrinus's death	
	Diadumenian r. 218	Diadoumenianos				Junior joint emperor with Macrinus	
Elagabalus (r. 218–222), who succeeded Macrinus and Diadumenian, is not mentioned in any surviving Egyptian sources. His successor Severus Alexander (r. 222–235) was recognized in Egypt, but no pharaonic titles survive. The ephemeral emperors Maximinus Thrax (r. 235–238), Gordian I (r. 238), Gordian II (r. 238), Pupienus (r. 238), Balbinus (r. 238) and Gordian III (r. 238–244) did little of consequence in Egypt and are unrecorded in surviving Egyptian documents.
	Philip r. 244–249	Philippos ntj ḫw				Due to decades of mismanagement and civil strife Egypt had fallen into poverty by the time of Philip's reign. Last pharaoh to be commemorated at the great temple at Esna.	
	Decius r. 249–251	Dekios ntj ḫw				Oversaw the Decian persecution of Christians. His reign saw southern Egypt being raided by the Blemmyes, the first time southern Egypt was attacked since the time of Augustus.	
Emperors Trebonianus Gallus (r. 251–253) and Aemilianus (r. 253) were recognized in Egypt, as attested by official documents and coins minted in Alexandria, but neither is attested by any pharaonic titles.
	Valerian r. 253–260	Oualerianos				Demonized by Christians for renewing persecutions, but popular among the Egyptian clergy	
After Valerian, Egypt was controlled by a sequence of usurpers: Macrianus Minor (r. 260–261), Quietus (r. 260–261) and Lucius Mussius Aemilianus (r. 261–262), though none of them are attested with any pharaonic titles. The legitimate emperor Gallienus (r. 262–268) was then recognized, though there are likewise no known pharaonic titles from his reign. Few records survive from Egypt from Gallienus's successors, with little evidence of the reigns of Claudius Gothicus (r. 268–270), Quintillus (r. 270), Aurelian (r. 270–275) and Tacitus (r. 275–276), though they were all presumably recognised. Near the end of 270 and throughout most of 271, Egypt was occupied by Zenobia of the Palmyrene Empire, who declared herself queen of Egypt, although no pharaonic titles survive. In any case, the province was retaken by Aurelian by the end of 271. The brief reign of emperor Florian (r. 276) was explicitly rejected in Egypt, with the Egyptian legions backing Probus instead.
	Probus r. 276–282	Autokrator Probos (?) (Note: The reading of the name in this cartouche, literally prʻbwj, as "Probos" is not fully certain.)				Seized the imperial throne with Egyptian support. Defeated the Blemmyes, who had penetrated as far north as Coptos.	
Emperors Carus (r. 282–283), Carinus (r. 283–285) and Numerian (r. 283–284) are not recorded in surviving Egyptian sources.
	Diocletian r. 284–305	Diokletian(os)				Reforms removed much of Egypt's idiosyncrasy, further integrating Egypt economically and administratively with the other provinces. Lands in southern Egypt were abandoned during a state visit in 298. The Diocletianic Persecution was particularly severe in Egypt.	
	Maximian r. 286–305	Maksimiano(s)				Western Roman emperor, ruling jointly with Diocletian; did not actually control Egypt	
	Galerius r. 305–311	Kaisaros Iouio(s) Maksimio(s)				Persecutions of Christians continued until a deathbed decree of religious toleration by Galerius	
	Maximinus Daza r. 311–313	Kaisaros Oualerios Mak(sim)inos				Last emperor regarded to have been pharaoh by the Egyptians	
The last aggressively Pagan emperor to control Egypt, Maximinus Daza, was the last Roman emperor to be acknowledged in hieroglyphic texts. Although royal cartouches are recorded from later times (the last known cartouche being from the reign of Constantius II in 340), the pagan Egyptians posthumously used cartouches of Diocletian, rather than acknowledging the later Christian emperors.
