= Ka statue =

Ancient Egyptian statue

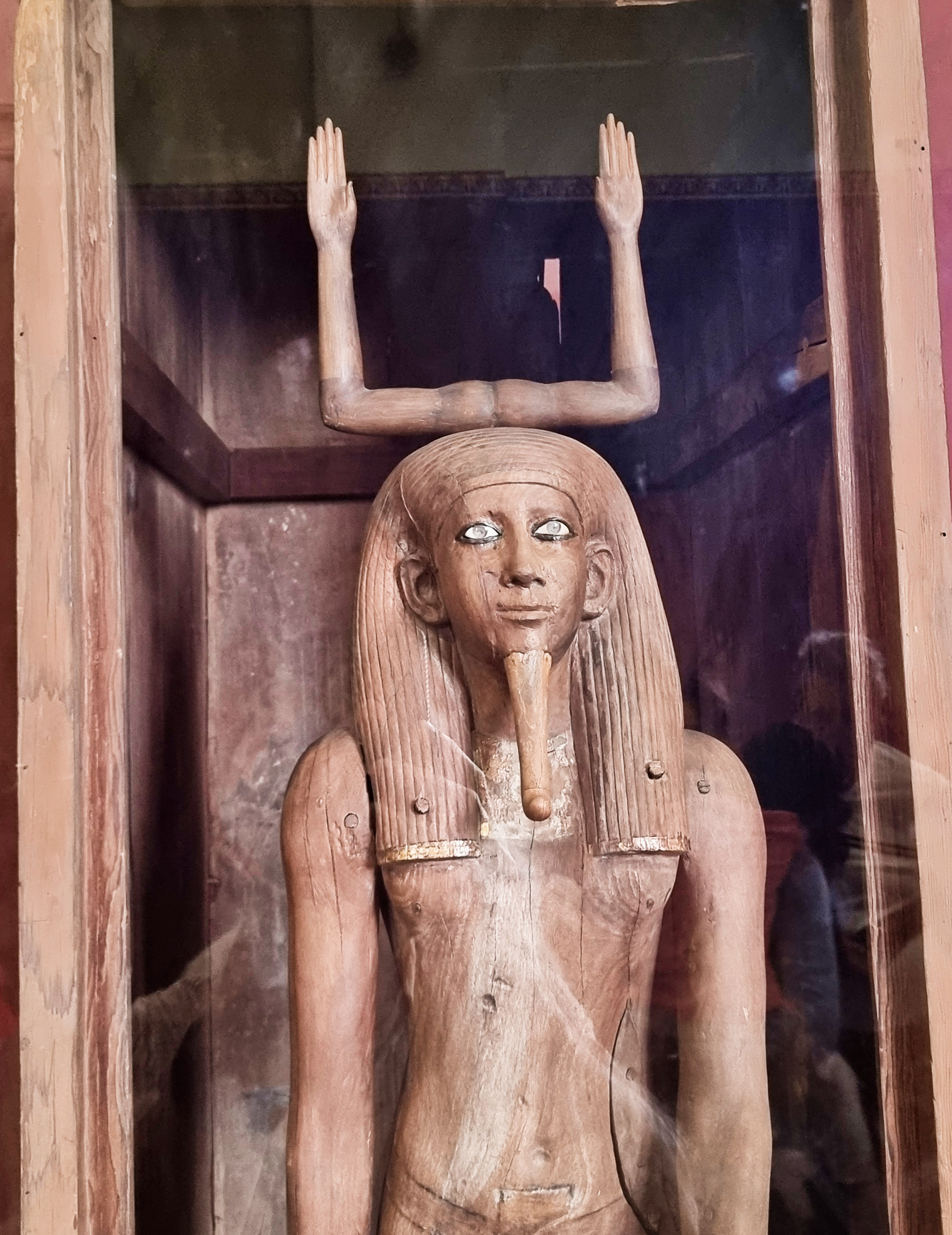
The ka statue, here that of pharaoh Hor, provided a physical place for the ka to manifest.

A ka statue is a type of ancient Egyptian statue intended to provide a resting place for the ka (life-force or spirit) of the person after death. The ancient Egyptians believed the ka, along with the physical body, the name, the ba (personality or soul), and the šwt (shadow), made up the five aspects of a person.

== Purpose and use ==
After death, the ethereal aspects of the soul were believed to be released from the body, free to roam the earth, but required the physical body or a surrogate, such as the ka statue, to return to as a permanent home.

Ka statues could also be set up as a type of memorial for the deceased in absentia; for example in Abydos hundreds were set up to allow the dead to participate in the yearly festivals commemorating the resurrection of Osiris.

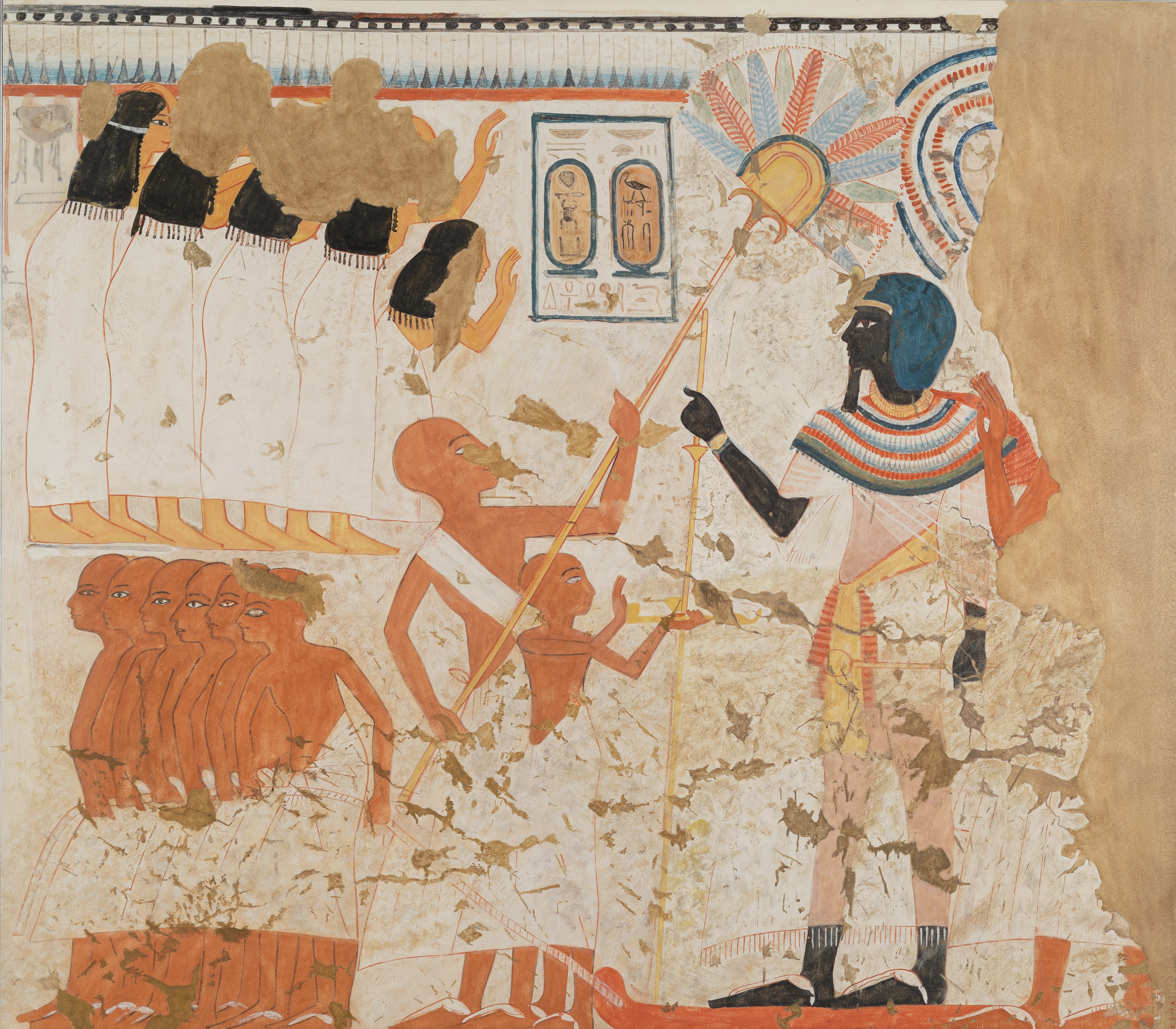
Scene of a ka statue of Thutmose I, being dragged to his tomb; MET Museum, NYC. The statue itself has not survived in Antiquity and is lost.

Because the ancient Egyptians believed statues could magically perceive the world, they were ceremonially brought to life by priests in a special ritual called the opening of the mouth ceremony. In the full version of this ceremony, the mouth, eyes, nose, and ears could be touched with ritual implements to give the statue the power of breath, sight, smell, and hearing.

== Design and construction ==
D28
ka
in hieroglyphs

Ka statues were usually carved from wood or stone and sometimes painted in the likeness of the owner to reinforce the spiritual connection and preserve the person's memory for eternity. Many ka statues were placed in a purpose-built mortuary chapel, or niche, which could be covered with appropriate inscriptions. Like most ancient Egyptian statuary, ka statues display a rigid frontalism in which the body faces squarely forward in a formal way. Whether seated or standing, their posture reflects the need for the statue to "see" the real world in front of them and conform to an ideal standard of beauty and perfection. By the start of the New Kingdom, pharaohs began constructing tombs in the Valley of the Kings, and so they built their mortuary temples separately. As a result, ka statues were relegated to the tombs while mortuary statues (also called cult statues) took their places in the temple.

The hieroglyph representing the ka is a pair of upraised arms. It is sometimes depicted on top of the head of the statue to reinforce its intended purpose.

== Gallery ==
The following images shows the surviving intact Ka statues of pharaohs.

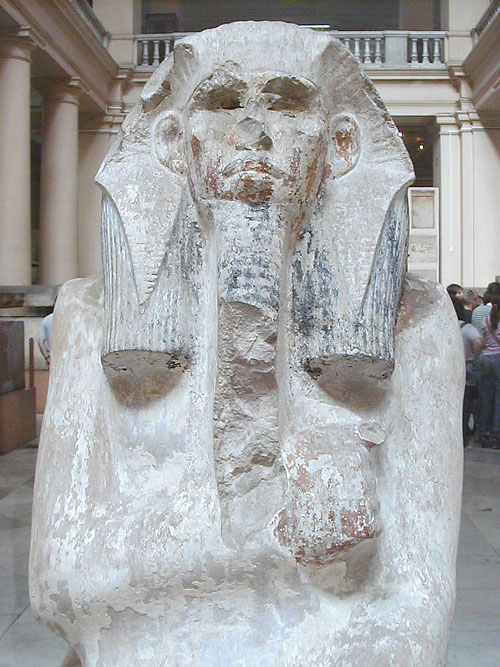
Djoser

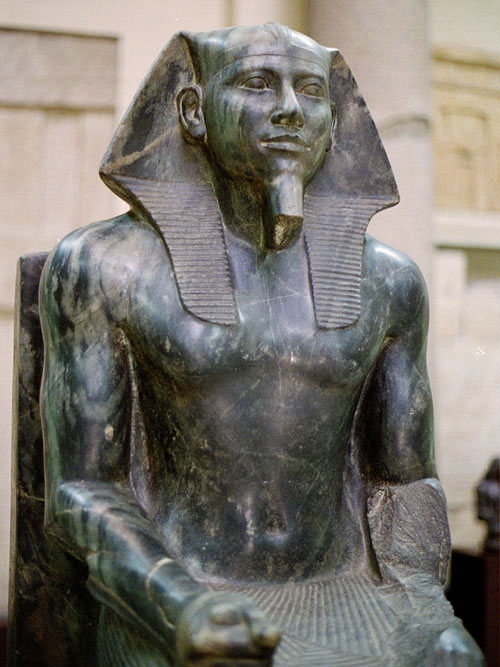
Khafre

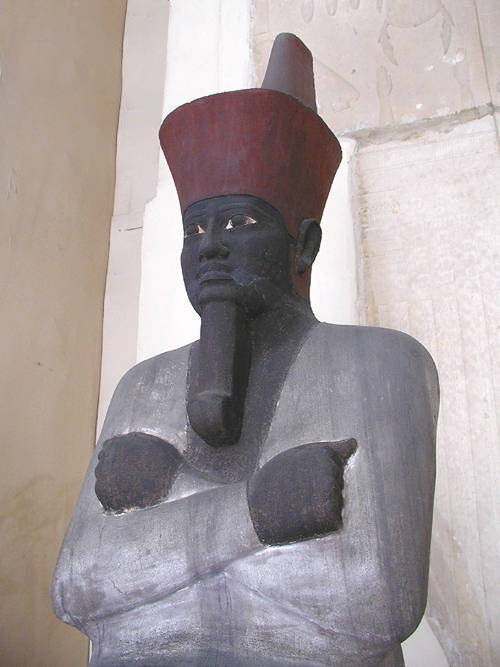
Mentuhotep II

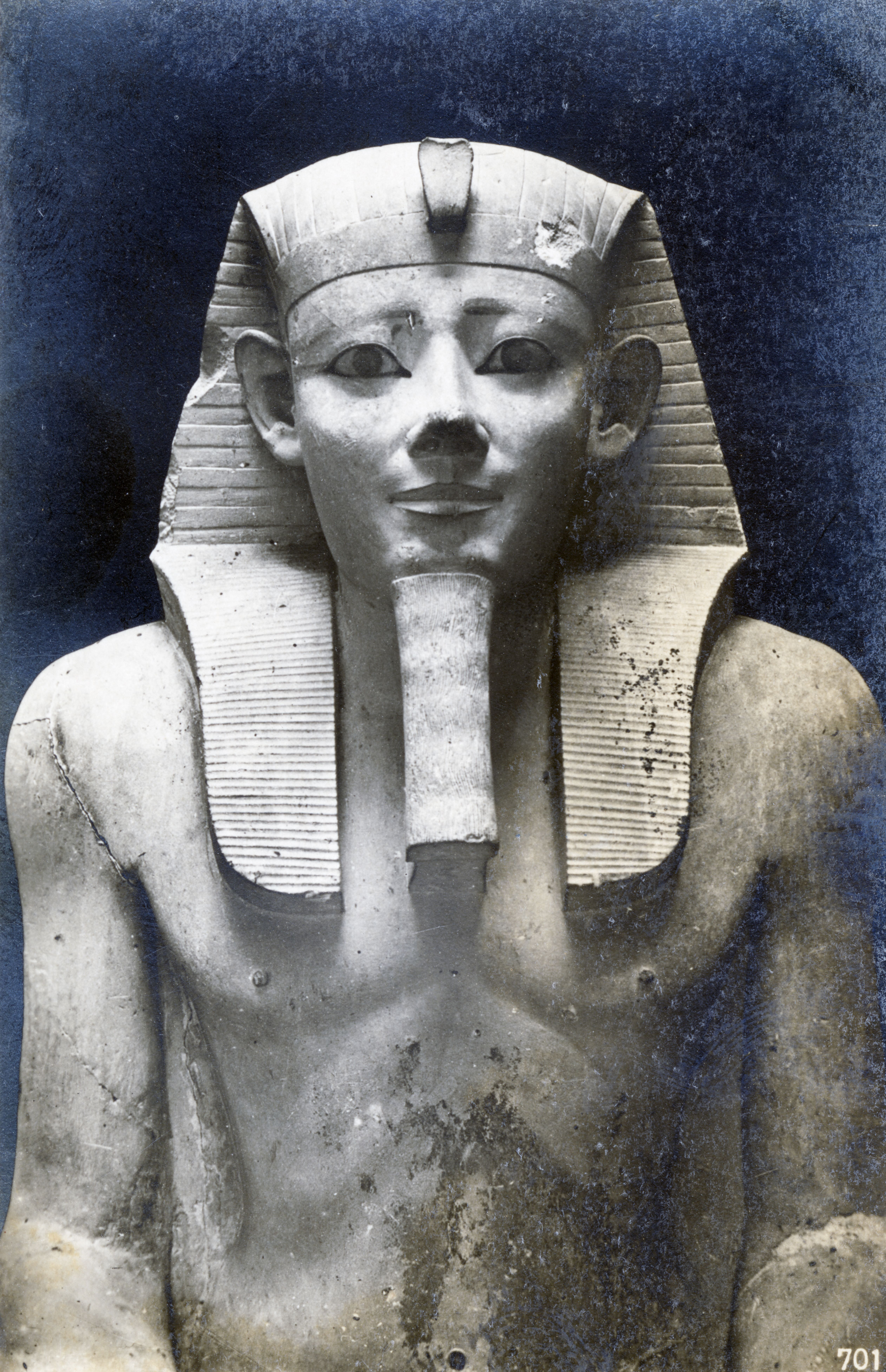
Senusret I

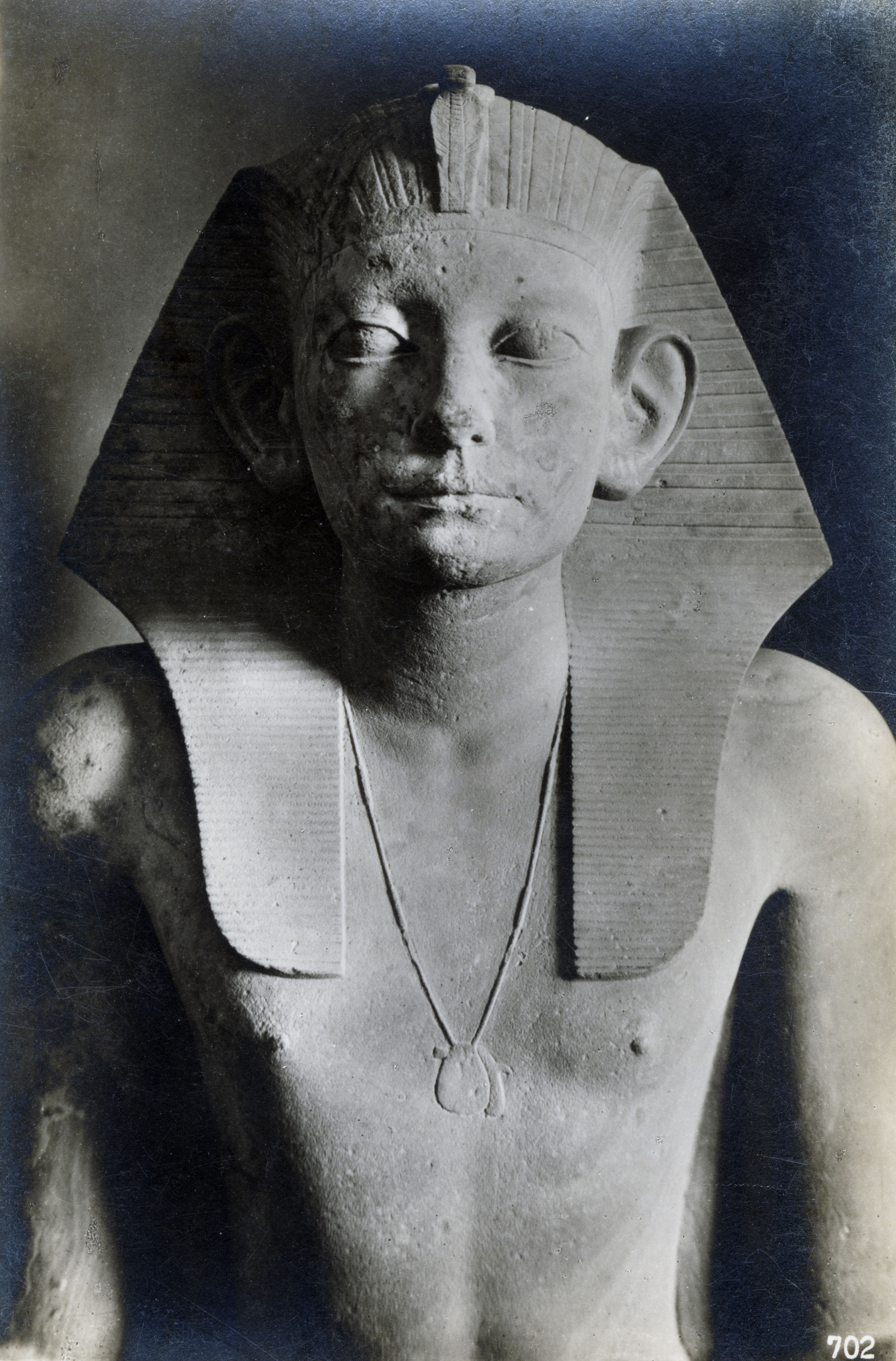
Amenemhat III

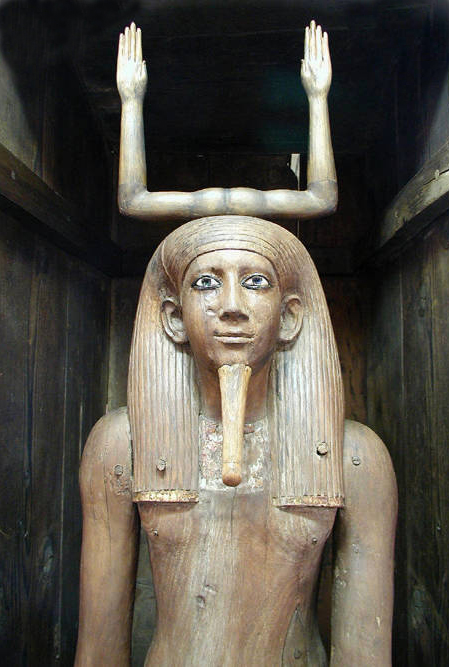
Hor Awibre

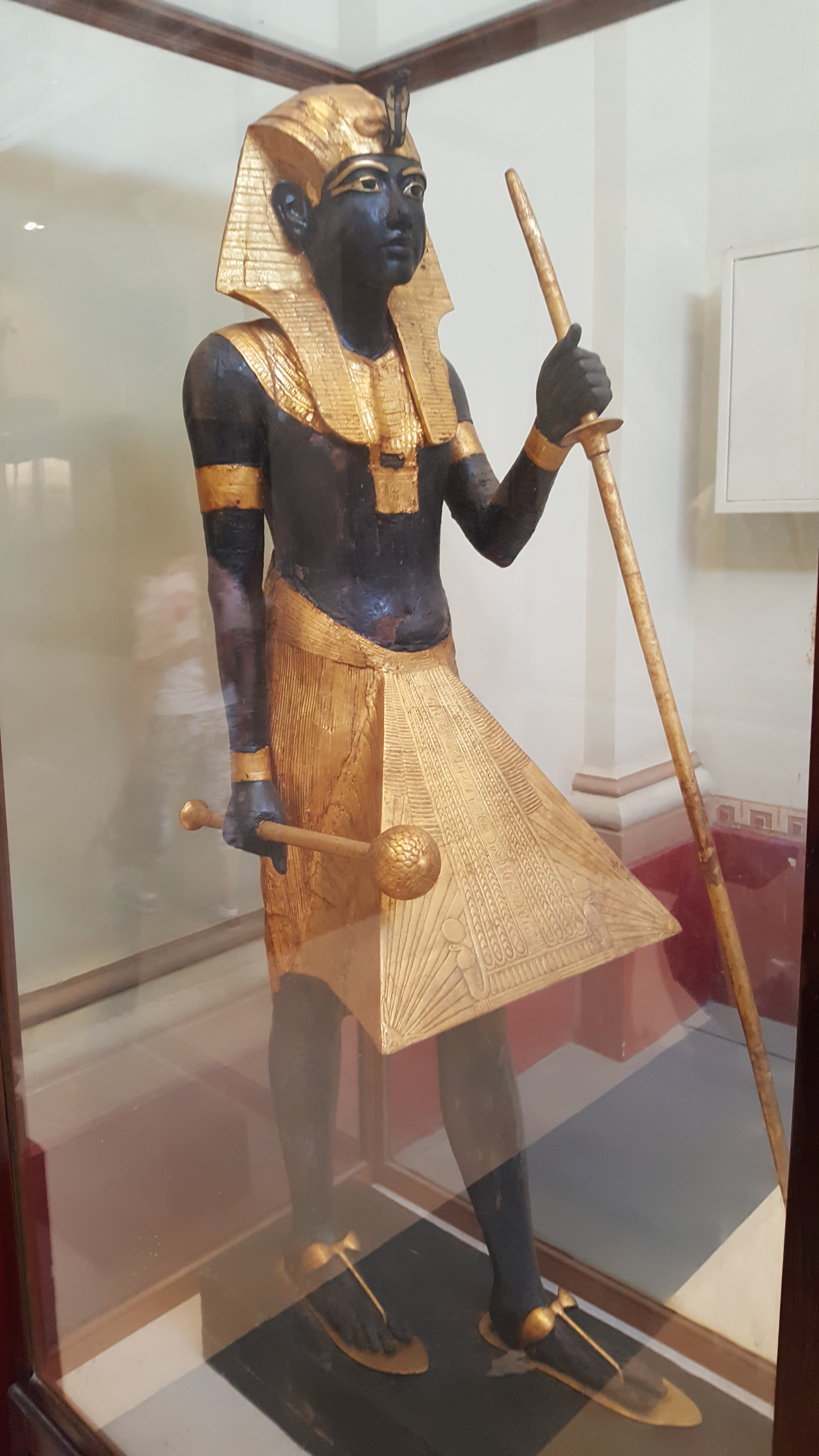
Tutankhamun (with nemes)

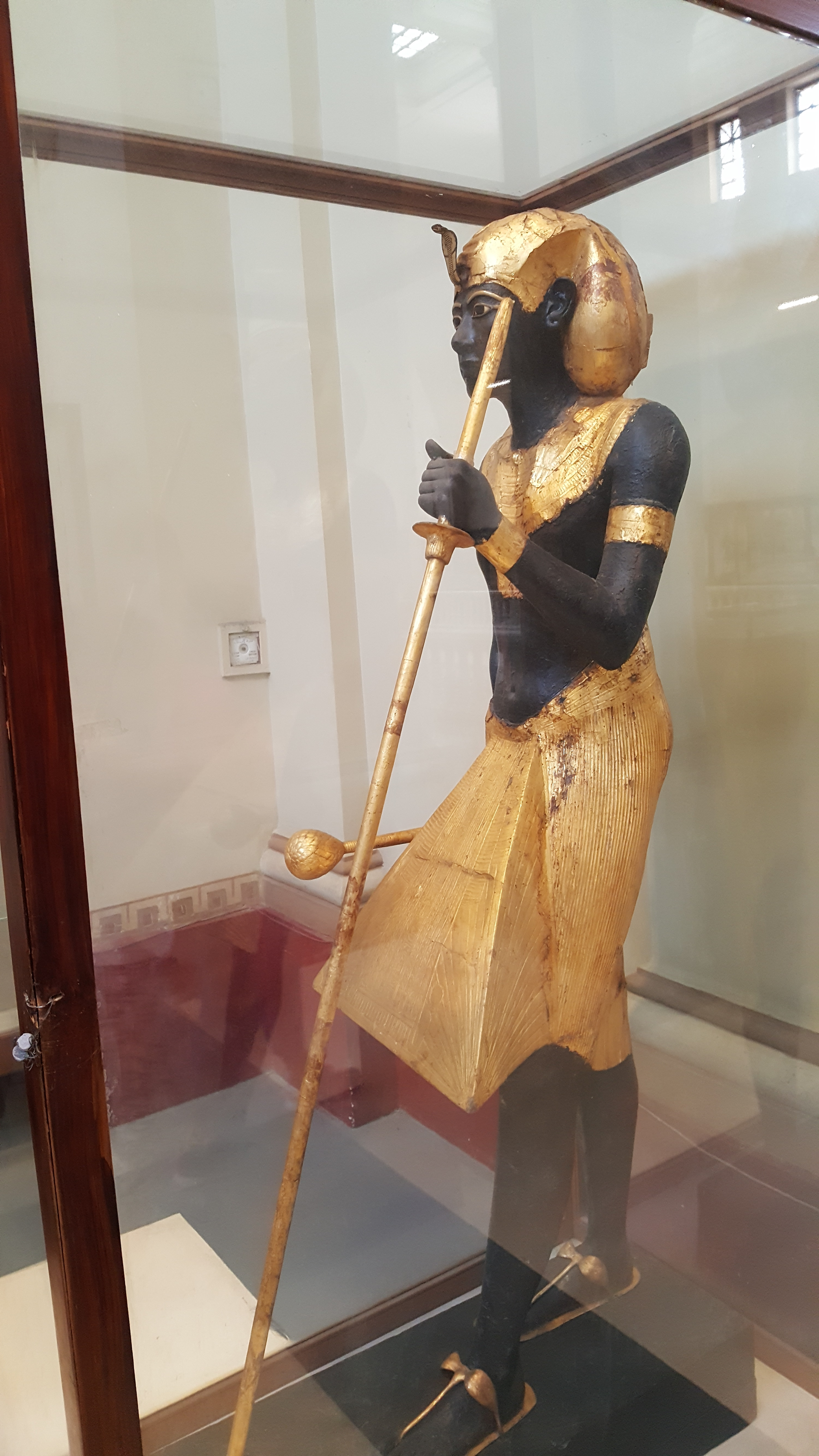
Tutankhamun (with khat)

The following images shows the fragments and reconstructed Ka statues of pharaohs.

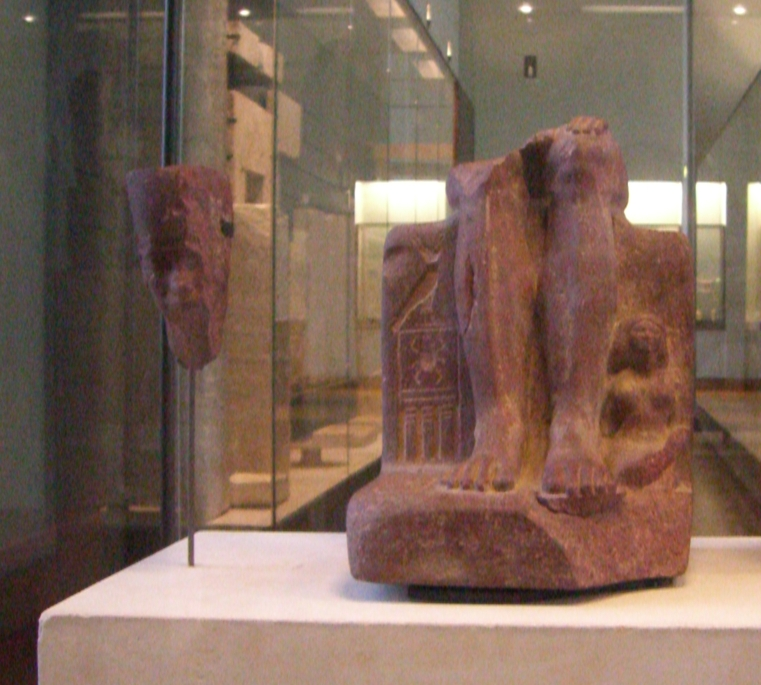
Djedefre

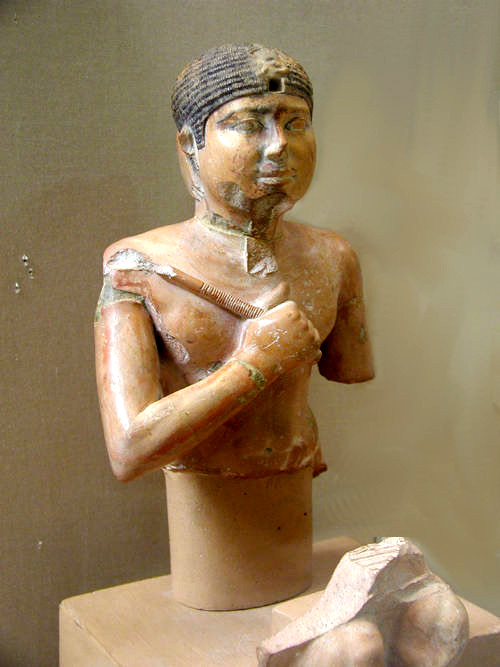
Neferefre

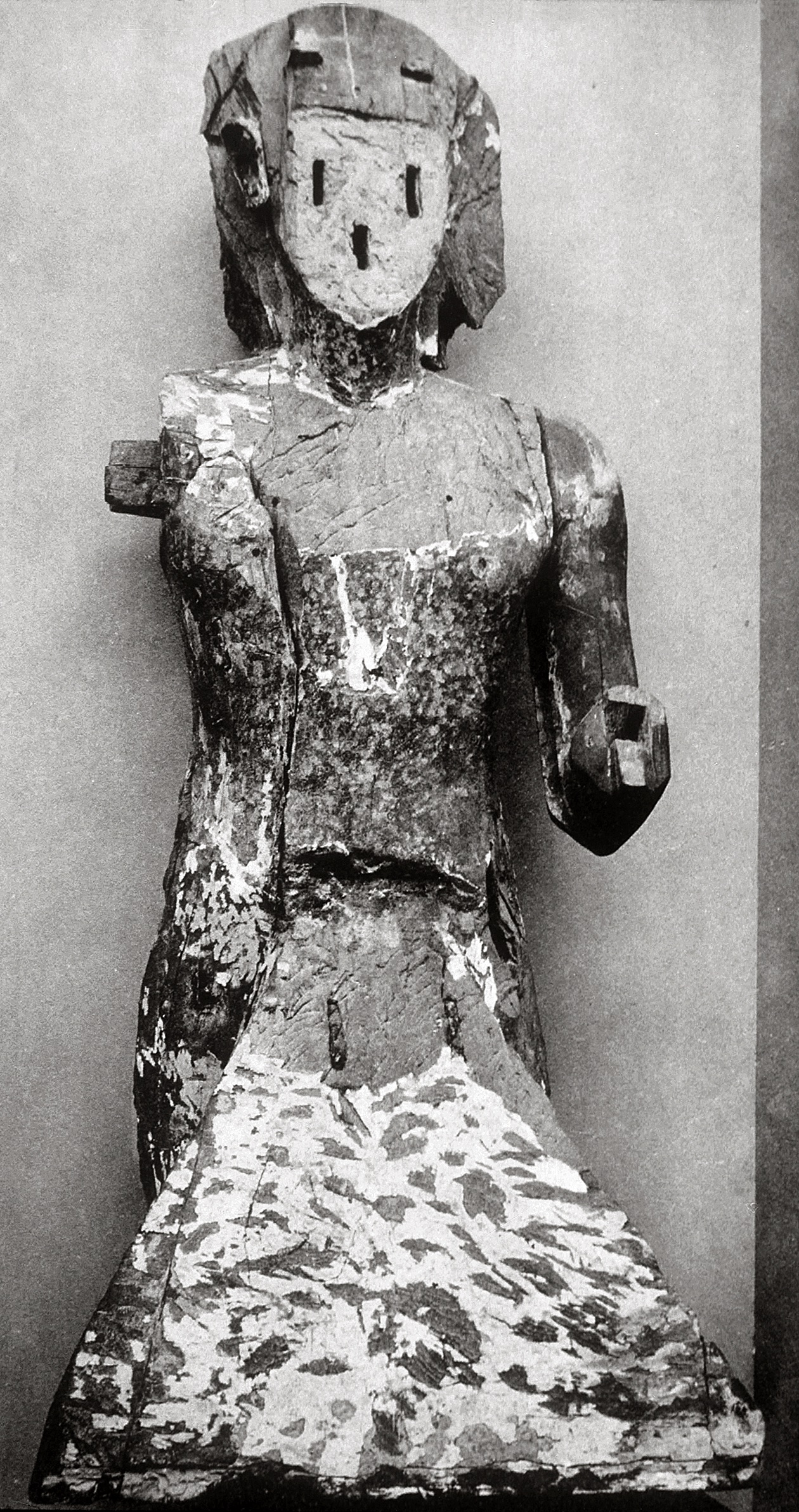
Horemheb

=== Mortuary statues ===
The following images shows the surviving and reconstructed mortuary/cult statues of pharaohs. While not strictly ka statues, the mortuary/cult statues take the place of them in mortuary temples and receive the same offerings and ceremonies as ka statues.

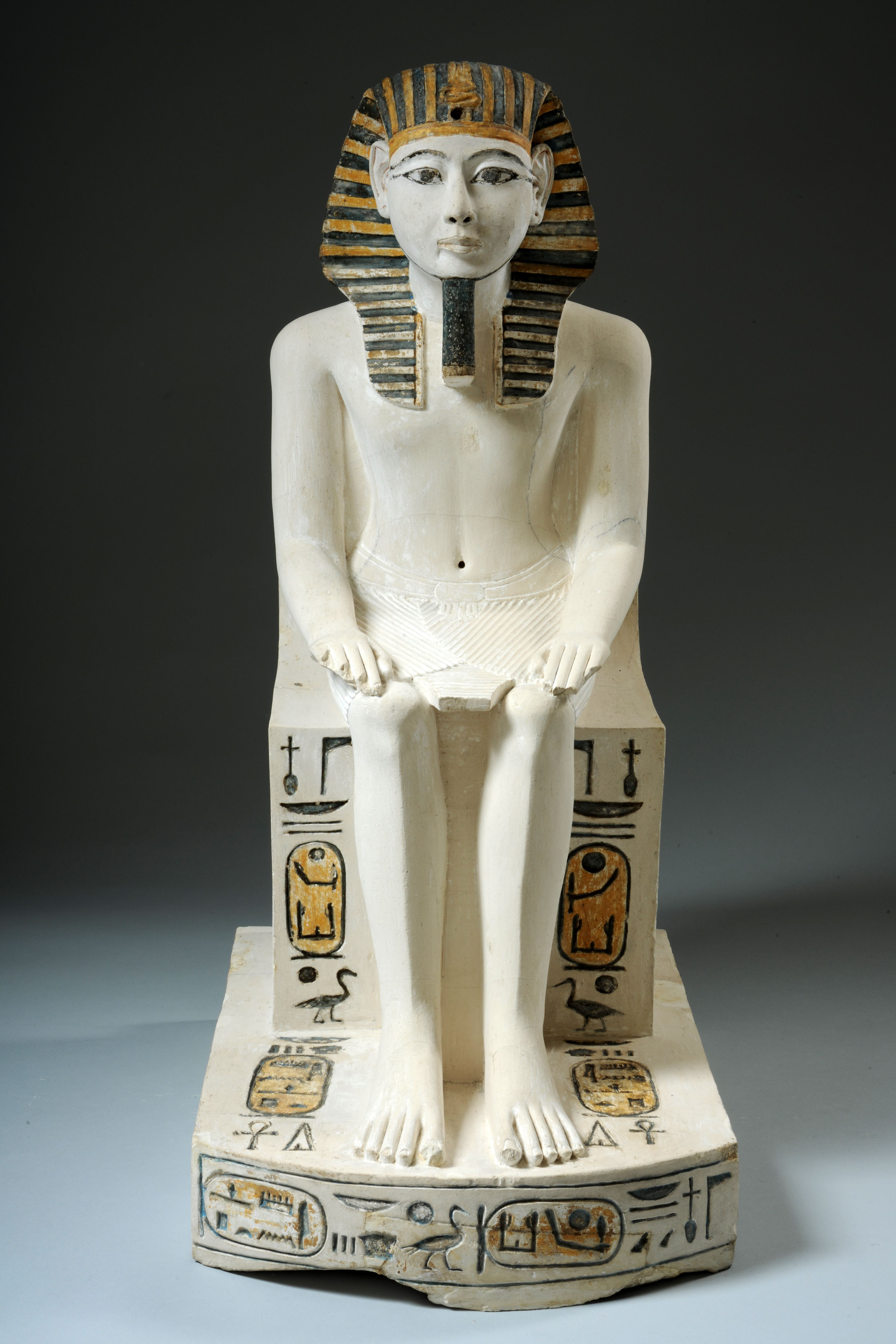
Amenhotep I

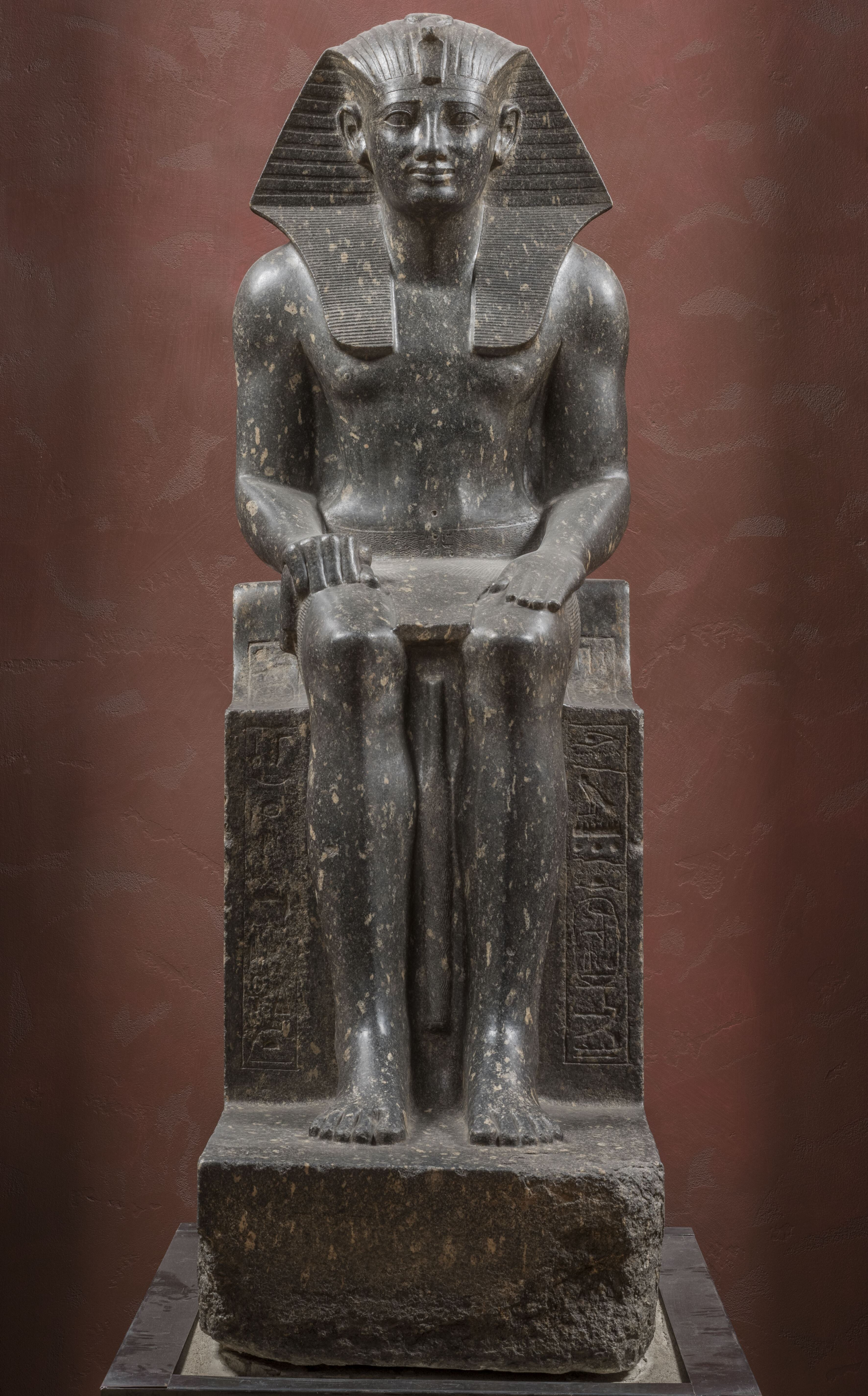
Thutmose I (usurped and recarved from Senusret I)

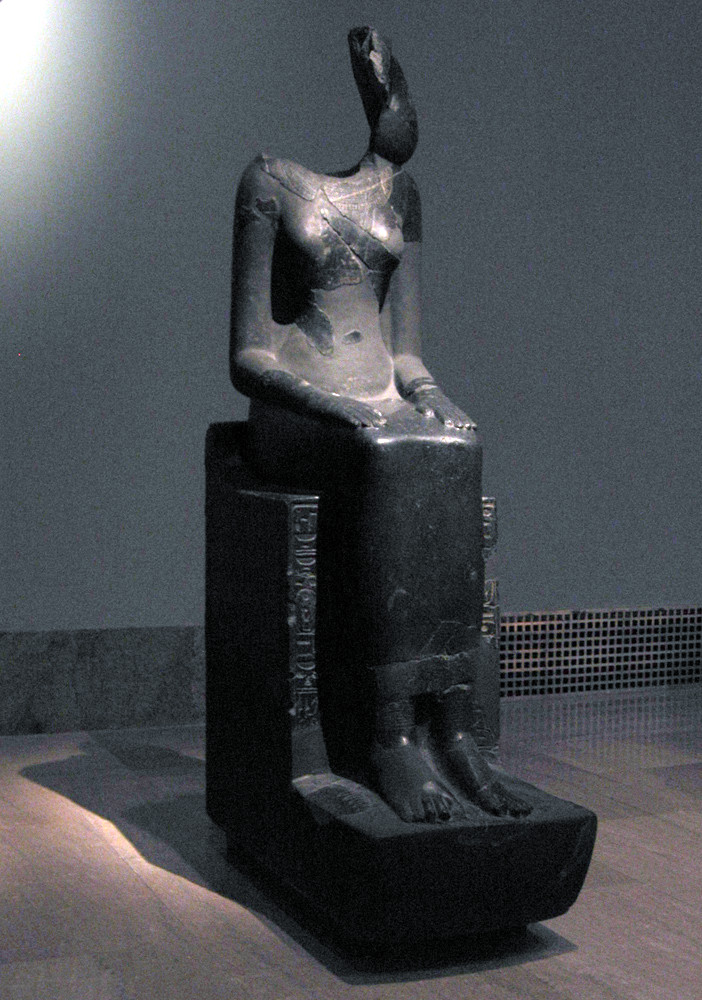
Hatshepsut

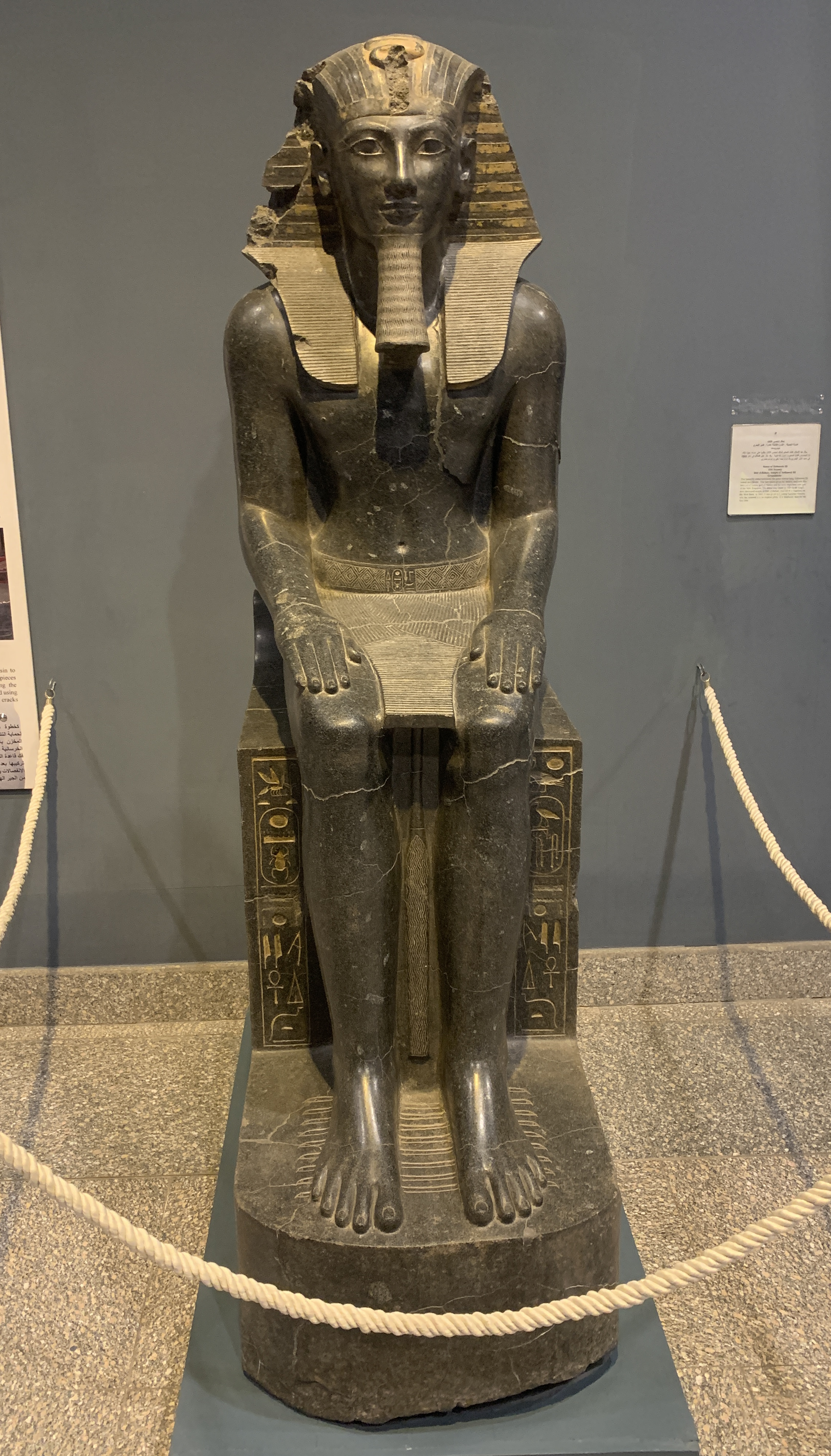
Thutmose III

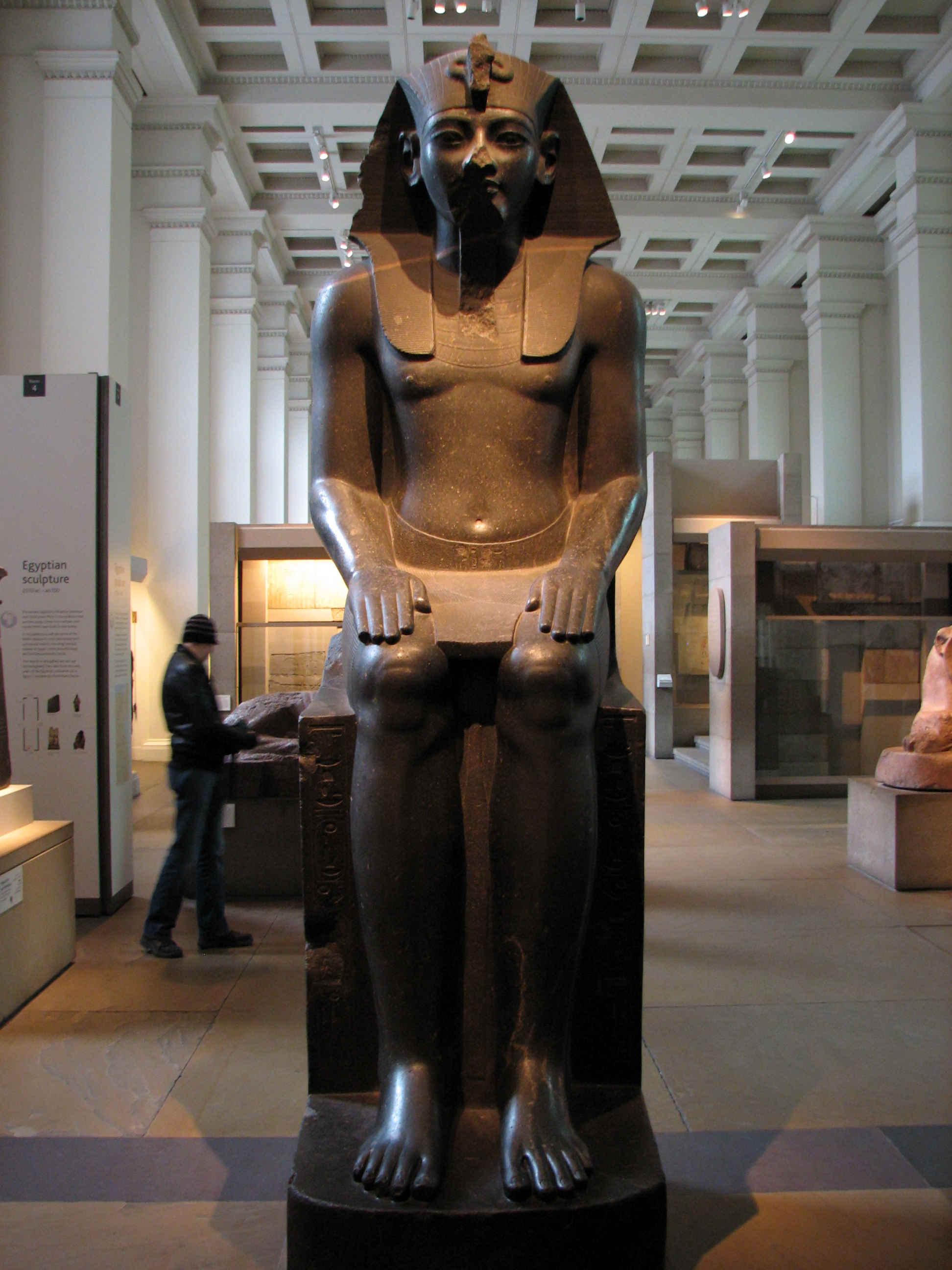
Amenhotep III

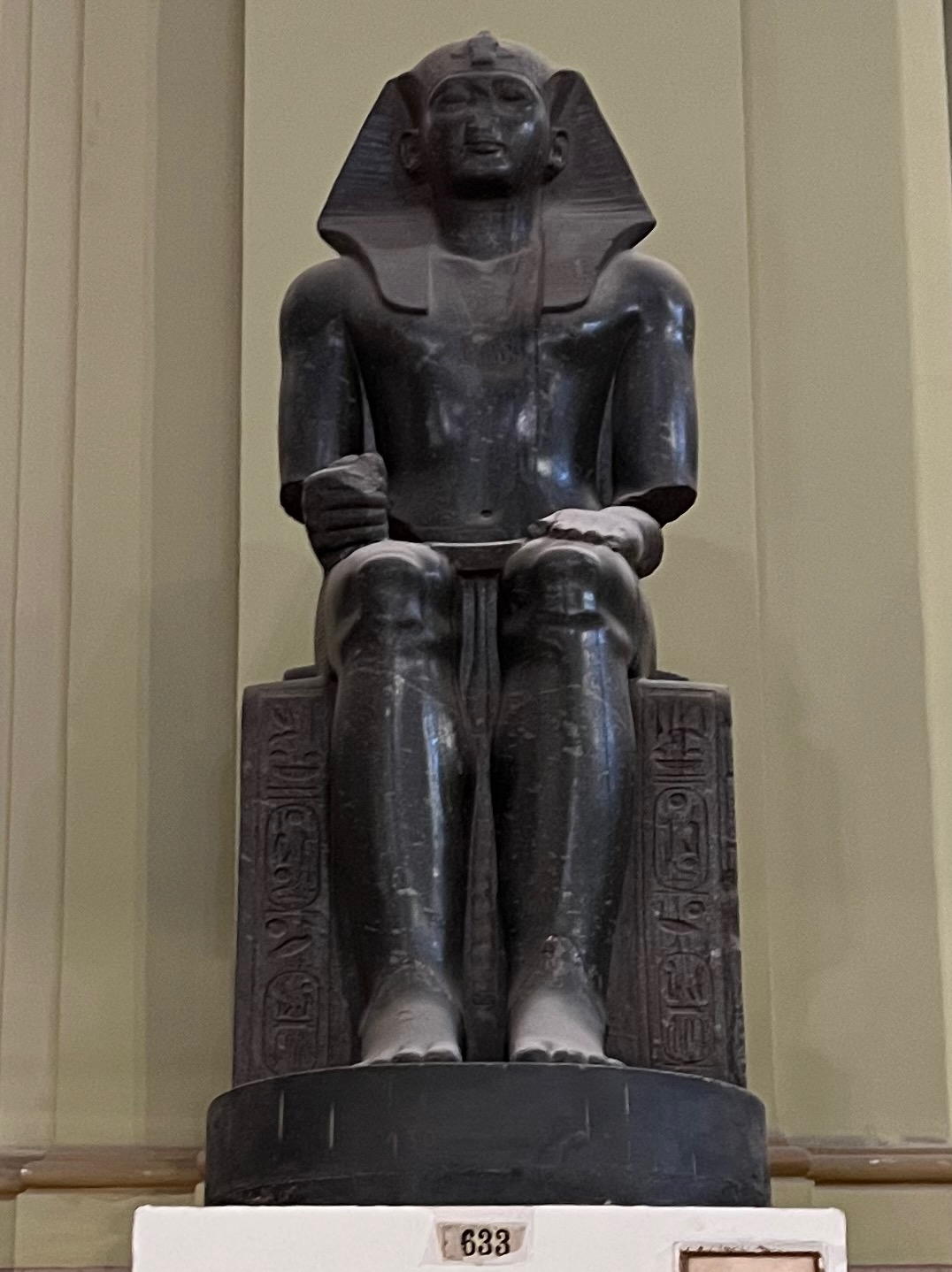
Ramesses II

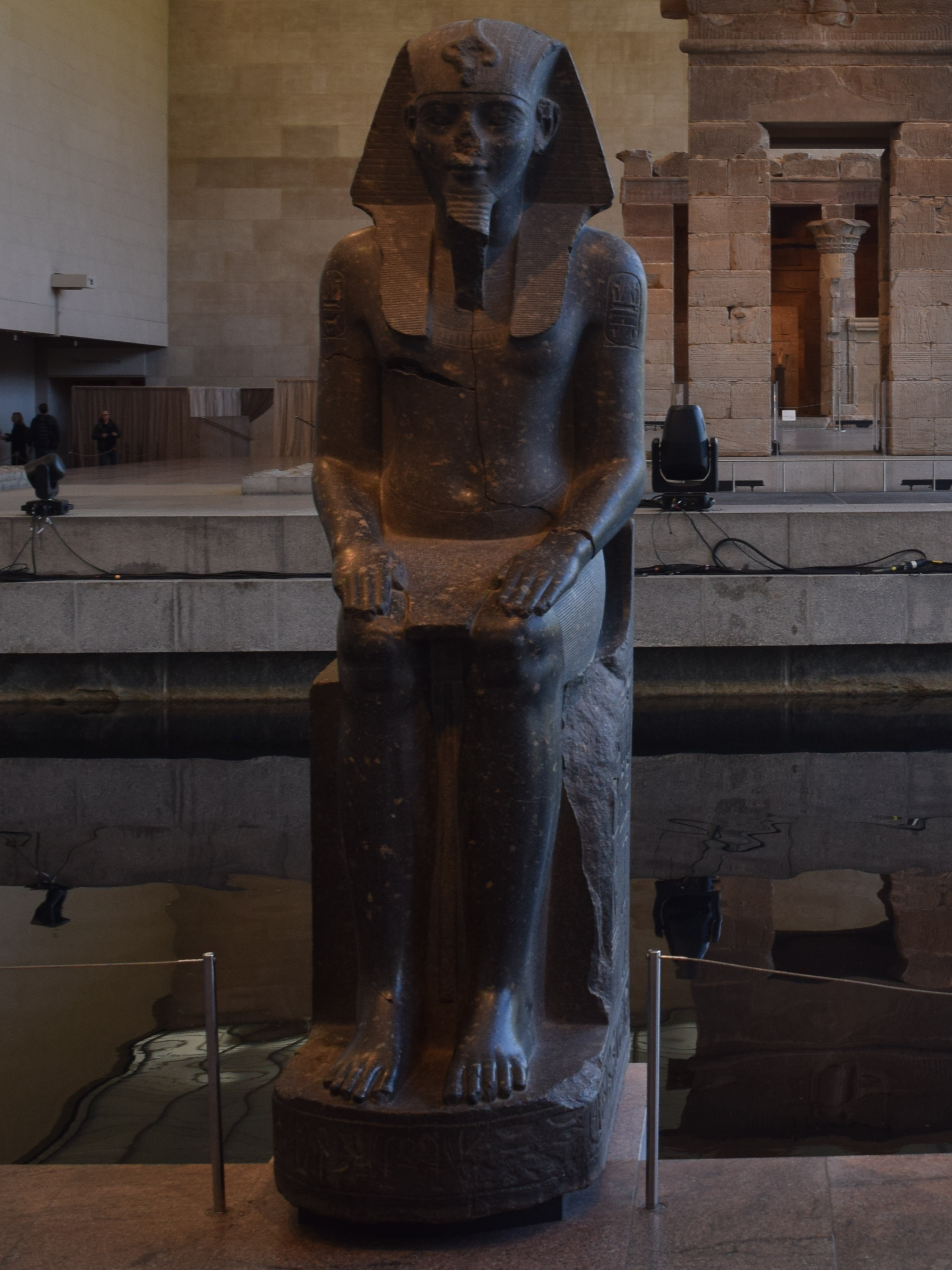
Merneptah (usurped and recarved from Amenhotep III)

== See also ==
- Art of ancient Egypt
- Ancient Egyptian religion
