= Ka statue of king Hor =

18th-century BC Egyptian statue

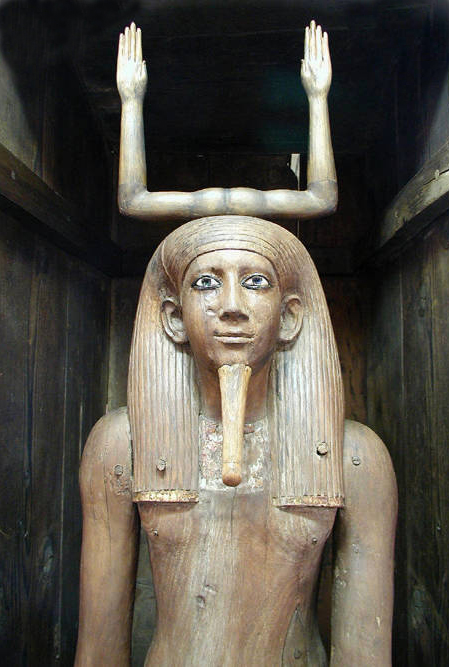
- Material: Wood
- Height: 1.7 meters
- Width: 27 cm
- Created: c. 1750 BC
- Discovered: 1894; Giza, Egypt
- Present location: Egyptian Museum, Cairo, Egypt
- Identification: JE 30948, CG 259

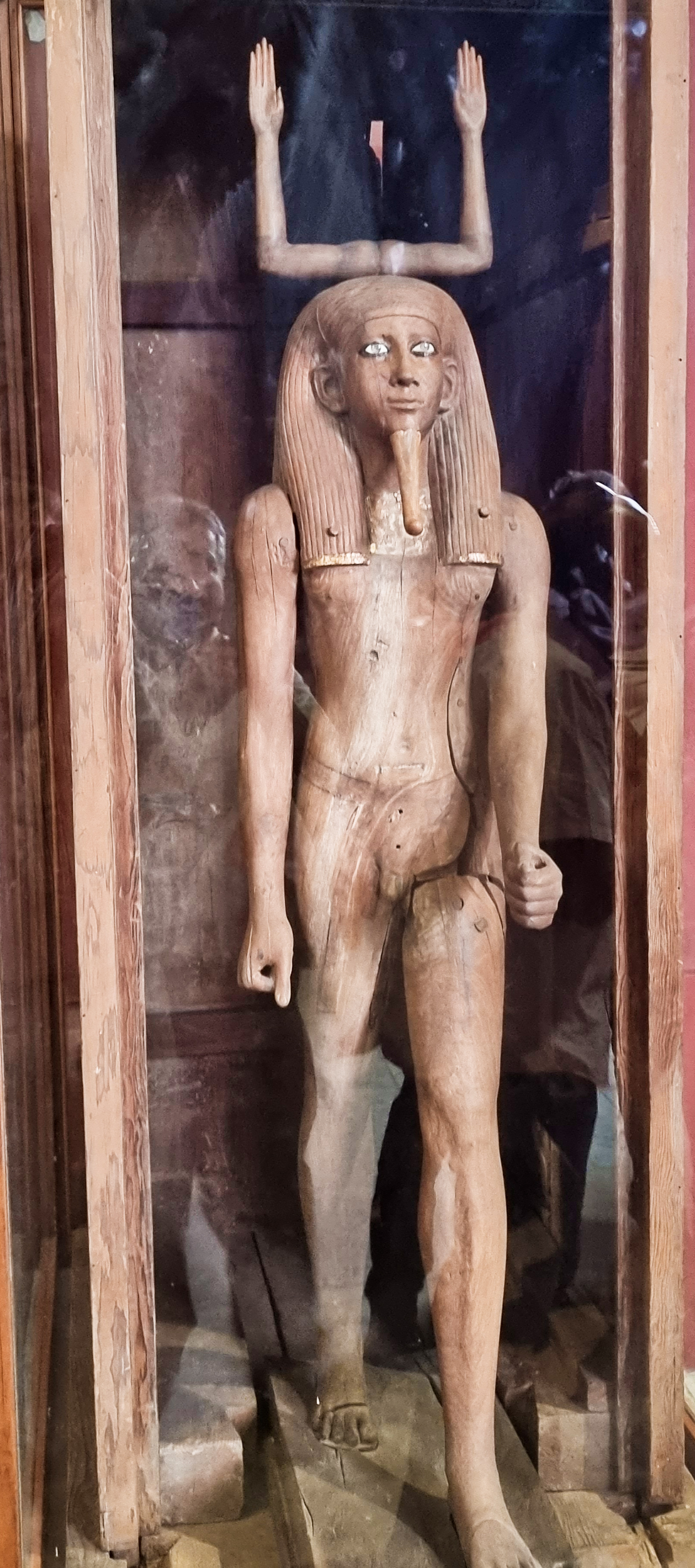
The statue and its wooden naos (shrine), on display at the Egyptian Museum, Cairo (2022)

The Ka statue of King Hor dates to the 13th Dynasty of Ancient Egypt around 1750 BC. It is now on display in the Egyptian Museum in Cairo and regarded as one of the major works of Egyptian art.

The statue was excavated in 1894 in the tomb of King Hor that was found by a team of excavators under the direction of Jacques de Morgan. The tomb is located close to the pyramid of Amenemhat III at Dahshur.

== Description ==
The statue proper is 1.35 meters high. With base and ka-sign on the head, it is 1.7 meters high. The statue is made of wood, that was once covered with a thin layer of stucco that is gone today. The king is shown naked but there are traces on the wood, belonging to a belt. The statue might once have been adorned with a kilt. Around the neck the king bears a broad collar. The statue once was holding a staff and a scepter. On the head he bears today a Ka-sign that was found next to the statue.

The statue and its Ka-sign were found together in the king's tomb within a wooden naos (shrine) that was lying on its back; the statue inside was also on its back. The naos was once partly-adorned with gold foil and hieroglyphic inscriptions presenting the king's names, but these are today lost.

== Significance ==
Ancient Egyptians believed they had several types of souls or spirits. The Ka was the most important and the statue shows the king as his Ka. Dorothea Arnold observed that many offerings were found around the statue. She wonders whether the statue was once made for the king's cult temple. However the king reigned only very briefly; the temple was never built and the statue was placed into the tomb chamber.

As an important work of art, the statue appears in many art histories of Ancient Egypt. W. Stevenson Smith sees in the figure an idealized naturalism, as other works of royal sculpture dating to about the late Twelfth Dynasty show often an elderly face, while that of Hor is idealized young.
