= Merankhre Mentuhotep =

Theban king

Merankhre Mentuhotep VI
- Montuhotep VI
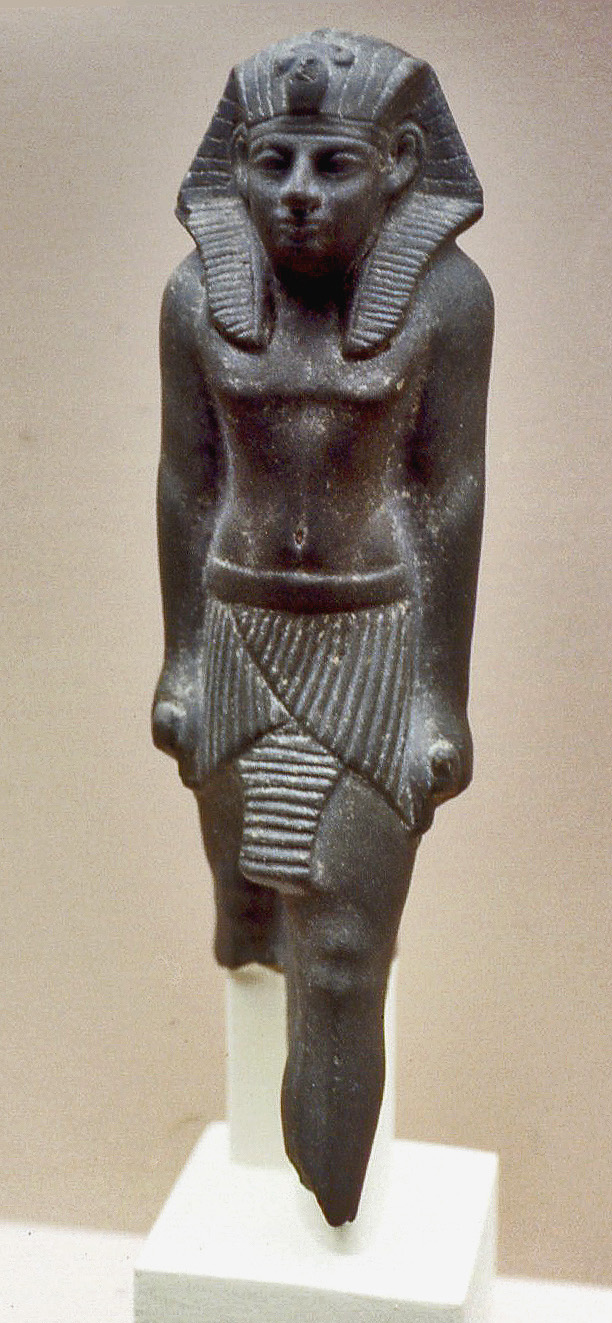
- Statue of Mentuhotep VI, British Museum EA 65429.

Pharaoh
- Reign: short, ca. 1585 BC
- Predecessor: uncertain, Djedankhre Montemsaf
- Successor: uncertain, Senusret IV
Royal titulary
Prenomen
Merankhre
Mr-ˁnḫ-Rˁ
He whose life is beloved by Ra
M23 t L2 t < N5 U7 S34 >
Nomen
Mentuhotep
Mn-ṯw-ḥtp
Montu is content
G39 N5 < Y5 N35 V13 w R4 >
- Consort: Sitmut ?
- Children: Herunefer ?
- Dynasty: 16th dynasty

Merankhre Mentuhotep VI was a Theban king of the Sixteenth Dynasty of Egypt based in Upper Egypt during the Second Intermediate Period. He was perhaps the 14th king of the dynasty.

== Attestations ==
Merankhre Mentuhotep is only attested through two statuettes, JE 37418/CG 42021 and BM EA 65429. The first, discovered in the Karnak cachette by Georges Legrain, is missing its head and feet and gives the king's nomen and prenomen as well as a dedication to the god Sobek, lord of smnw. The second statuette, whose origin is unknown, also bears the titulary of the king but with no dedication.

Another possible attestation of Merankhre Mentuhotep VI is given by a fragment of a wooden coffin, now in the British Museum under the catalog number BM EA 29997. The coffin bears the following text:

The Patrician, Royal Representative, Eldest King's son, the Senior Commander Herunefer, true of voice, who was begotten by king Mentuhotep, true of voice, and borne by the senior Queen Sitmut.

The prenomen of the king Mentuhotep is missing and the identification of this Mentuhotep remains problematic. Kim Ryholt notes however that the coffin is also inscribed with an early version of passages of the Book of the Dead, which is one of only two pre-New Kingdom inscriptions of this text. Thus, Ryholt argues that this Mentuhotep must have reigned during the late Second Intermediate Period. Thus three kings could possibly be the one mentioned on the coffin: Seankhenre Mentuhotepi, Sewadjare Mentuhotep V and Merankhre Mentuhotep VI. Although it sounds similar to Mentuhotep, Ryholt has shown that Mentuhotepi is a different name than Mentuhotep and would therefore not have been reported as Mentuhotep. To decide between the two remaining kings, Ryholt notes that the other instance of the Book of the Dead is found on the coffin of queen Mentuhotep, wife of Djehuti, the second pharaoh of the 16th Dynasty who reigned c. 1645 BC. In this case, the text is almost identical to that found on Herunefer's coffin, which argues for a close proximity in time between the two. While Sewadjare Mentuhotep reigned c. 10 years before Djehuti, Merankhre Mentuhotep is believed to have reigned 60 years after him. Hence, Ryholt concludes that Sewadjare Mentuhotep is the Mentuhotep of the coffin, Sitmut his queen and Herunefer his son. This identification is far from certain however, and Aidan Dodson and Dyan Hilton have instead dated the coffin to the end of the 16th dynasty, thereby giving Herunefer as the son of Merankhre Mentuhotep VI and Sitmut as his wife.

== Chronological position ==
Merankhre Mentuhotep is not attested on the surviving fragments of the Turin canon, his reign and those of four other kings of the end of the 16th Dynasty being lost in a lacuna. For this reason, the exact chronological position as well as the length of his reign cannot be ascertained. Ryholt proposes that Merankhre Mentuhotep was a king of the late 16th dynasty based on two arguments. First, his prenomen Merankhre has the form X-ankh-re, similar to that of Djedankhre Montemsaf and both kings bear the nomen Montu-X which indicates that they succeeded one another closely in time. Second, the first statuette of Merankhre Mentuhotep is dedicated to Sobek of smnw (Sumenu) and was therefore probably set up at el-Mahamid Qibli near Gebelein where both Dedumose II and Djedankhre Montemsaf are attested before being moved to the Karnak cachette at a later point in time, perhaps at the collapse of the dynasty.

In an older study conducted in 1964 by Jürgen von Beckerath, Merankhre Mentuhotep was classified as a king of the 13th Dynasty.
