= Dedumose =

Dedumose may refer to:

- Dedumose I, an Egyptian pharaoh of the Second Intermediate Period
- Dedumose II, an Egyptian pharaoh during the Second Intermediate Period
