= Tomb of Iti and Neferu =

Ancient Egyptian tomb from Gebelein

- Burial site of Iti and Neferu
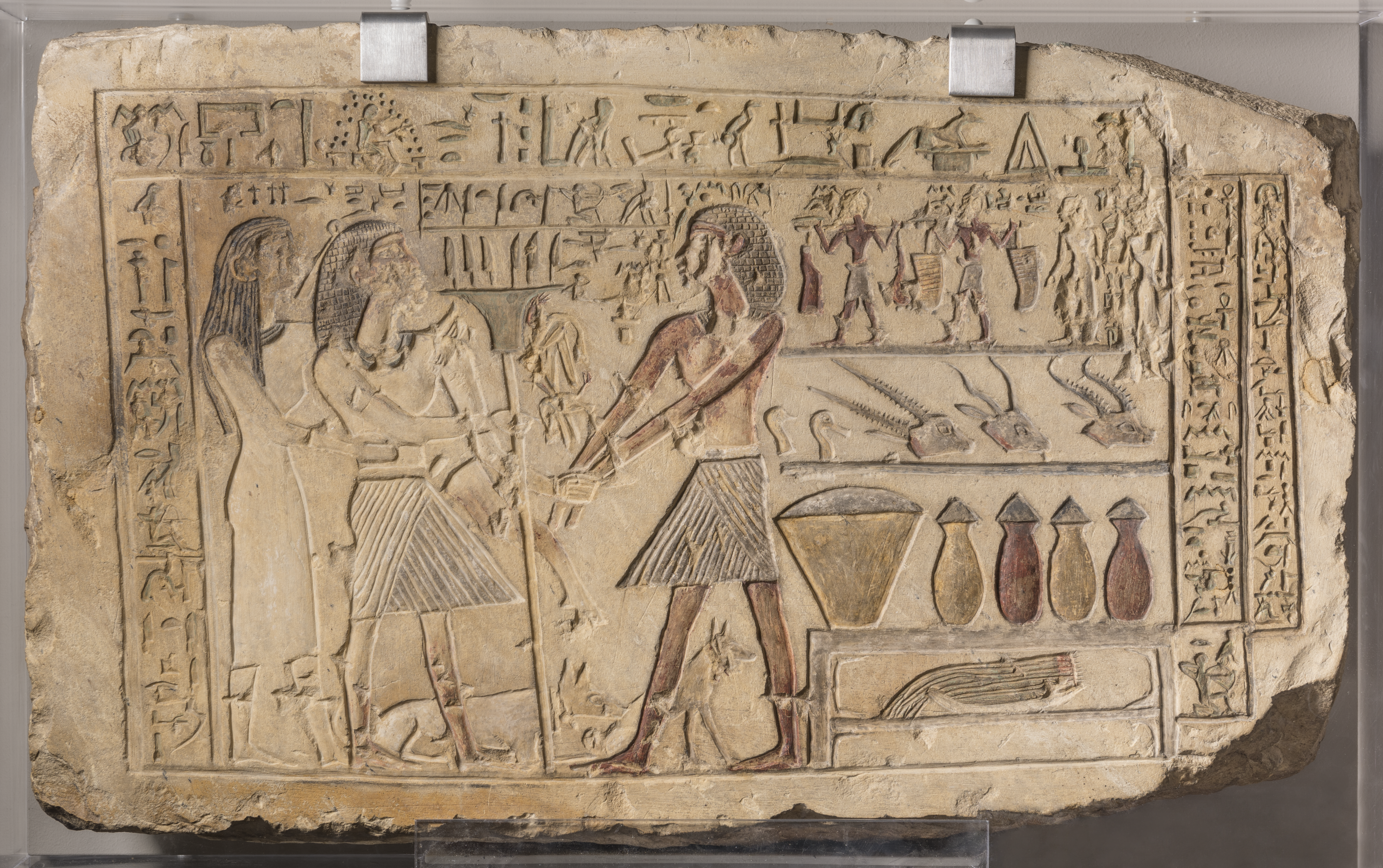
- Funerary stela showing Iti and Neferu receiving food offerings, in the Museo Egizio, Turin (Suppl. 13114)
- Location: Northern hill necropolis, Gebelein, Egypt
- Discovered: 1911
- Excavated by: Virginio Rosa

The Tomb of Iti and Neferu is a semi-rock-cut Egyptian tomb from the northern necropolis of the northern hill of Gebelein, in Egypt. The tomb belonged to Iti, "Chief of the troops" and "Treasurer of the King", and to his wife Neferu. The complex is dated to the First Intermediate Period of Egypt, between 2118 and 1980 BC. Most of the wall paintings and several objects from the burial equipment are kept in the Museo Egizio in Turin.

== Owners ==
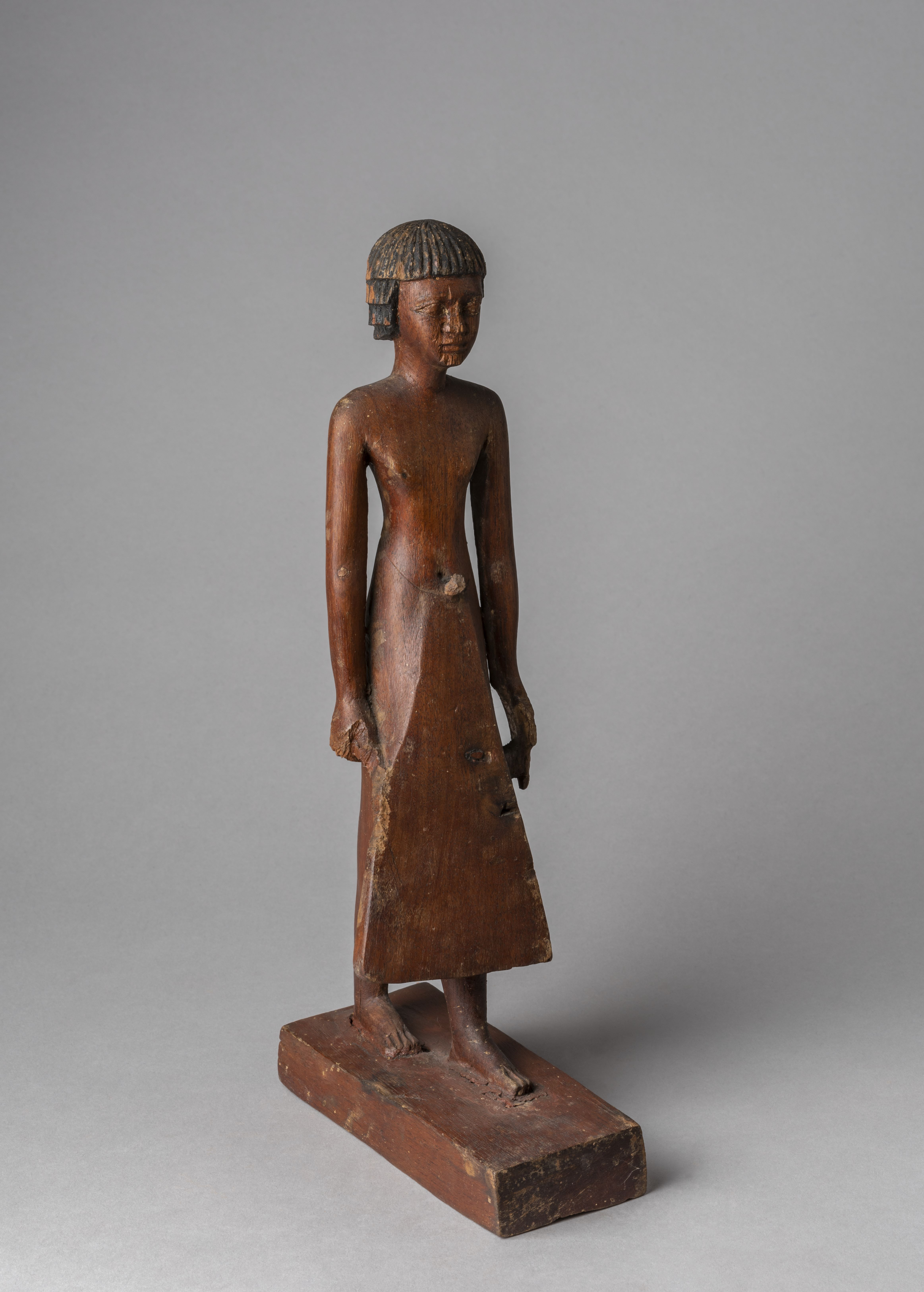
Wooden statuette of Iti, Museo Egizio, Turin, Suppl. 13720.

Iti is recorded in the tomb sources as "Chief of the troops" and "Treasurer of the King". Neferu, his wife, is depicted with him on the funerary stela and in some of the wall paintings from the tomb.

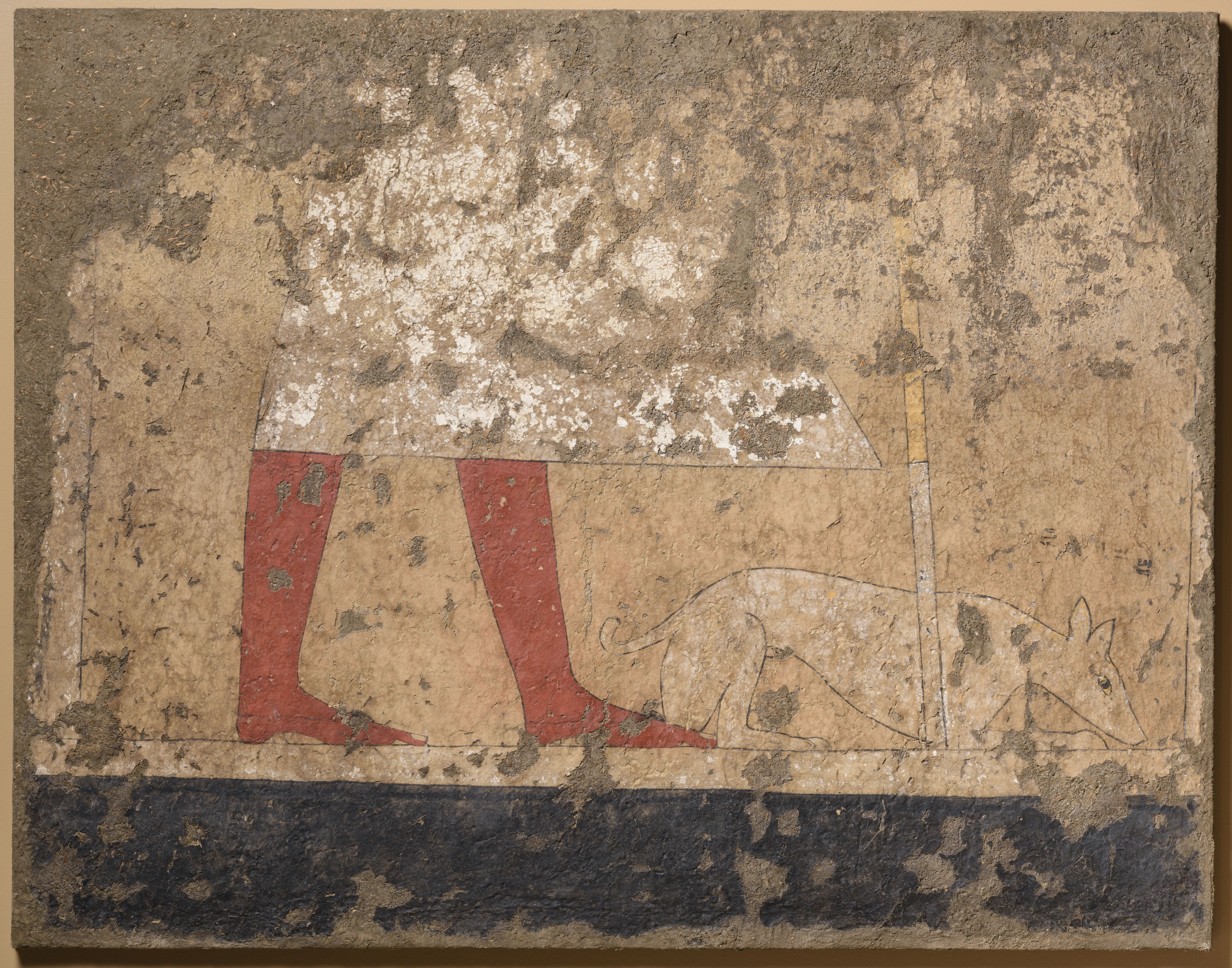
Wall painting showing Iti with a greyhound, straw-and-mud plaster, Museo Egizio, Turin, Suppl. 14354/01.

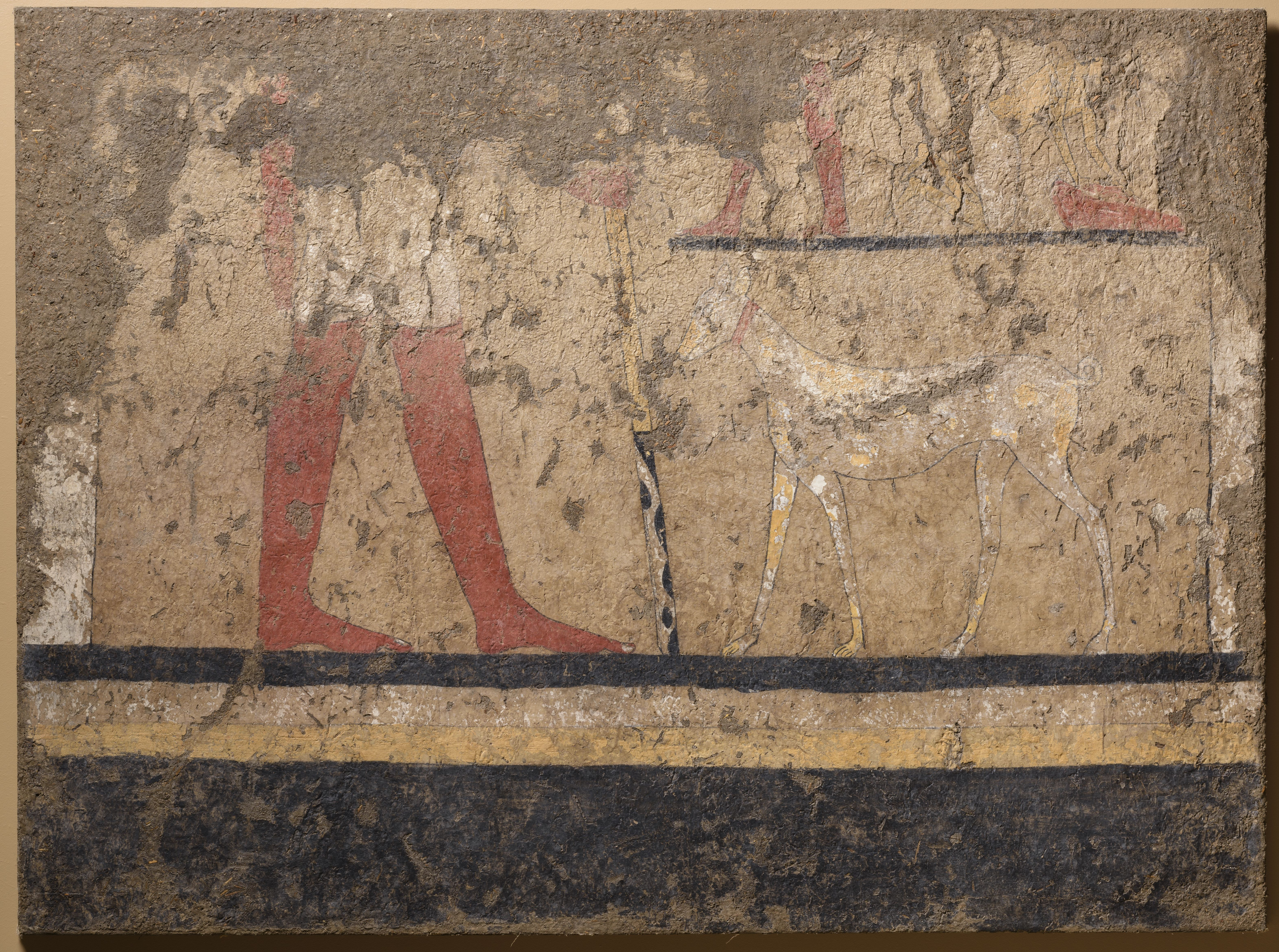
Wall painting showing Iti in front of a greyhound, straw-and-mud plaster, Museo Egizio, Turin, Suppl. 14354/03.

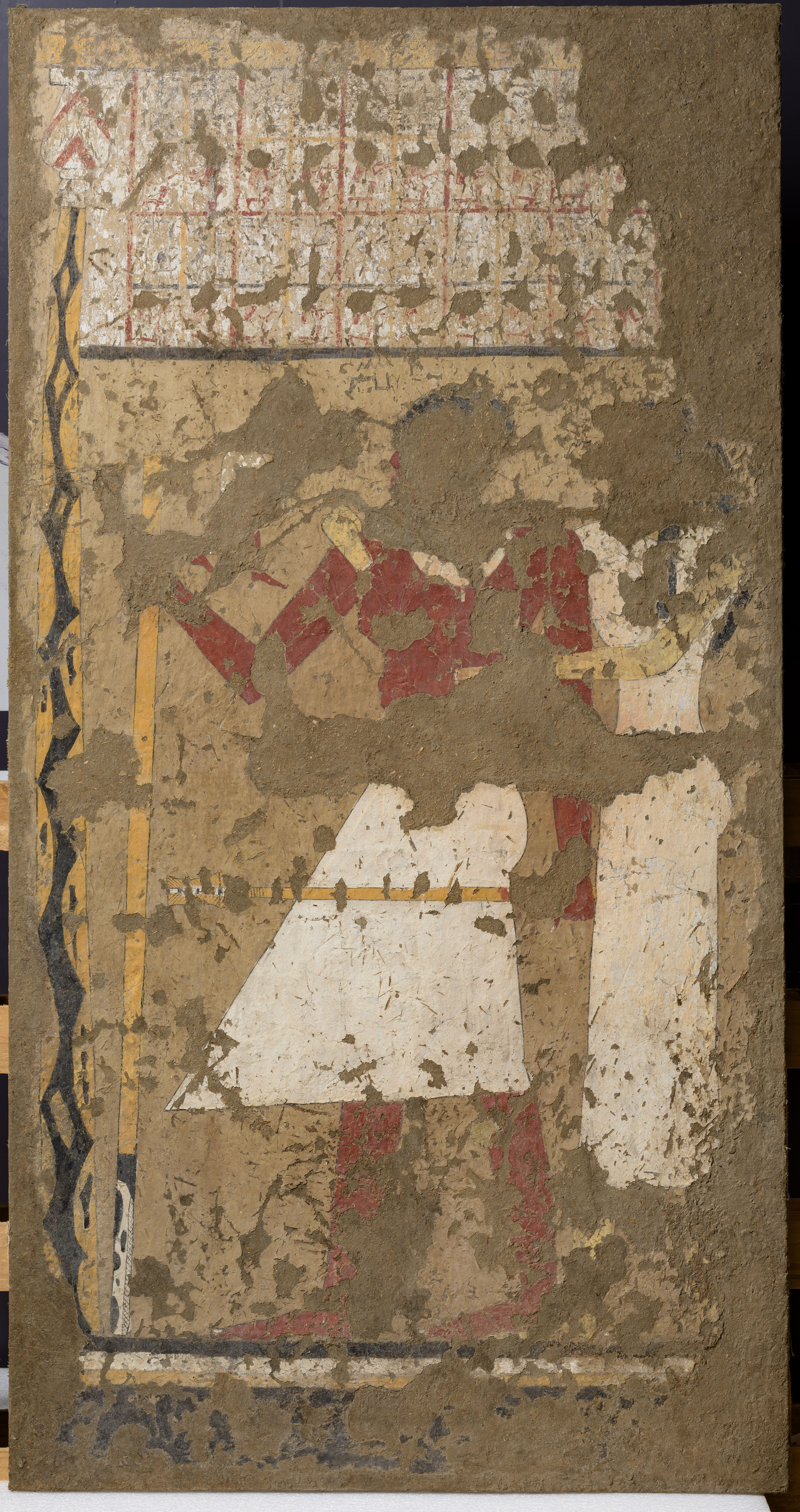
Wall painting showing the deceased and his wife; above, a list of offerings, Museo Egizio, Turin, Suppl. 14354/11.

== History ==
The tomb belongs to the final phase of the First Intermediate Period and to the transition toward the Middle Kingdom of Egypt.

=== Excavation ===
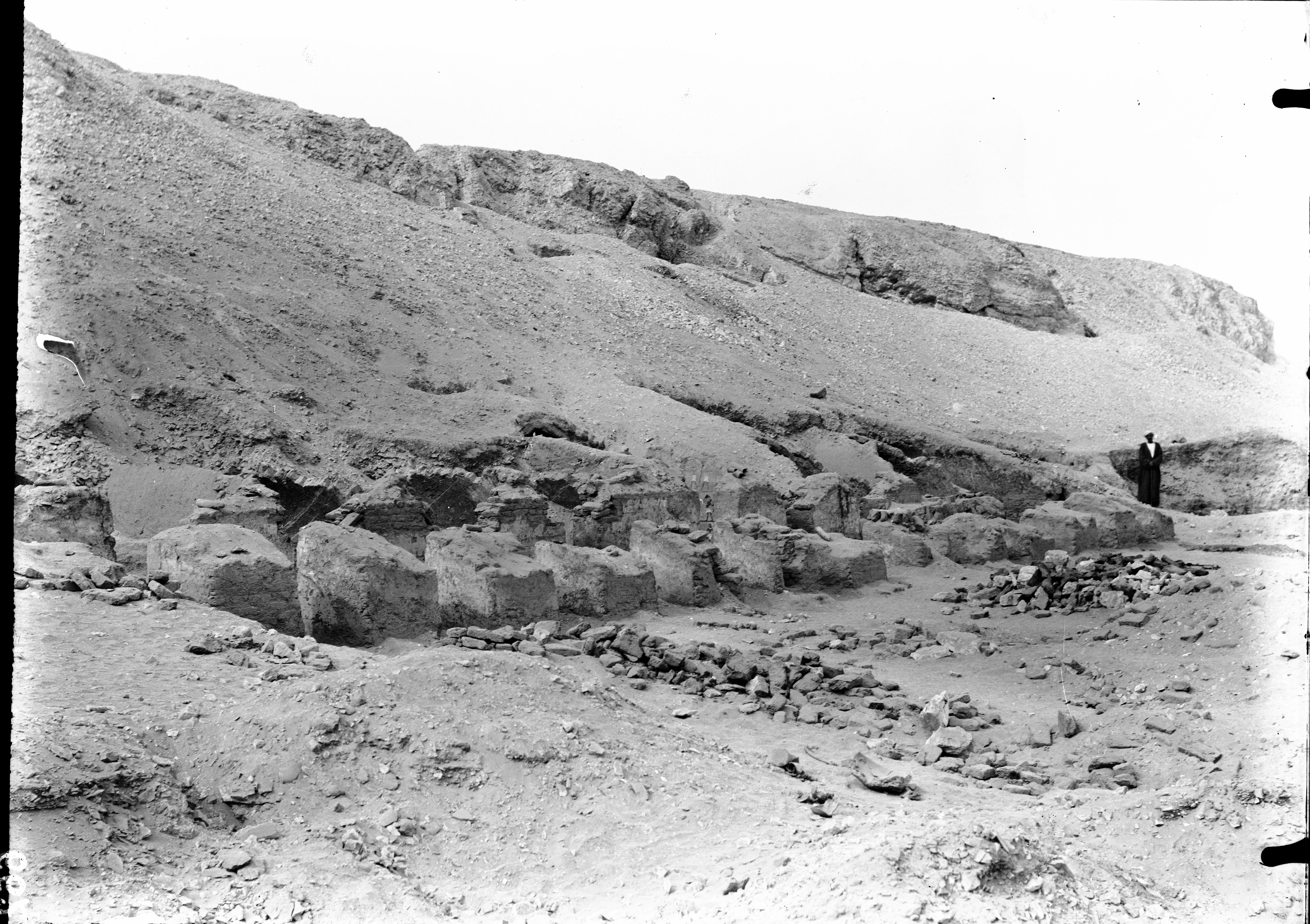
Exterior of the tomb before the beginning of the work, January 1911; the bases of the pillars of the outer portico are visible.

The tomb was discovered in 1911 by Virginio Rosa, a collaborator of Ernesto Schiaparelli, during the Italian excavations at Gebelein. A photograph taken in early January 1911 documents the exterior of the tomb before the start of the work, when the bases of the fourteen pillars of the outer portico were already visible. The clearance work brought to light the central part of the semi-rock-cut structure, the vault of the central chapel and some paintings of the portico in front of it.

At the time of excavation the tomb had no roof and offered no protection to the paintings; before the detachment of 1914, the surfaces underwent light cleaning, initial consolidation and protection with yellow paper and fine sand. Before packing and transport, the objects from the burial equipment were inventoried and photographed, often grouped together.

Seven colour plates taken during the work in the tomb are preserved in the Rosa collection of the photographic archive of the Museo Egizio; their attribution to Rosa is considered probable, although the photographs may also be connected with Giovanni Marro, who was present in 1914 during the detachment of the paintings.

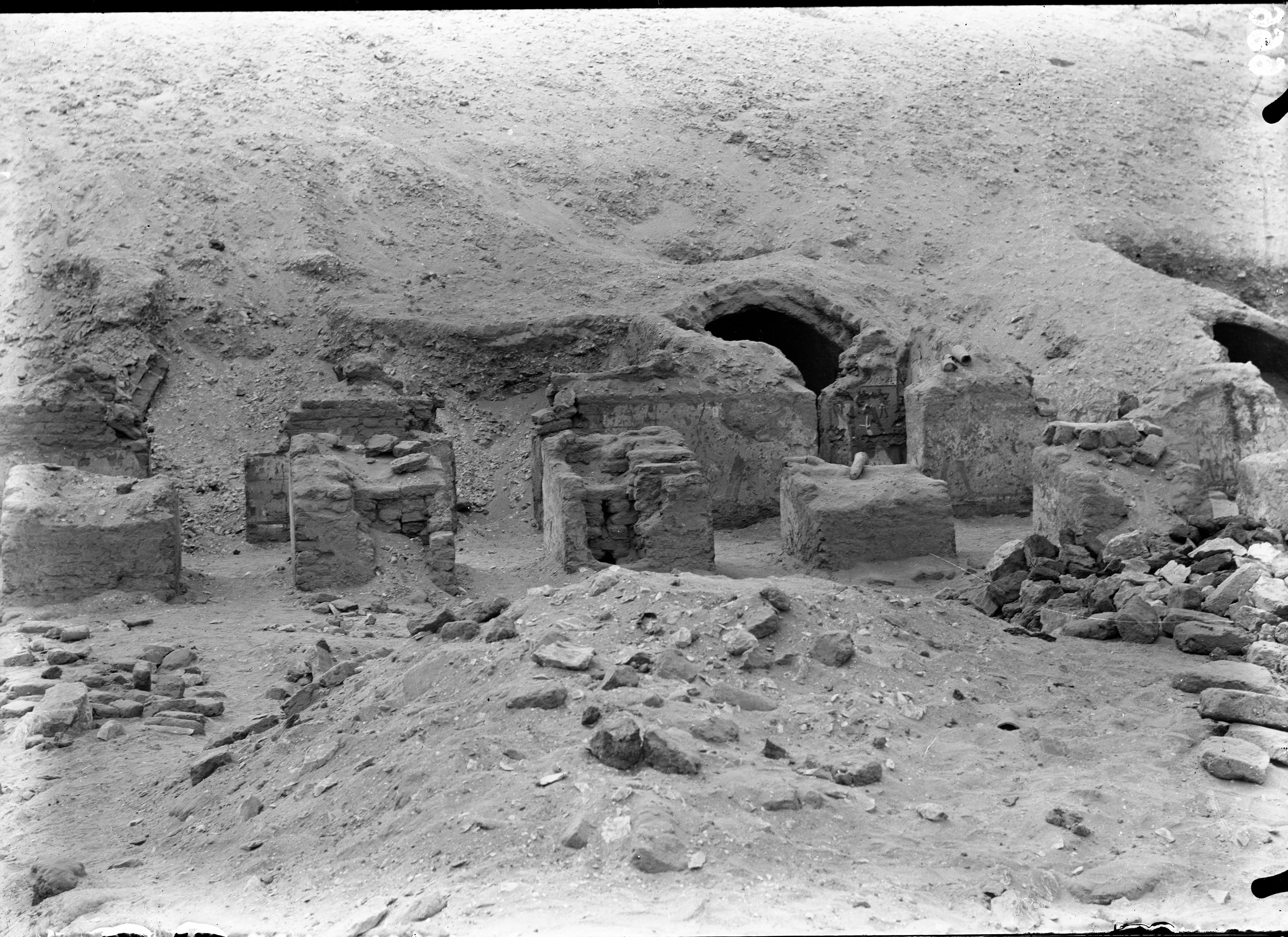
Central part of the semi-rock-cut structure, with the vault of the central chapel and paintings of the portico.

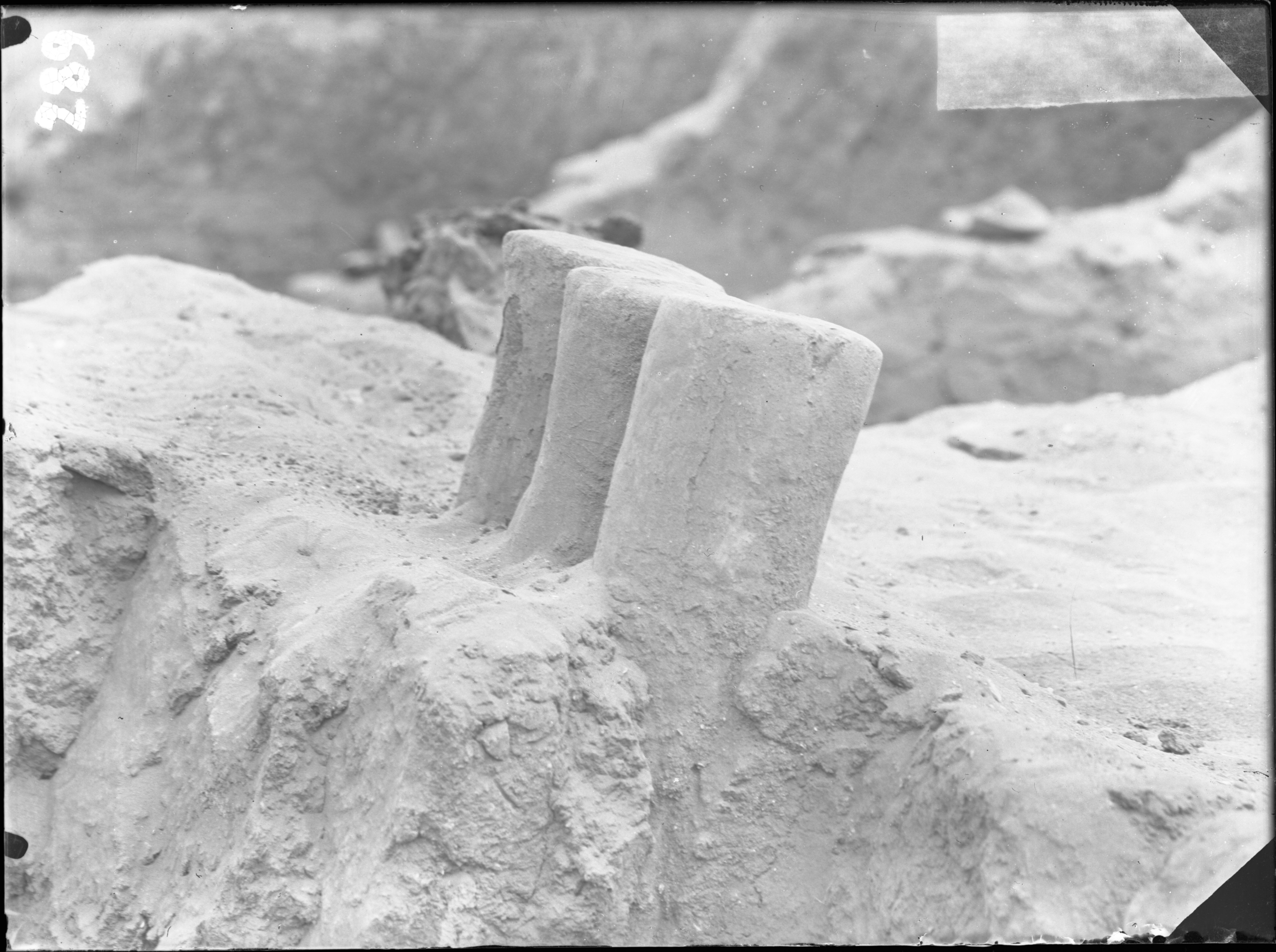
Three funerary cones still set into the tomb masonry.

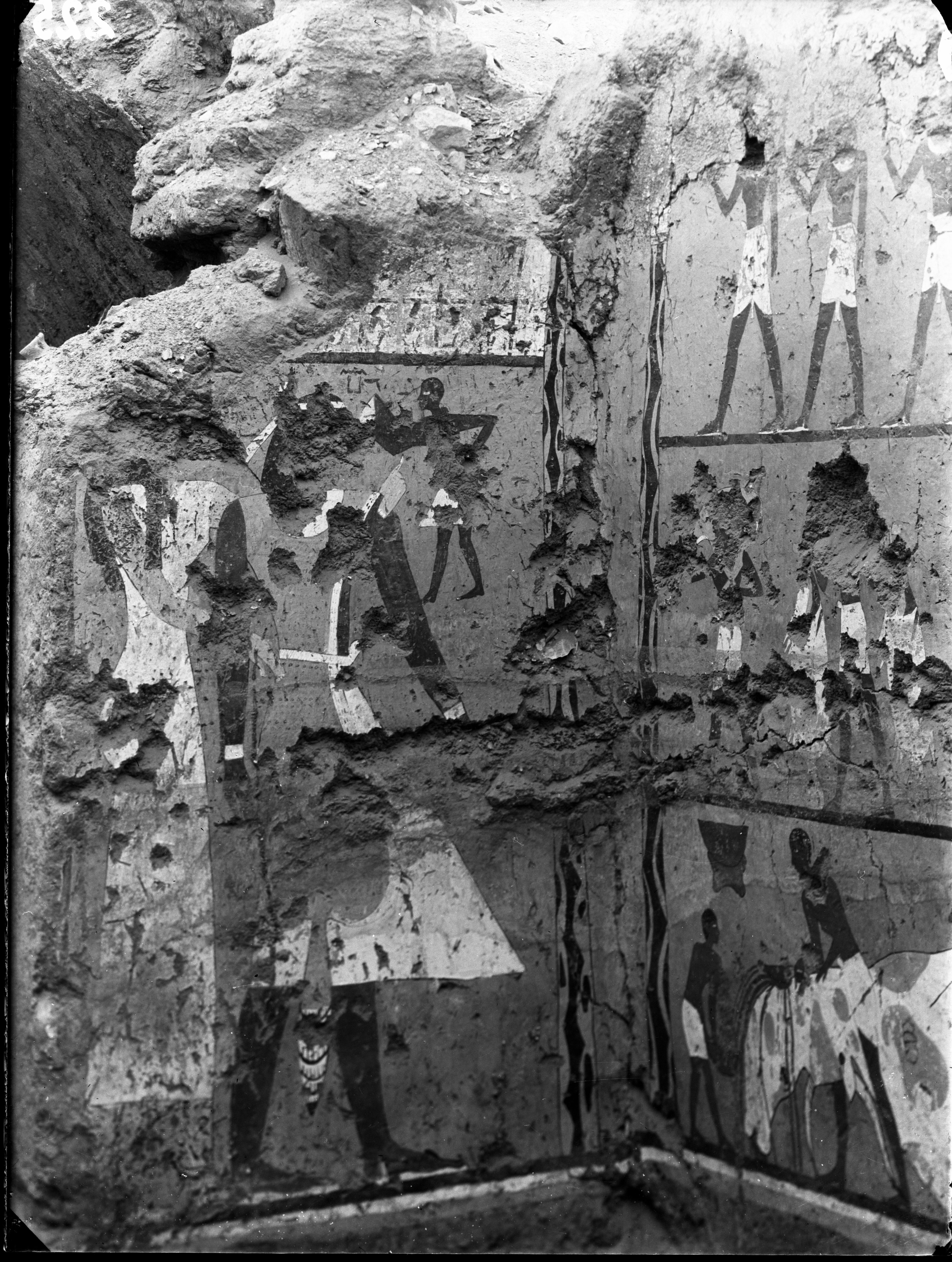
Corner between the rear wall and the right side wall of the chapel, with the depiction of the couple and scenes of cattle offering and ritual slaughter.

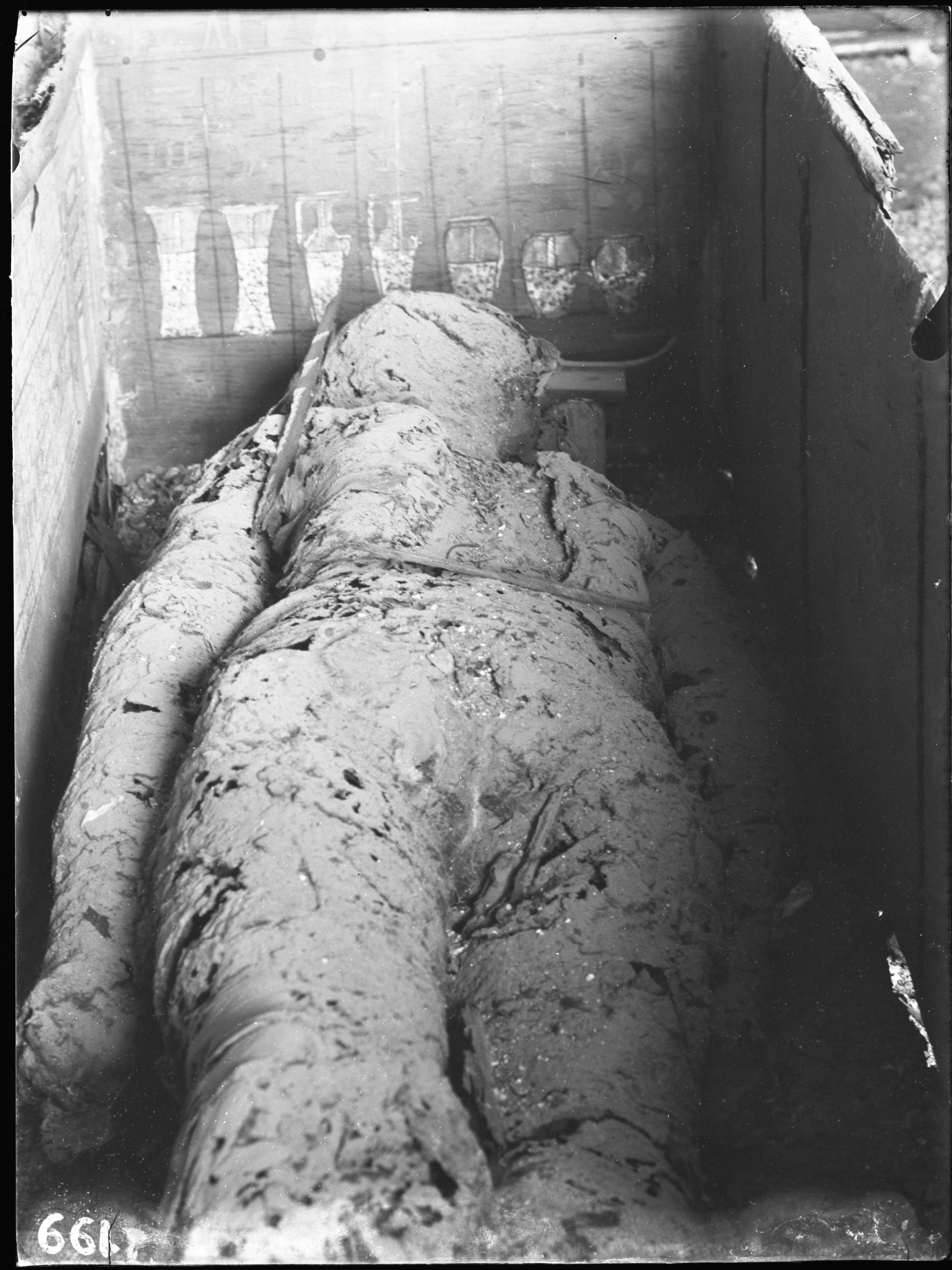
Cedar-wood coffin with the mummy of Iti, "chief of expeditions to the desert", at the time of its discovery by Virginio Rosa. The mummy is laid supine, with the limbs wrapped separately (S.13719). Schiaparelli excavations, 1911.

=== Conservation and museum display ===
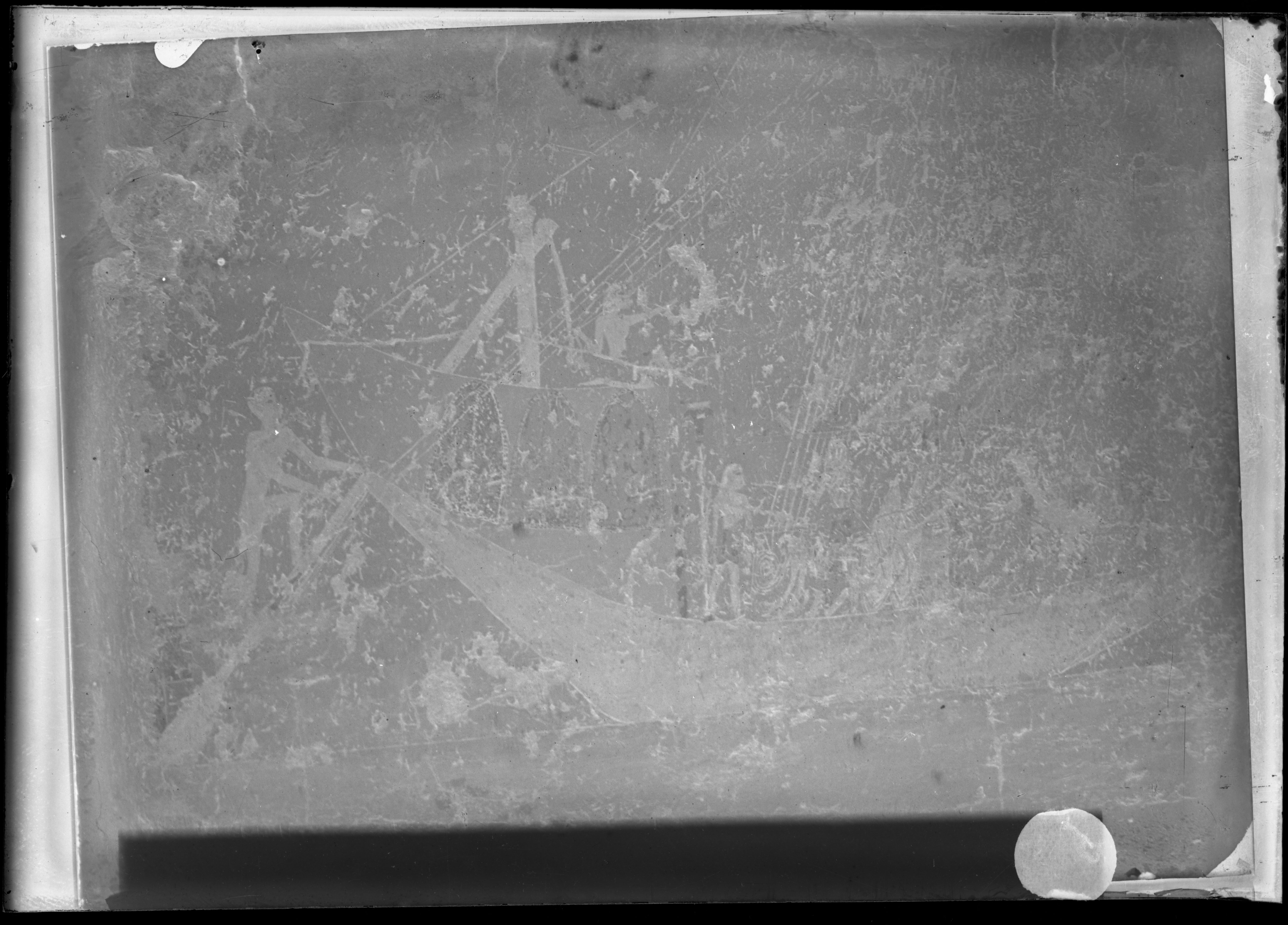
Painting detached and consolidated in 1914 for transport to Turin.

The paintings were detached from the tomb in 1914, consolidated for transport and transferred to Turin. The detachment was carried out by Giovanni Marro and Michelangelo Pizzo following the instructions of Fabrizio Lucarini; after their transfer to Italy, Lucarini oversaw the transfer of the paintings onto permanent canvas in Florence. In 1924 the detached paintings were exhibited in the cloister of the church of Sant'Apollonia in Florence, in an exhibition organized by Lucarini after the restoration. Of the thirty-six paintings detached from the tomb and brought to Turin in 1924, twenty-nine were displayed at the Museo Egizio in Turin.

During the reinstallation preceding the reopening of the museum in 2015, the twenty-nine fragments were the subject of multidisciplinary investigations into the execution technique, state of preservation and ancient and modern materials present on the surfaces. The analyses included ultraviolet observation, infrared reflectography, false-colour imaging, FORS, FT-IR and SEM-EDX; the infrared images made it possible to identify details of the preparatory drawing and two pentimenti, while the material analyses distinguished original pigments and plasters from modern interventions, including zinc white, paraffin and alkyd resin.

In 2025 the gallery devoted to the reconstruction of the tomb of Iti and Neferu was reinstalled on the basis of studies of the structure of the tomb, its fourteen pillars, comparisons with tombs of the same period and excavation photographs. During the research for the reinstallation, a painting belonging to the decorative cycle of the tomb was identified in the storerooms of the Museum of Anthropology and Ethnography of the University of Turin.

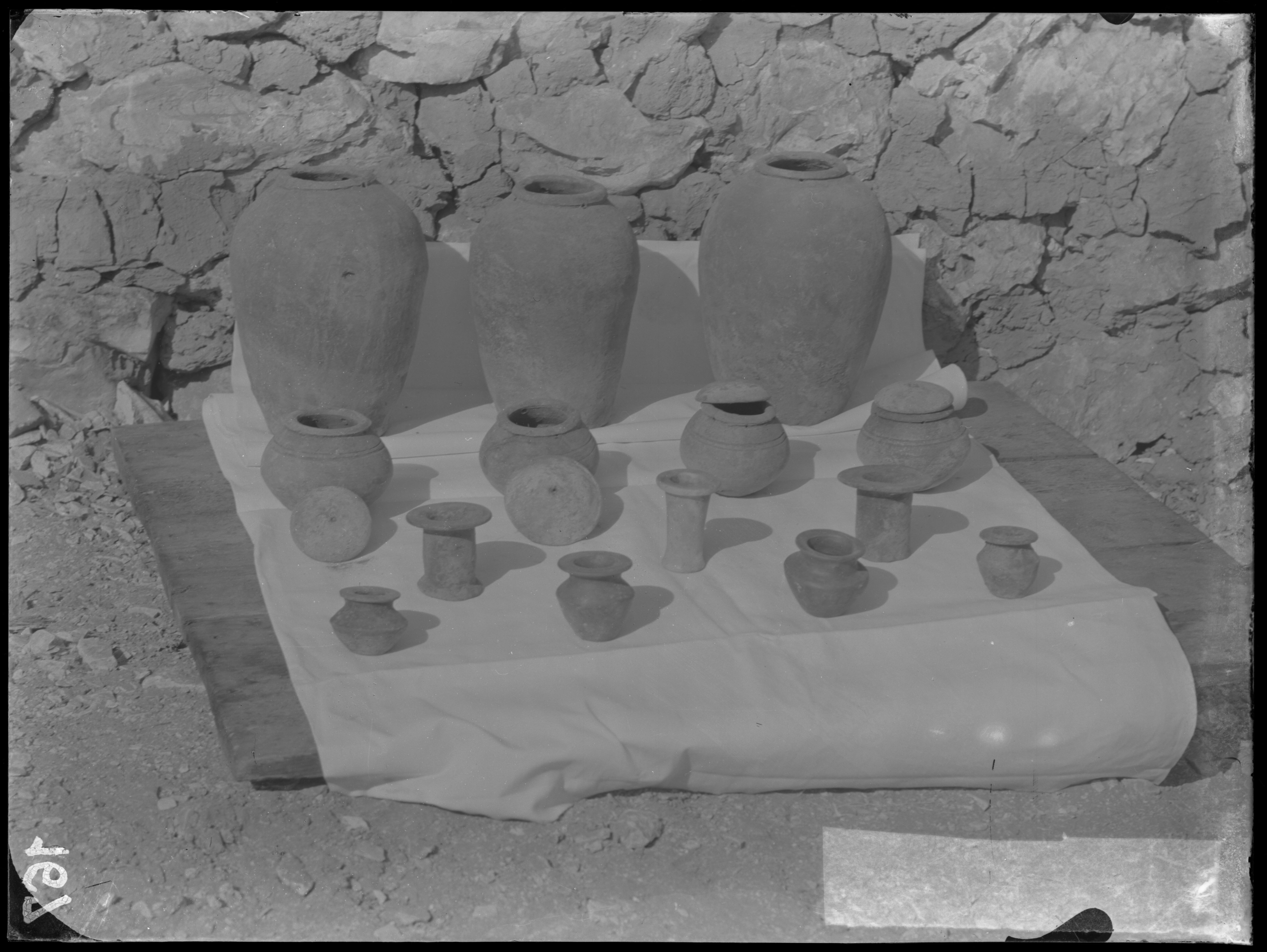
Burial equipment of Neferu photographed before packing for transport, with large terracotta jars, globular jars with lids, miniature vessels, black terracotta cylindrical jars and an alabaster cylindrical jar.

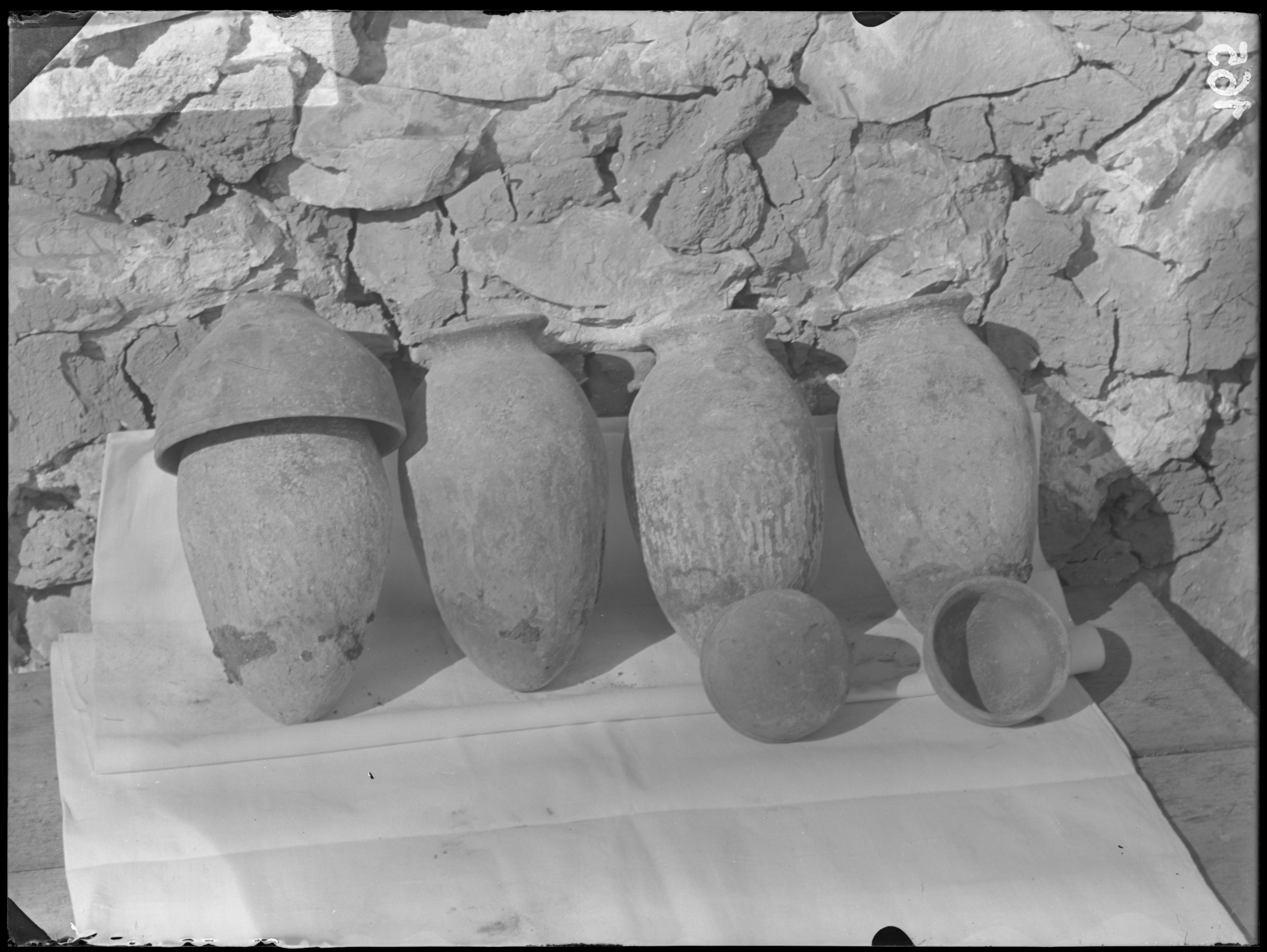
Burial equipment of Neferu photographed before packing for transport, with large terracotta jars, bowls and a dish.

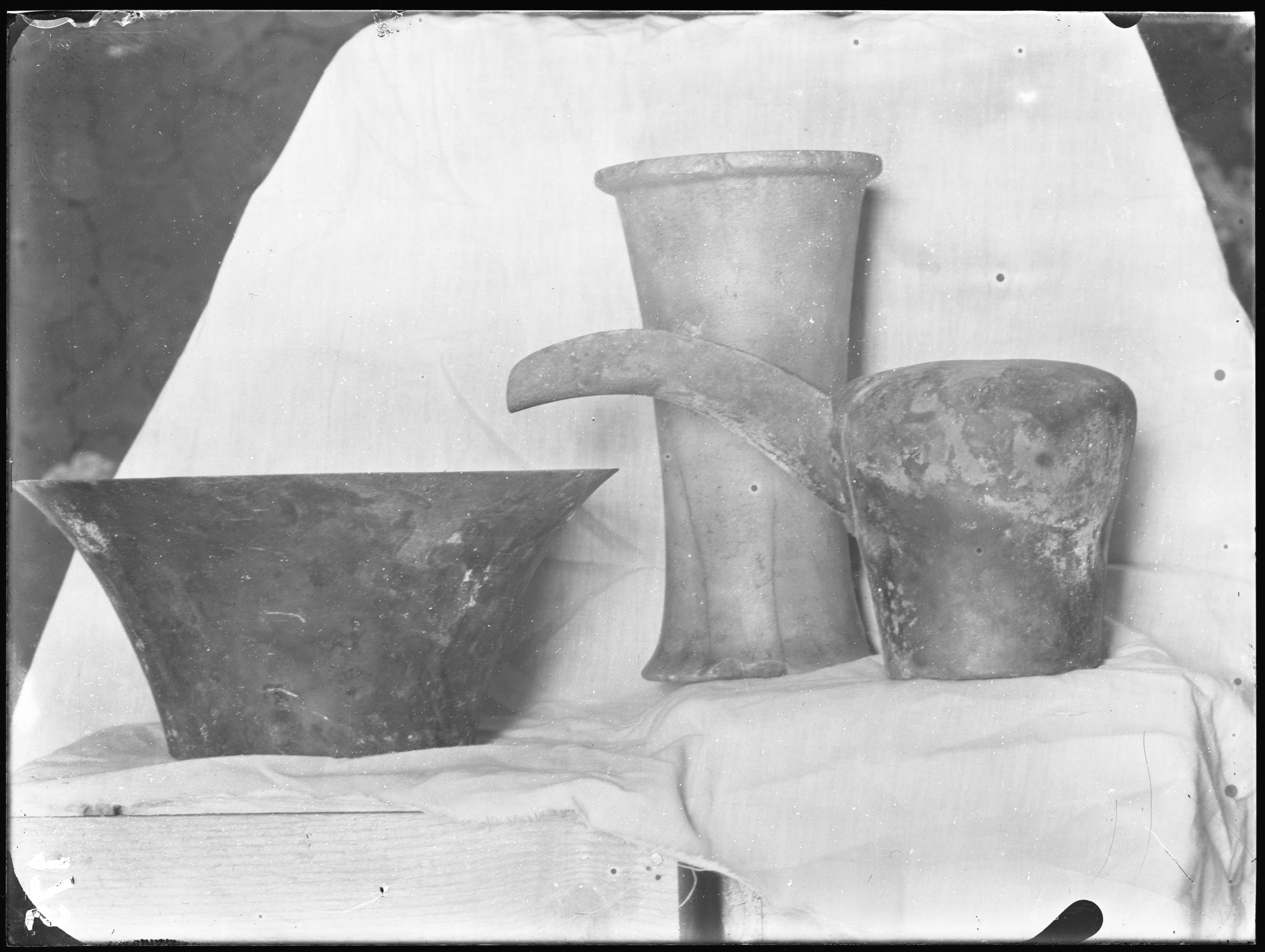
Burial equipment of Iti photographed before packing for transport, with an alabaster vessel in the centre and a bronze ewer and basin.

== Description ==
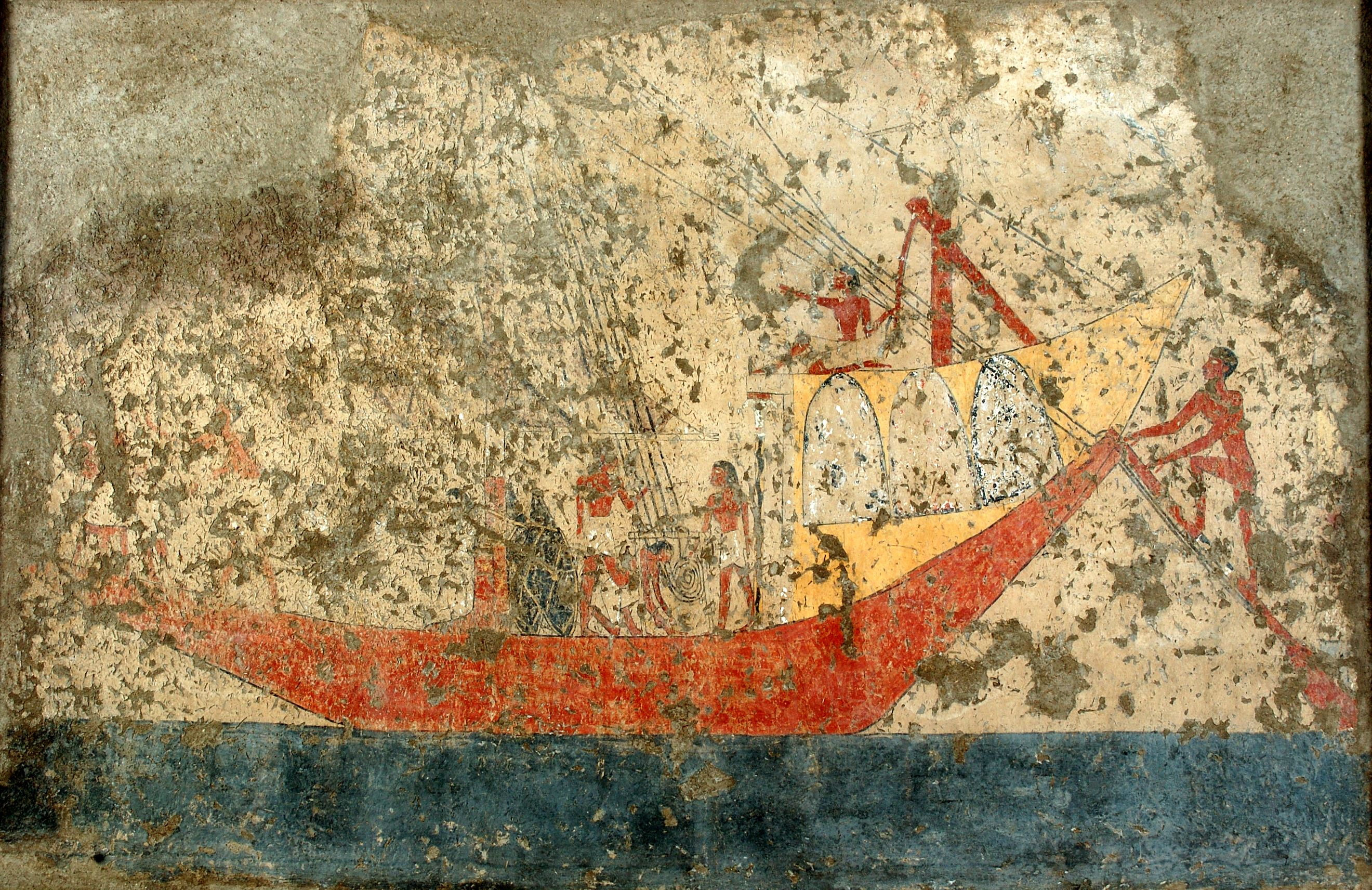
Wall painting showing a boat, a cabin decorated with shields, sailors, jars and monkeys, Museo Egizio, Turin, Suppl. 14354/07.

The tomb was semi-rock-cut and opened onto a courtyard carved into the rock. The façade, protected by the long portico delimited by fourteen pillars, was interrupted by eleven openings leading to as many rooms; the stretches of wall between one opening and the next were decorated.

The decoration consisted of tempera paintings on straw-and-mud plaster, preserved in the Museo Egizio in Turin. The paintings include richly detailed images with scenes of offering, agricultural activities, animal husbandry, grain transport, bread and beer making, animals, boats, craftsmen and armed figures. One scene shows the ritual slaughter of a bovine; another shows a cow with a newborn calf and a milking scene. Along the corridor there were scenes connected with daily life and work, including the transport and storage of grain and a carpenter's workshop.

One wall painting shows a boat with a cabin decorated with three shields; sailors at work, jars and three monkeys are represented on the deck. The presence of the shields on the boat cabin has been related to Iti's military title and to the role of local elites in the First Intermediate Period. The scene of the transport and storage of grain has been used as a comparison for granary models and for similar representations from Gebelein, including those on the coffin of Iqer.

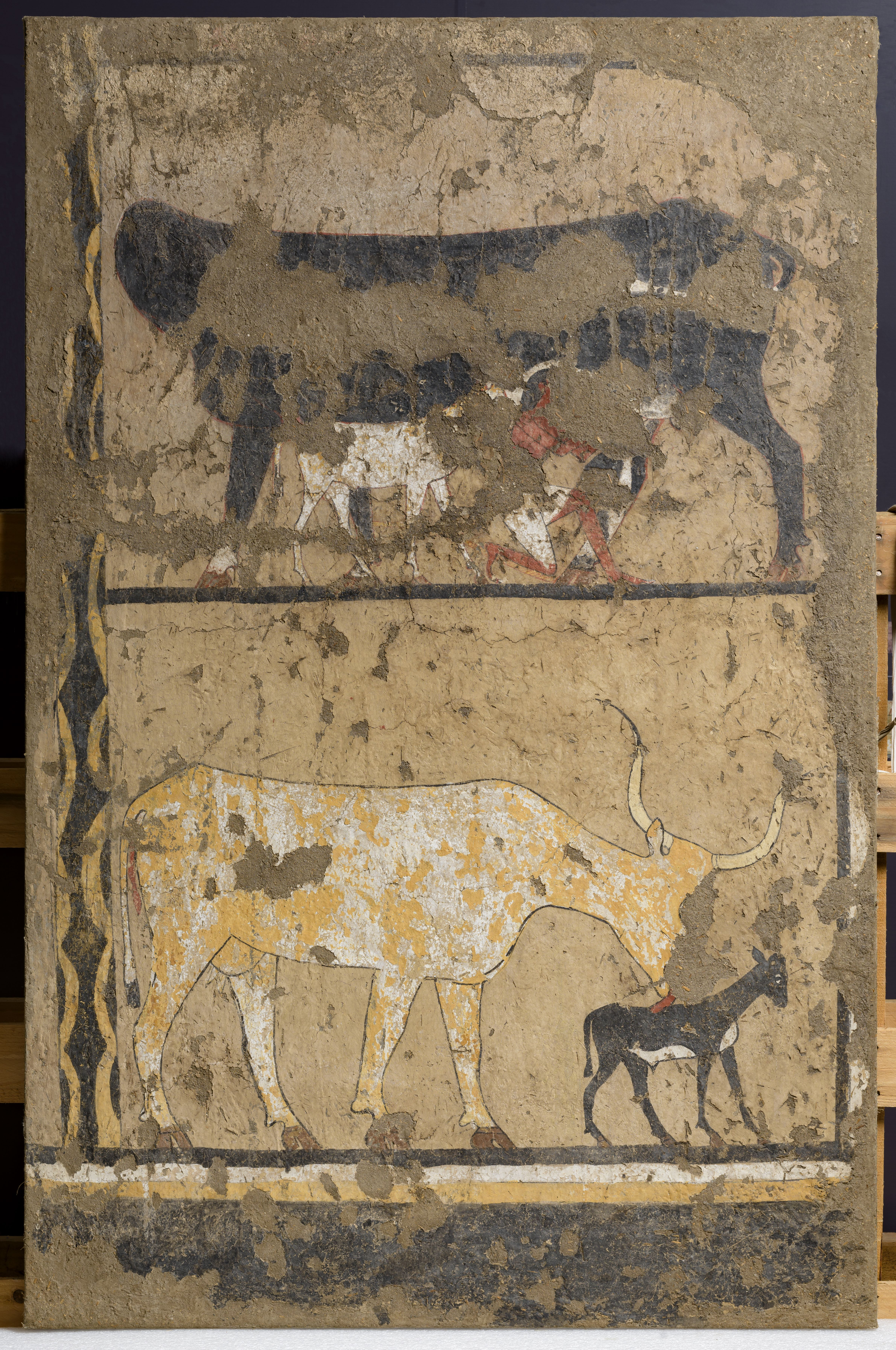
Wall painting showing a cow, newborn calf and milking scene, Museo Egizio, Turin, Suppl. 14354/13.

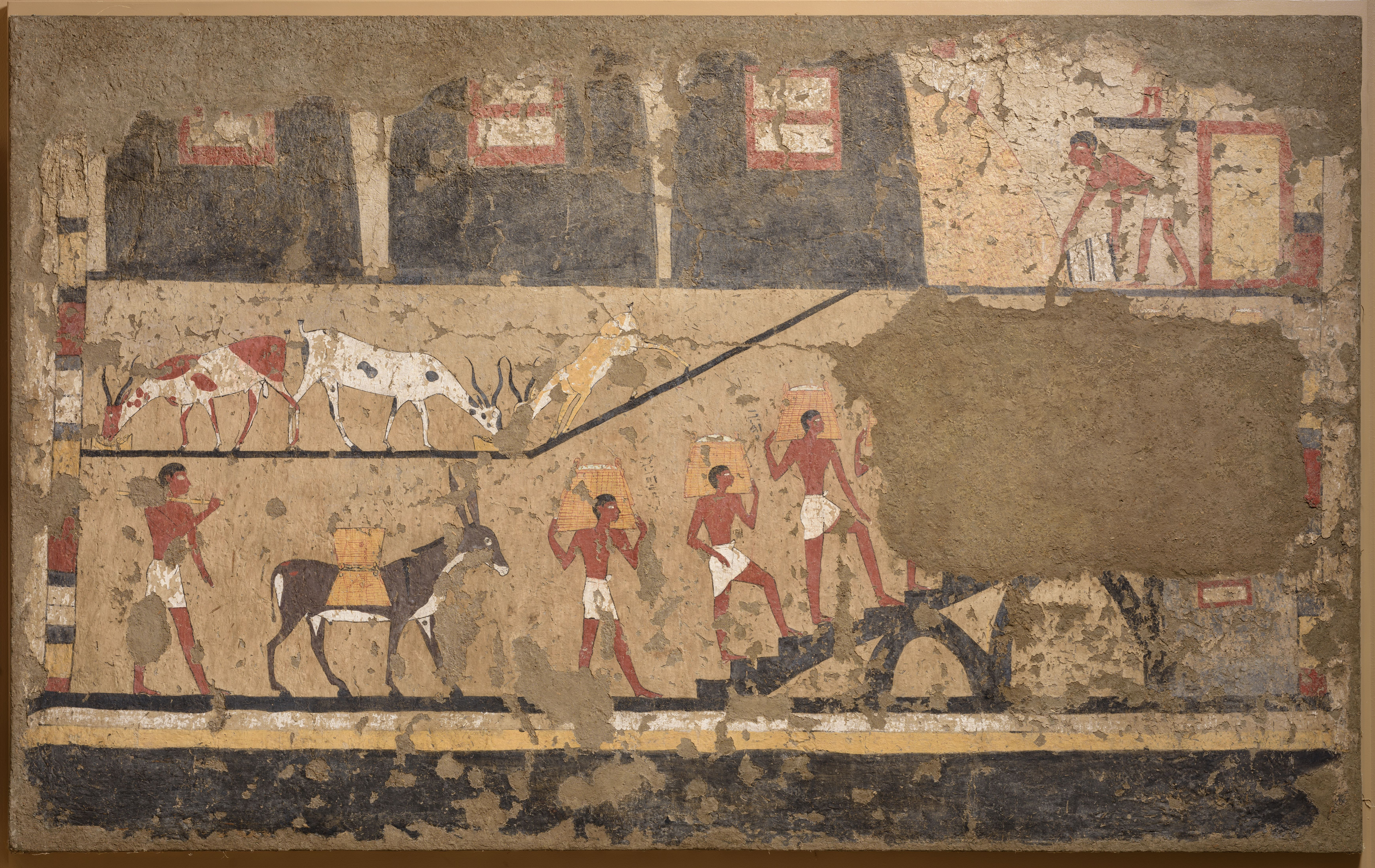
Wall painting showing the transport and storage of grain, Museo Egizio, Turin, Suppl. 14354/15.

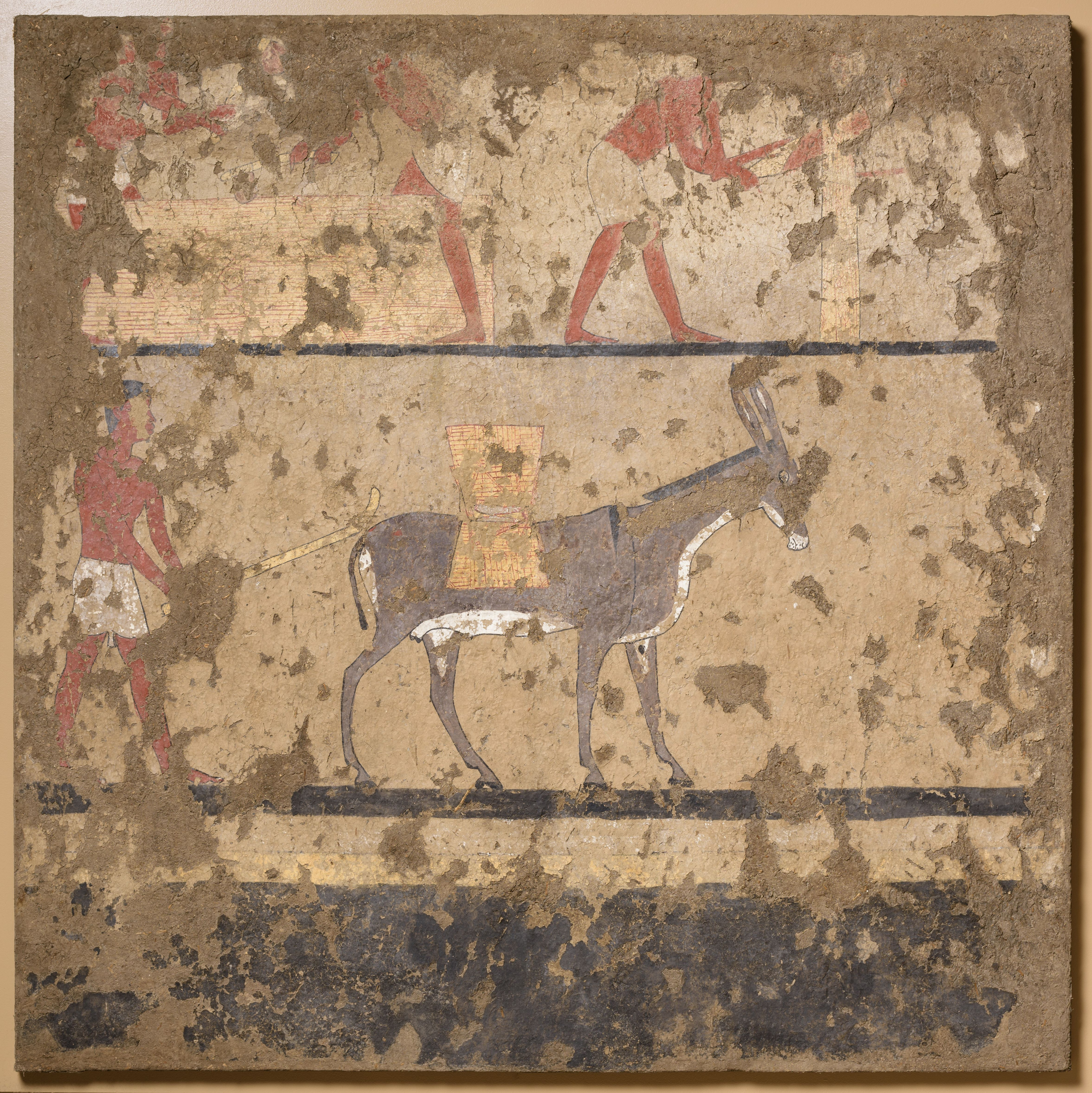
Wall painting showing a carpenter's workshop and a donkey carrying grain, Museo Egizio, Turin, Suppl. 14354/16.

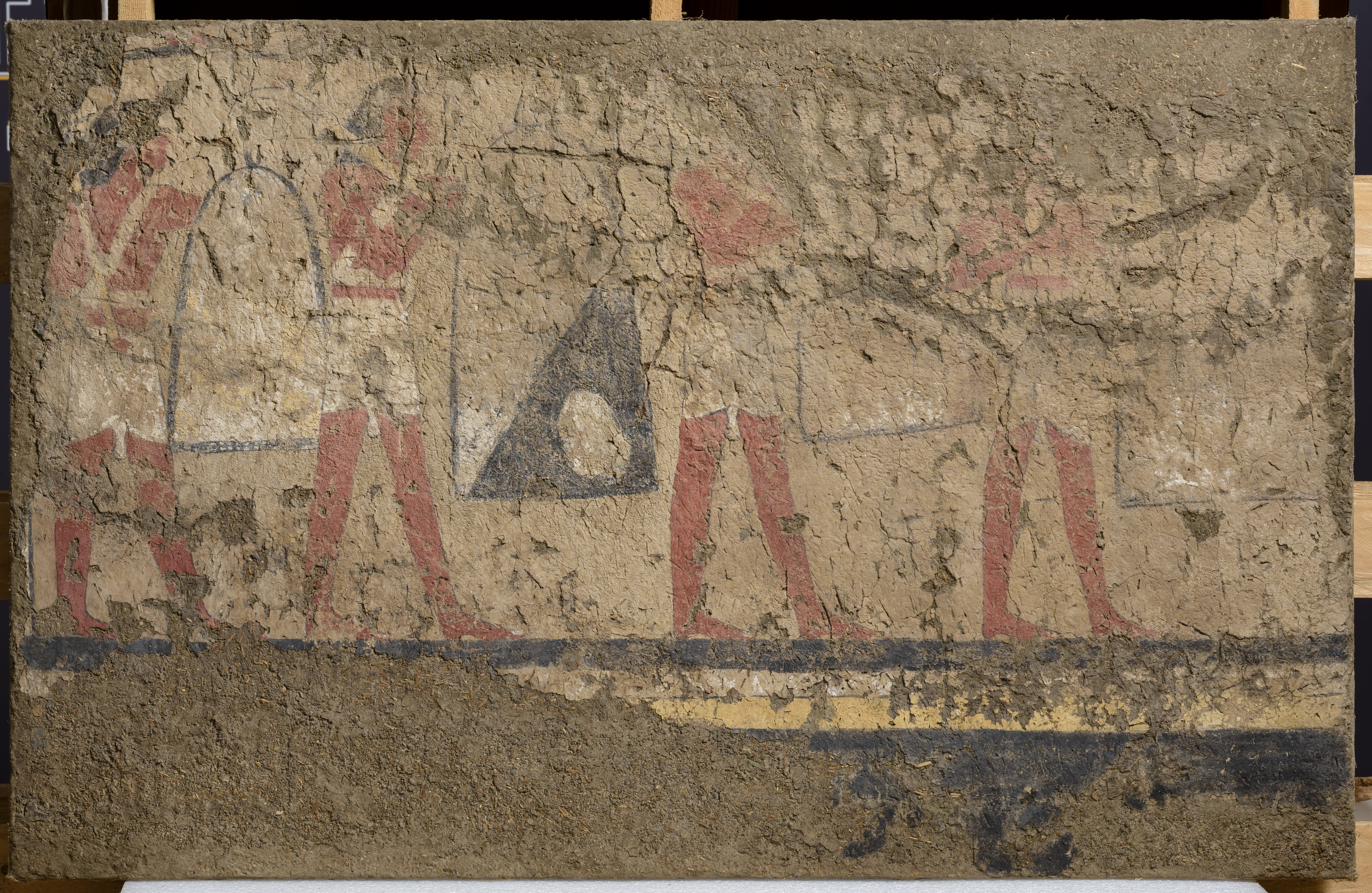
Wall painting showing four Nubians armed with shields, Museo Egizio, Turin, Suppl. 14354/21.

== Finds ==
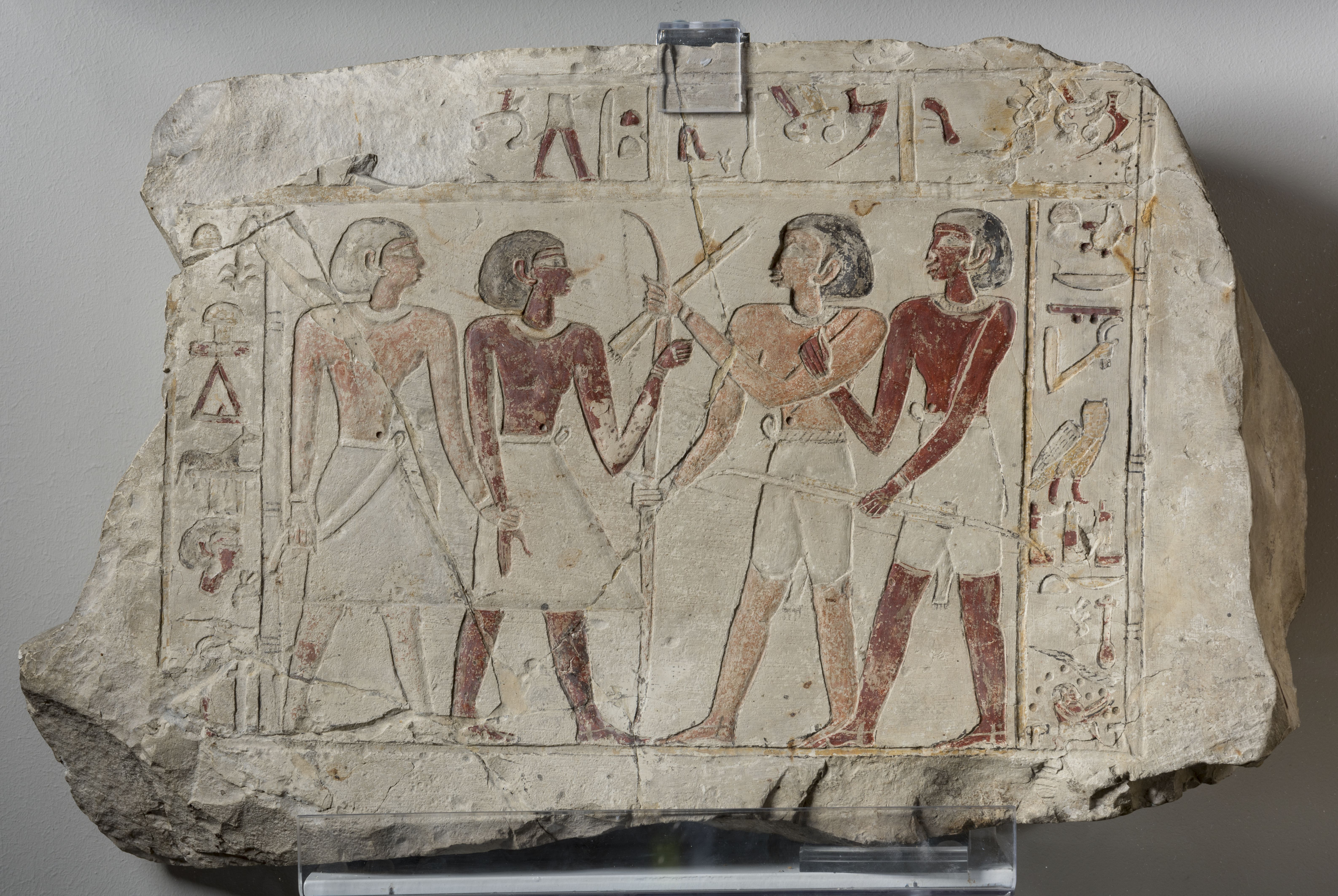
Stela showing two pairs of bowmen, limestone, Museo Egizio, Turin, Suppl. 13115.

The paintings detached from the tomb are preserved in the Museo Egizio in Turin. The same provenance also includes stelae, pottery, a shell, alabaster and terracotta vessels and other objects from the burial equipment.

Neferu's burial equipment included large terracotta jars, globular terracotta jars with lids, miniature terracotta vessels, black terracotta cylindrical jars and a cylindrical alabaster jar. Another photograph of the equipment records four large terracotta jars, two terracotta cups and a terracotta bowl.

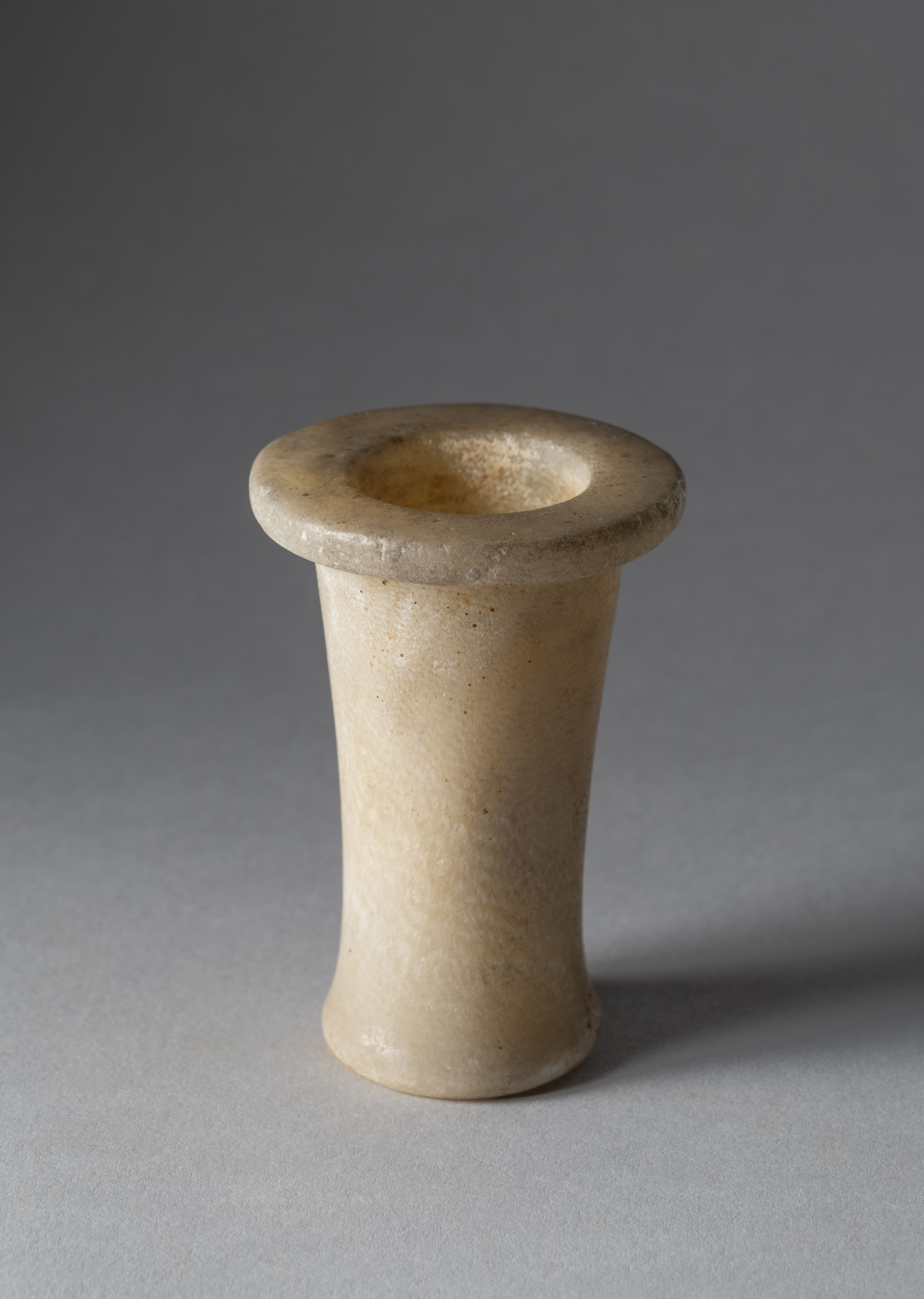
Cylindrical alabaster jar, Museo Egizio, Turin, Suppl. 13023.

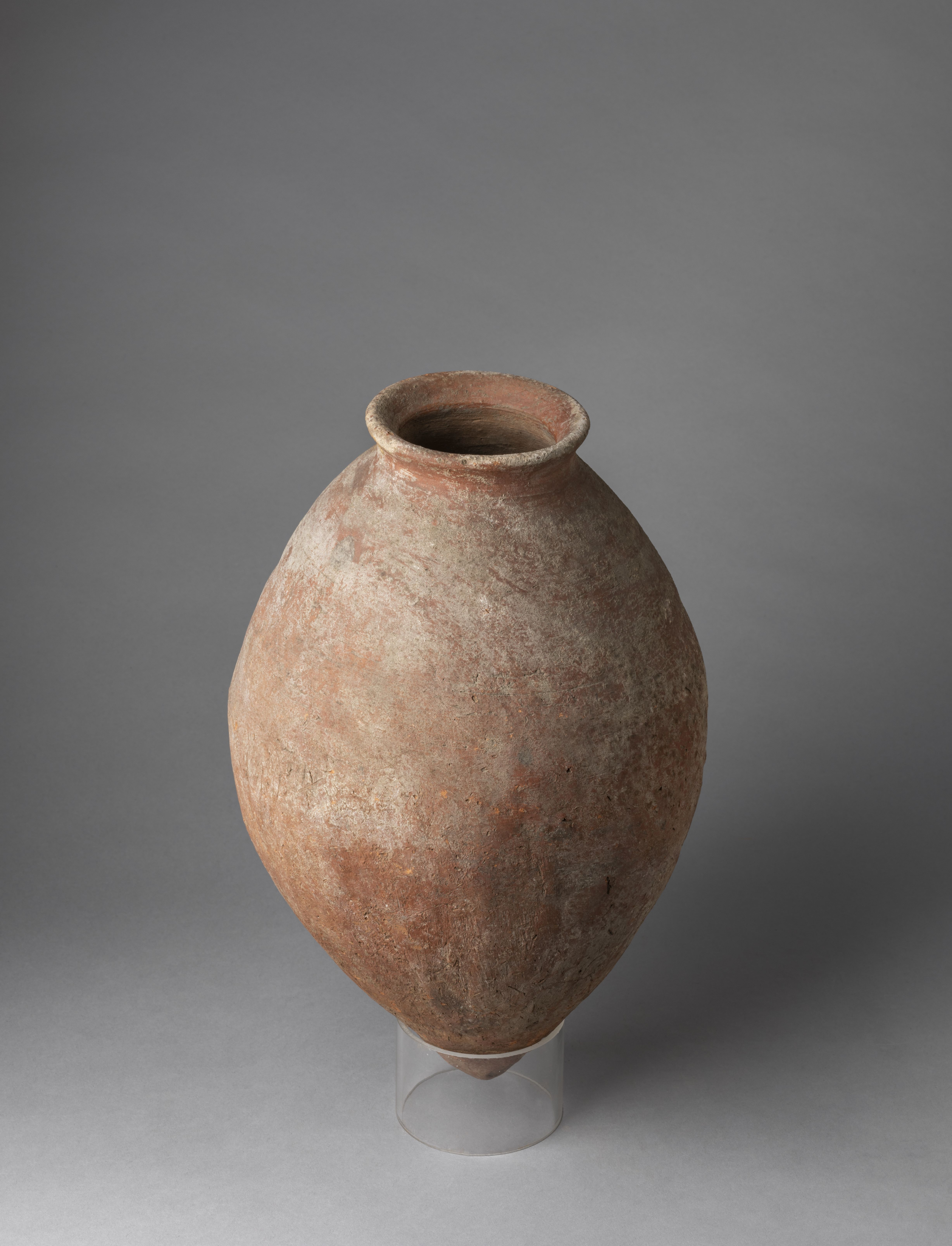
Clay and terracotta jar, Museo Egizio, Turin, Suppl. 13121.

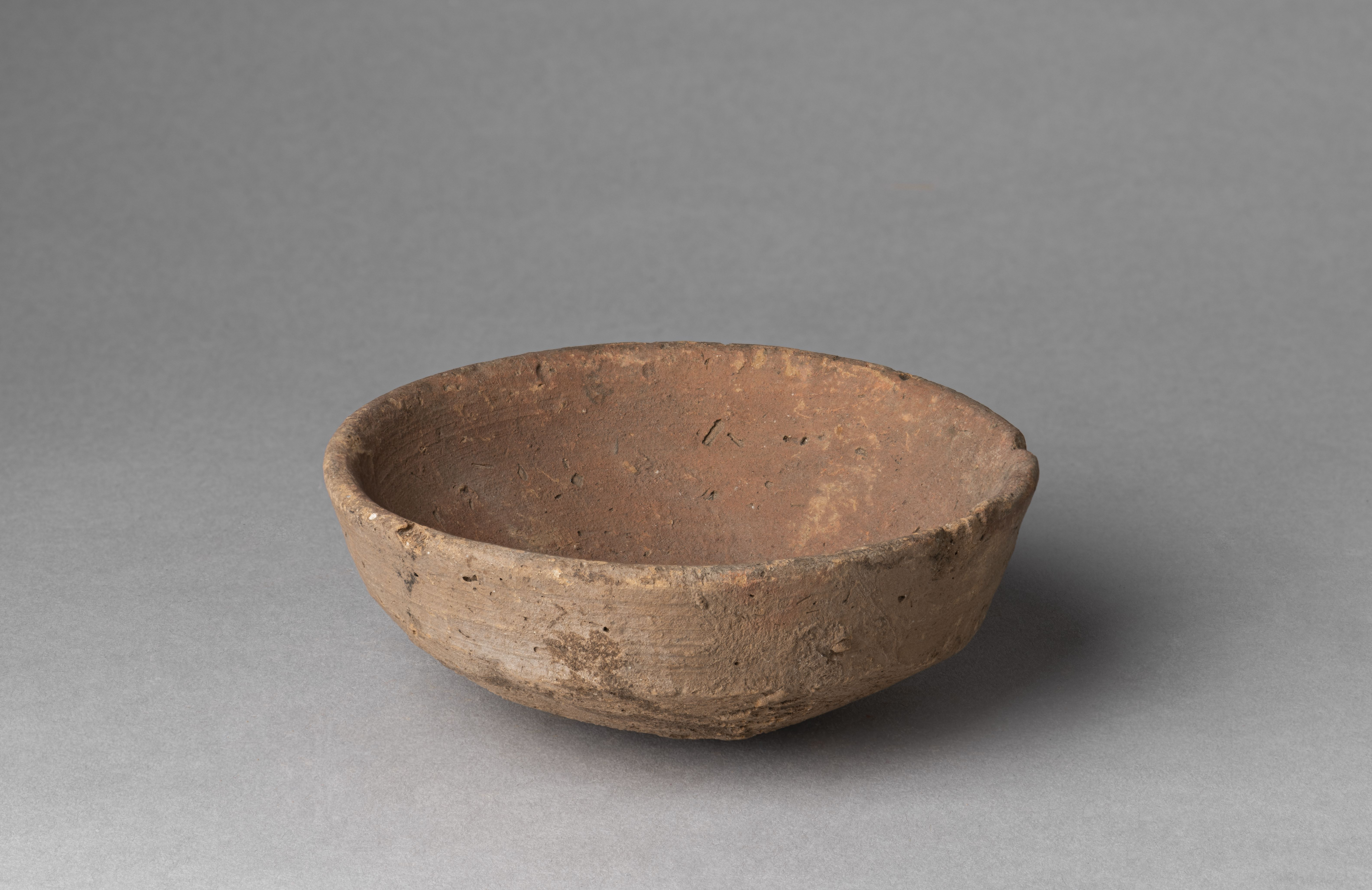
Clay bowl, Museo Egizio, Turin, Suppl. 13251.

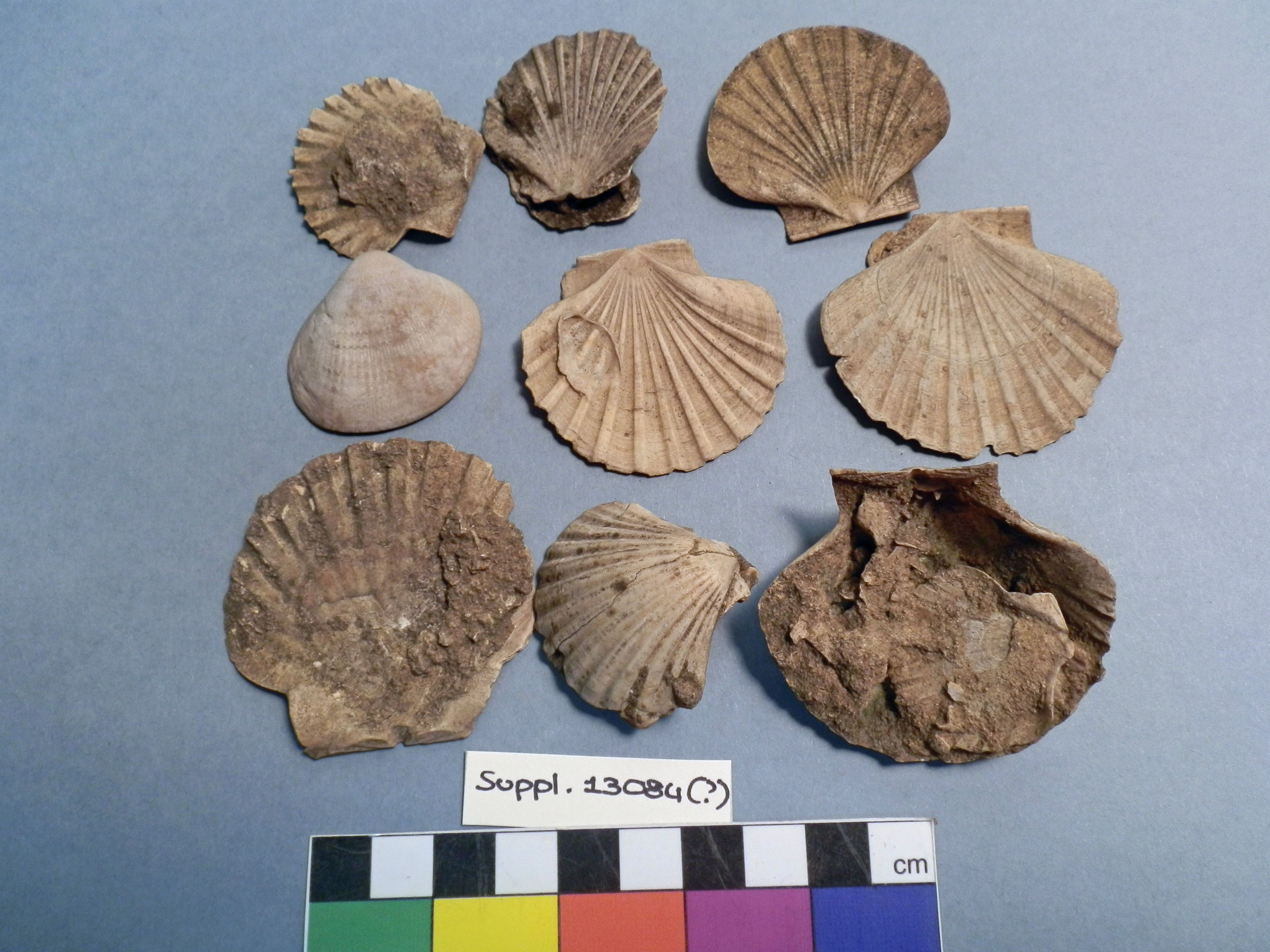
Shell, Museo Egizio, Turin, Suppl. 13084.

== Bibliography ==
- Cardinali, Michela; Cavalleri, Tiziana; Croveri, Paola; Greco, Christian; Moiso, Beppe; Piccirillo, Anna; Scarcella, Arianna V.; Triolo, Paolo (30 May 2019). "Enhance knowledge to improve conservation: the Iti and Neferu wall paintings" (PDF). Book of Abstracts. 5th BM-Mellon Symposium: A Closer Look at Murals: Recent Advances in the Conservation and Scientific Investigation of Wall Paintings. Stevenson Lecture Theatre, Clore Centre, The British Museum. pp. 69–70.
- Madden, Bianca (2022). "Wall Paintings Transfer: A Short History, and the Experience as Applied to Ancient Egyptian Paintings". British Museum Studies in Ancient Egypt and Sudan (26): 1–37.
- Moiso, Beppe; Montonati, Tommaso (2021). "L'Archivio Fotografico del Museo Egizio di Torino". Rivista del Museo Egizio (in Italian). 5. doi:10.29353/rime.2021.3897.
- Montonati, Tommaso (2018). "Two Ancient Egyptian Models in the Historical Photographic Archive of the Museo Egizio, Turin". Rivista del Museo Egizio. 2. doi:10.29353/rime.2018.1798.
- Schäfer, Heinrich (1974). Principles of Egyptian Art. Oxford: Oxford University Press.

== See also ==
- Ancient Egyptian funerary practices
- Djehutynakht (10A)
- El-Tarif
- First Intermediate Period of Egypt
- Gebelein
- Museo Egizio
- Tomb of Wah
- TT280
