= Sewadjare Mentuhotep =

Egyptian pharaoh

- Sewedjare Mentuhotep V
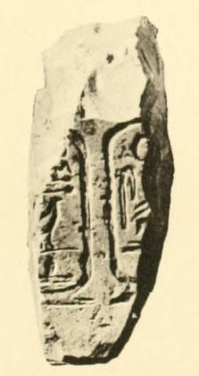
- Photography of a relief showing the cartouches of Sewadjare Mentuhotep from the mortuary temple of Mentuhotep II at Deir el-Bahri.

Pharaoh
- Reign: very short reign, some time between 1662 BC and 1649 BC, most probably 1655 BC
- Predecessor: unknown
- Successor: unknown
Royal titulary
Prenomen
Sewadjare
Swḏˁ-Rˁ

M23 X1 L2 X1	N5 s Aa21 D36
Nomen
Mentuhotep
Mn-ṯw-ḥtp
Montu is content

G39 N5	mn n V13 G43 R4
- Consort: Sitmut (?)
- Children: Herunefer (?)
- Dynasty: 13th Dynasty

Sewadjare Mentuhotep (also known as Mentuhotep V or Mentuhotep VI depending on the scholar) is a poorly attested Egyptian pharaoh of the late 13th Dynasty, who reigned for a short time c. 1655 BC during the Second Intermediate Period. The Egyptologists Kim Ryholt and Darrell Baker respectively believe that he was the fiftieth and forty-ninth king of the dynasty, thereby making him Mentuhotep V. Thus, Sewadjare Mentuhotep most likely reigned shortly before the arrival of Hyksos over the Memphite region and concurrently with the last rulers of the 14th Dynasty.

== Name ==
Ryholt, Baker and Jacques Kinnaer refer to Sewadjare Mentuhotep as Mentuhotep V because they believe that he lived at the very end of the 13th Dynasty. On the other hand, in his studies of the Second Intermediate Period, Jürgen von Beckerath leaves Sewadjare Mentuhotep's position within the 13th Dynasty completely undetermined, but names him Mentuhotep VI nonetheless.

== Attestations ==
Sewadjare Mentuhotep is a poorly attested pharaoh. Unfortunately, the Turin canon is severely damaged after the record of Sobekhotep VII and the identity and chronological order of the last nineteen kings of the 13th Dynasty are impossible to ascertain from the document. According to Nobert Dautzenberg and Ryholt, Mentuhotep's prenomen Sewadjare is nonetheless partially preserved on column 8, line 20 of the papyrus, which reads [...]dj[are].

The only contemporary attestation safely attributable to Sewadjare Mentuhotep V is a single fragment of a relief showing his cartouches. The relief was found in the ruins of the mortuary temple of Mentuhotep II during the excavation of Édouard Naville at the beginning of the 20th century.

== Coffin of Herunefer ==
Another possible attestation of Sewedjare Mentuhotep V is given by a fragment of a wooden coffin, now in the British Museum under the catalog number BM EA 29997. The coffin bears the following text:

The Patrician, Royal Representative, Eldest King's son, the Senior Commander Herunefer, true of voice, who was begotten by king Mentuhotep, true of voice, and borne by the senior Queen Sitmut.

The prenomen of the king Mentuhotep is missing and the identification of this Mentuhotep remains problematic. Kim Ryholt notes however that the coffin is also inscribed with an early version of passages of the Book of the Dead, which is one of only two pre-New Kingdom inscriptions of this text. Thus, Ryholt argues that this Mentuhotep must have reigned during the late Second Intermediate Period. Thus, three kings could possibly be the one mentioned on the coffin: Seankhenre Mentuhotepi, Merankhre Mentuhotep VI and Sewadjare Mentuhotep. Although it sounds similar to Mentuhotep, Ryholt has shown that Mentuhotepi is a different name than Mentuhotep and would therefore not have been reported as Mentuhotep. To decide between the two remaining kings, Ryholt notes that the other instance of the Book of the Dead is found on the coffin of queen Mentuhotep, wife of Djehuti, the second pharaoh of the 16th Dynasty who reigned c. 1645 BC. In this case, the text is almost identical to that found on Herunefer's coffin, which argues for a close proximity in time between the two. While Sewadjare Mentuhotep reigned c. 10 years before Djehuti, Merankhre Mentuhotep is believed to have reigned 60 years after him. Hence, Ryholt concludes that Sewadjare Mentuhotep is the Mentuhotep of the coffin, Sitmut his queen and Herunefer his son. This identification is far from certain however, and Aidan Dodson and Dyan Hilton have instead dated the coffin to the end of the 16th dynasty, thereby giving Herunefer as the son of Merankhre Mentuhotep VI.
