= Dedumose I =

Egyptian pharaoh

- Dudimose, Dudumesu
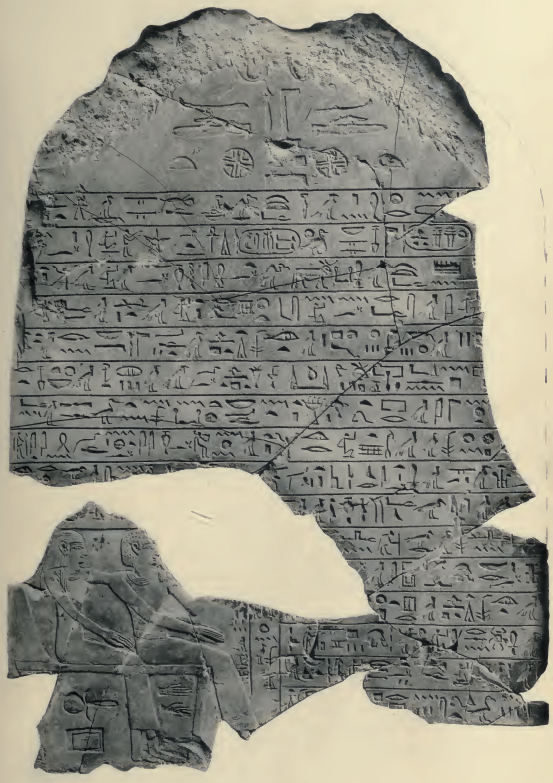
- Stele of Djedhotepre Dedumose I, 1908 photography by Alessandro Barsanti

Pharaoh
- Reign: 17th century BC or 16th century BC
- Predecessor: uncertain, Bebiankh (new arrangement), Djedankhre Montemsaf (J. Beckerath)
- Successor: Dedumose II
Royal titulary
Horus name
Wadjkhaw
W3ḏ-ḫˁ.w
Flourisihing of appearances
G5	wAD xa a
Nebty name
Shedtawy
Šd-t3.wj
He who rescues of the two lands
G16	Sd d tA tA
Golden Horus
Inihotep
Jnj-ḥtp
He who brings peace
G8	ini R4 t p
Prenomen
Djedhotepre
Ḏd-ḥtp-Rˁ
The peace of Ra is stable
M23 t L2 t < N5 R11 R11 R4 t p >
Nomen
Dedumose
Dd-msw
(A god) has fashioned him G39 N5 < D37 D37 F31 s w >
- Children: uncertain, possibly Dedumose II, Khonsuemwaset, Sobekhotep
- Dynasty: 16th Dynasty (Ryholt) or 13th Dynasty (J. von Beckerath)

Djedhotepre Dedumose I was an Egyptian pharaoh of the Second Intermediate Period. According to egyptologists Kim Ryholt, Darrell Baker, Aidan Dodson and Dyan Hilton, he was a king of the 16th Dynasty. Alternatively, Jürgen von Beckerath, Thomas Schneider and Detlef Franke see him as a king of the 13th Dynasty.

== Attestations ==
Djedhotepre Dedumose is mentioned on stela found in July 1908 in the southern part of the Tell of Edfu. The stele belongs to a king's son and commander Khonsuemwaset ("Khonsu is in Waset"). It is not known whether the latter was indeed the son of the king or if king's son is here only the title, which was not necessarily reserved to the actual children of a king. Another king of the Second Intermediate Period bears the name Dedumose: Djedneferre Dedumose II. Given the rarity of the name Dedumose, it is possible that he was the son of Dedumose I.

A number of artefacts name a king Dedumose but without providing the prenomen, it is difficult to decide to which Dedumose they belong. For example, a stela of an official Harsekher from Edfu states that the King's Son Harsekher, son of the King's Son Sobekhotep is related to a king Dedumose, which Aidan Dodson and Dyan Hilton identify as Dedumose I.

== Chronological position ==
Precise dates for Dedumose are unknown, but if he was a king of the 13th Dynasty, his reign probably ended around 1690 BC while if he was a king of the 16th Dynasty, he would possibly have reigned between 1588 BC and 1582 BC, in the final years of the 16th Dynasty. Ryholt believes that facing the invasion of his territory by the Hyksos, Dedumose tried to sue them for peace, as indicated by his names "The peace of Ra is stable; He who brings peace; He who rescues the Two Lands".
