= Djedankhre Montemsaf =

Theban king

- Montuemsaf, Mentemsaf, Mentuemsaf
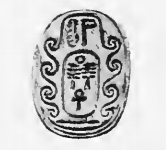
- Steatite scarab of pharaoh Djedankhre Montemsaf reading "The good god, Djedankhre", now in the Petrie Museum UC11225.

Pharaoh
- Reign: uncertain, ca. 1590 BC
- Predecessor: uncertain, Dedumose II
- Successor: uncertain, Mentuhotep VI
Royal titulary
Prenomen
Djedankhre
Ḏd-ˁnḫ-Rˁ
Enduring of life like Ra
M23 t L2 t < N5 R11 S34 >
Variant: Djedankhre
Ḏd-ˁnḫ-Rˁ
M23 t L2 t < N5 R11 R11 S34 >
Nomen
Montuemsaf
Mn-tw-m-s3-f
Montu is his protection
G39 N5 < mn n t w m V16 f >
- Burial: unknown, probably in Dra' Abu el-Naga'
- Dynasty: 16th Dynasty

Djedankhre Montemsaf was a Theban king of the 16th Dynasty based in Upper Egypt during the Second Intermediate Period c. 1590 BC. As such, he would have ruled concurrently with the 15th Dynasty, which controlled Lower and Middle Egypt.

== Attestations ==
=== Gebelein ===
Djedankhre Montemsaf is attested by an inscribed block found in Gebelein.

=== Unknown Provenance ===
A bronze axe-blade of unknown origin, now in the British Museum, and bearing "The good god Djedankhre, given life".

=== Scarabs ===
Two scarab seals of unknown provenance: Scarab BM EA 40687 and Scarab Petrie Museum UC 11225

=== King Lists ===
Djedankhre Montemsaf is not attested on the surviving fragments of the Turin canon, his reign and those of four other kings of the end of the 16th Dynasty being lost in a lacuna. For this reason, the exact chronological position as well as the length of his reign cannot be ascertained.

== Speculations ==
=== Dynasty 13 ===
An older study by Jürgen von Beckerath places Djedankhre Montemsaf in the 13th Dynasty, following Mentuhotep VI and succeeded by Dedumose I on the throne.

=== Dynasty 16 ===
According to the new arrangement of kings of the Second Intermediate Period and Kim Ryholt, Djedankhre Montemsaf succeeded Djedneferre Dedumose II and preceded Merankhre Mentuhotep VI on the throne. He was thus a king of the late 16th Dynasty and may have reigned ca. 1590 BC. The arguments supporting this chronological position are: 1) the form of his prenomen Ḏd-X-Rˁ, which is in common with those of Dedumose I and Dedumose II; 2) the location of finds attesting Montemsaf in Thebes and the south; and 3) the style of the axe-blade which can be dated to the late Second Intermediate Period.
