= Sumenu =

Ancient Egyptian town

Coordinates: 25°31′48″N 32°27′27″E

z mn n t niwt or z mn n t niwt
smn(t)
in hieroglyphs
Era: Ptolemaic dynasty
(305–30 BC)

Sumenu or Smenu (Egyptian: S(w)mnw) was an ancient Egyptian town in Upper Egypt. It housed the most prominent early-Middle Kingdom sanctuary of the crocodile-god Sobek.

== Identification ==
G38 G38 G38 niwt
smnw
in hieroglyphs

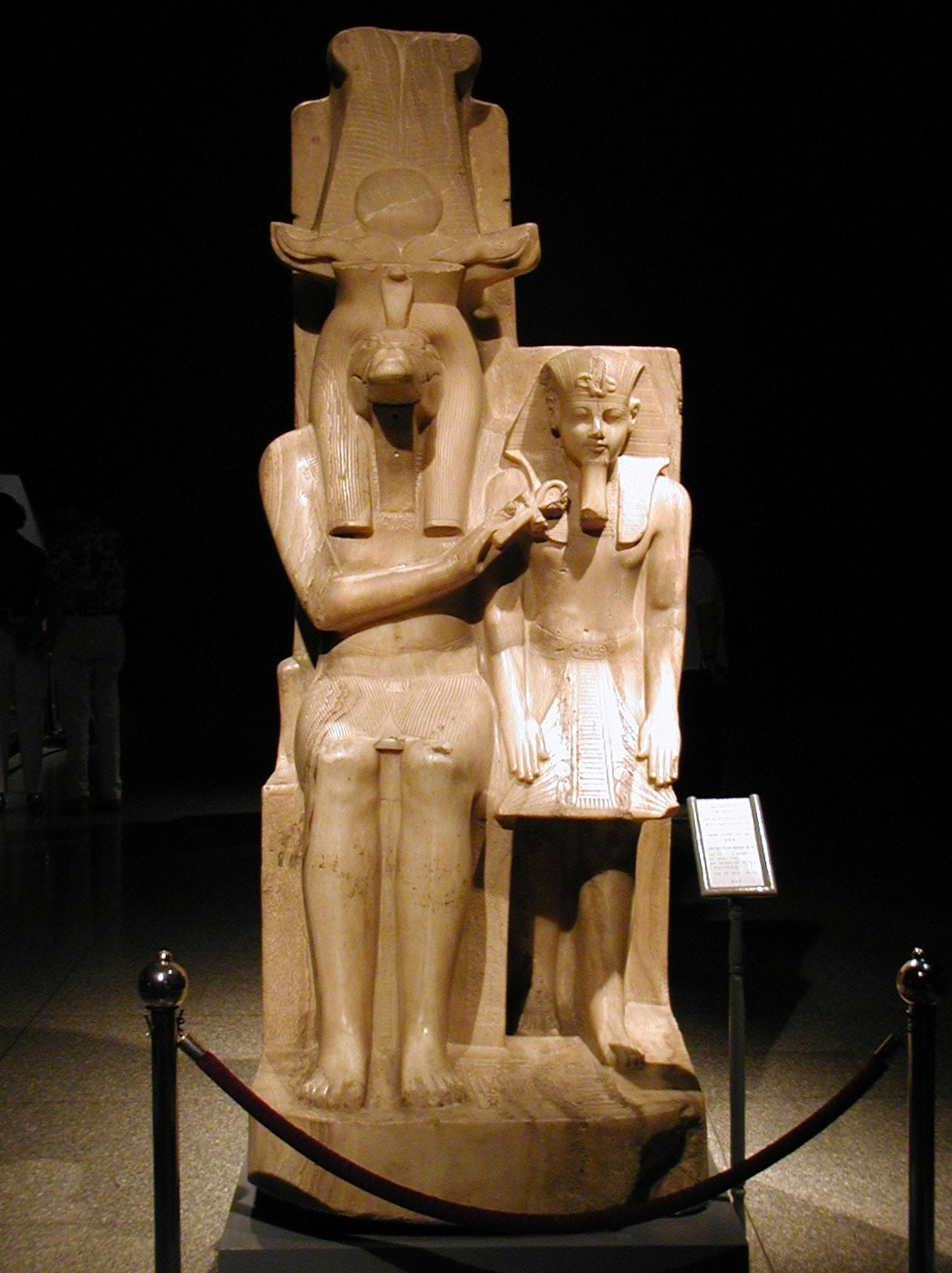
Pair statue of Sobek and Amenhotep III, once housed in the temple of Sobek at Sumenu, and unearthed in the near village of Dahamsha

Uncertainties about the exact location of the city—tentatively identified with Gebelein or with Rizeiqat, the latter suggested by Gaston Maspero—seem to have been resolved thanks to archaeological excavations started in the late 1960s, which identified Sumenu with the village of Awlad Mekky Dahmash south of the modern town of Al-Mahamid Qibly, between Armant and Gebelein.

It is almost certain that Sumenu is to be identified with Imiotru (Ancient Egyptian: ʼIwmìtrw) and thus also with the Crocodilopolis (Ancient Greek: Κροκοδείλων πόλις), which was distinct from the one in the Faiyum and, according to Strabo's Geographica, was between Hermonthis (Armant) and Aphroditopolis (Gebelein). It appears most likely that Sumenu was the toponym where the temple stood, while Imiotru/Crocodilopolis referred to the whole city; in later times, the "Sumenu" denomination became obsolete.

== History ==
Earliest attestations of Sumenu date to the 11th Dynasty, and consist in references to a temple of "Sobek, lord of Sumenu", indirectly attesting that such a temple existed at the time. Jean Yoyotte suggested that the flourishing of the cult of Sobek during the Middle Kingdom was due to the Theban origin of the 12th Dynasty pharaohs rather than their interest in the Faiyum region with which Sobek was later associated. In fact, objects referring to Sobek of Sumenu became quite common during the early Middle Kingdom, and only under Amenemhat III did the cult of Sobek at Sumenu lose its appeal in favor of "Sobek of Shedet", the Greek Krokodeilópolis, northward in Faiyum.

The temple survived into the New Kingdom, when several pharaohs of the 18th Dynasty ordered works there, then gradually phased out. Soon after 88 BCE, the temple was demolished and its materials reused in the nearby city of el-Tod.
