= Dedumose II =

Ancient Egyptian pharaoh

- Dudimose, Tutimaios
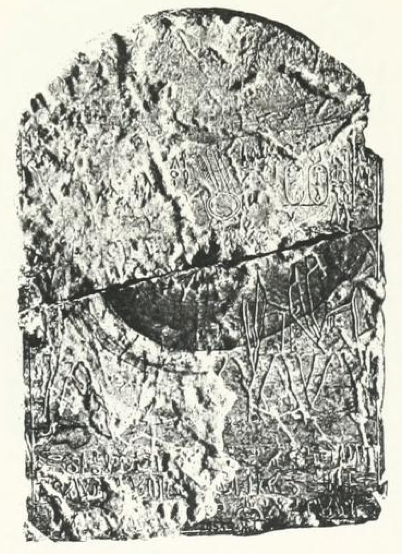
- Stele CG 20533 of Djedneferre Dedumose II from Gebelein.

Pharaoh
- Reign: some time between 1588 BC and 1582 BC (Ryholt)
- Predecessor: Dedumose I?
- Successor: Djedankhre Montemsaf?
Royal titulary
Prenomen
Djedneferre
Ḏd-nfr-Rˁ
Enduring and perfect is Ra< ra Dd nfr >
Turin canon:
[…]mose, column 8 line 22
< HASH ms s Z5 > G7
Nomen
Dedumose
Dd-msw
[A god] has fashioned/given him
G39 N5 < D37 D37 ms s w >
- Father: Dedumose I?
- Dynasty: 16th Dynasty (Ryholt, Baker) or 13th Dynasty (von Beckerath, Schneider, Franke)

Djedneferre Dedumose II was an ancient Egyptian pharaoh of the Second Intermediate Period. According to egyptologists Kim Ryholt and Darrell Baker, he was a ruler of the Theban 16th Dynasty. Alternatively, Jürgen von Beckerath, Thomas Schneider and Detlef Franke see him as a king of the 13th Dynasty.

== Dating issues ==
Williams and others place Dedumose as the last king of Egypt's 13th Dynasty. Precise dates for Dedumose are unknown, but according to the commonly accepted Egyptian chronology his reign probably ended around 1690 BC.

== Attestations ==
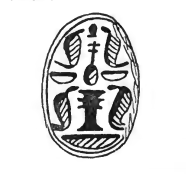
A scarab bearing the name "Djedneferre", considered by Flinders Petrie as a reference to Dedumose II

Djedneferre Dedumose II is known from a stela originally from Gebelein which is now in the Cairo Museum (CG 20533). On the stela Dedumose claims to have been raised for kingship, which may indicate he is a son of Dedumose I, although the statement may also merely be a form of propaganda. The martial tone of the stela probably reflects the constant state of war of the final years of the 16th Dynasty, when the Hyksos invaded its territory:

The good god, beloved of Thebes; The one chosen by Horus, who increases his [army], who has appeared like the lightning of the sun, who is acclaimed to the kingship of both lands; The one who belongs to shouting.

Ludwig Morenz believes that the above excerpt of the stele, in particular "who is acclaimed to the kingship", may confirm the controversial idea of Eduard Meyer that certain pharaohs were elected to office.

== As Josephus' Timaios ==
Dedumose is usually linked to Timaios mentioned by the historian Josephus – who was quoting Manetho – as a king during whose reign an army of Asiatic foreigners subdued the country without a fight.

The introductory phrase in Josephus' quotation of Manetho του Τιμαιος ονομα appears somewhat ungrammatical and following A. von Gutschmid, the Greek words του Τιμαιος ([genitive definite article] Timaios [nominative]) is often combined into the proposed name Τουτιμαιος (Tutimaios) based on the tenuous argument of von Gutschmid that this sounded like Tutmes i.e. Thutmose. This has influenced the transliteration of the name Dedumose as Dudimose in order to reinforce the resemblance but this transliteration is not justified by the hieroglyphic spelling of the name. Nevertheless Dedumose did rule either as a Pharaoh of the 13th dynasty which preceded the Hyksos or as part of the 16th dynasty contemporaneous with the early Hyksos and the actual form Timaios in the manuscript of Josephus still plausibly represents his name. Whiston's translation of Josephus understands the phrase to mean “[There was a king] of ours (του), whose name was Timaios (Τιμαιος ονομα)." A. Bülow-Jacobsen has suggested however that the phrase in Josephus may have been derived via a series of (unattested) scribal errors from του πραγματος ("of the matter") and that ονομα ("this is a name", typically left out of translations) is a later gloss whence the original text of Josephus did not contain the name of a Pharaoh at all.

== Fringe theories ==
There have been revisionistic attempts by the historian Immanuel Velikovsky and Egyptologist David Rohl to identify Dedumose II as the Pharaoh of the Exodus, much earlier than the mainstream candidates. Rohl, in particular, attempted to change views on Egyptian history by shortening the Third Intermediate Period of Egypt by almost 300 years. As a by-result the synchronisms with the biblical narrative have changed, making Dedumose the pharaoh of the Exodus. Rohl's theory, however, has failed to find support among most scholars in his field.

Between the 18th and 19th century, Francis Wilford claimed that Josephus' account is reportedly mentioned on an Indian text concerning an Egyptian tale, in which the Pharaoh's name appears as Tamovatsa.

Preceded by Dedumose I?	Pharaoh of Egypt; Sixteenth Dynasty	Succeeded by Djedankhre Montemsaf?
