= Thomas Schneider (Egyptologist) =

German Egyptologist (born 1964)

- Born: 6 September 1964 (age 62); Gottingen, West Germany

Academic background
- Education: University of Basel (PhD)

Academic work
- Discipline: Egyptology
- Institutions: University of Vienna; University of Warsaw; University of Heidelberg; Institute of Egyptology; University of Wales; University of British Columbia

Thomas Schneider (born 6 September 1964) is a German Egyptologist.

== Life and career ==
Thomas Schneider began his studies in 1984 at the University of Zurich, focusing on history, Egyptology and Hebrew. He transferred to the University of Basel in 1986, where he achieved a MA in Egyptology, Ancient History, and Old Testament Studies in 1990. He carried out further study at the Collège de France in Paris before completing his PhD in Egyptology at the University of Basel in 1996. In 1999, he completed his habilitation at the same university.

Thomas Schneider became the professor of Egyptology at the University of Wales, Swansea. Before that, he was a visiting professor at the universities of Vienna, Warsaw and Heidelberg, professor of the National Swiss Research Association at the Institute of Egyptology at Basel and participated in the MISR Project (Mission Siptah-Ramses X in the Valley of the Kings) of the University of Basel. Since 2007, he has been an associate professor of Egyptology and the Near East at the University of British Columbia.

== Area of research ==
Since 1987, Thomas Schneider has pursued various research interests focussed on Egypt. His main areas of research are the political, cultural and intellectual history of Egypt, the relationship of ancient Egypt to the Near East, North Africa and the Aegean, the phonology of ancient Egyptian, connections between ancient Egyptian and the Afro-Asiatic languages, and the history of Egyptology.

== Selected publications ==
- Schneider, Thomas (1992). "Asiatische Personennamen in ägyptischen Quellen des Neuen Reiches" [Asiatic personal names in Egyptian Sources of the New Kingdom]. Orbis Biblicus et Orientalis. 114. doi:10.5167/uzh-139695.
- Ausländer in Ägypten während des Mittleren Reiches und der Hyksoszeit. Teil 1: Die ausländischen Könige [Outlanders in Egypt during the Middle Kingdom and the Hyksos period. Part 1: The Outlander Kings]. Ägypten und Altes Testament. Vol. 42. Wiesbaden: Harrassowitz. 1998. ISBN 3-447-04049-1.
- Schneider, Thomas (1998). Ausländer in Ägypten während des Mittleren Reiches und der Hyksoszeit: Die ausländische Bevölkerung [Outlanders in Egypt during the Middle Kingdom and the Hyksos period. Part 2: The Outlander Populations]. Ägypten und Altes Testament. Vol. 42. ISBN 9780344749063.
- Schneider, Thomas; Raulwing, Peter (8 November 2012). "Ägyptologen im Dritten Reich. Biographische Notizen anhand der sogenannten "Steindorff-Liste"." [Egyptologists in the Third Reich. Biographical Notices based on the So-Called "Steindorff List"]. Egyptology from the First World War to the Third Reich: Ideology, Scholarship, and Individual Biographies. Leiden: Brill. pp. 120–247. ISBN 978-90-04-24329-3.
