= Gebelein =

Village and archaeological site in Egypt

- الجبلين (Egyptian Arabic)
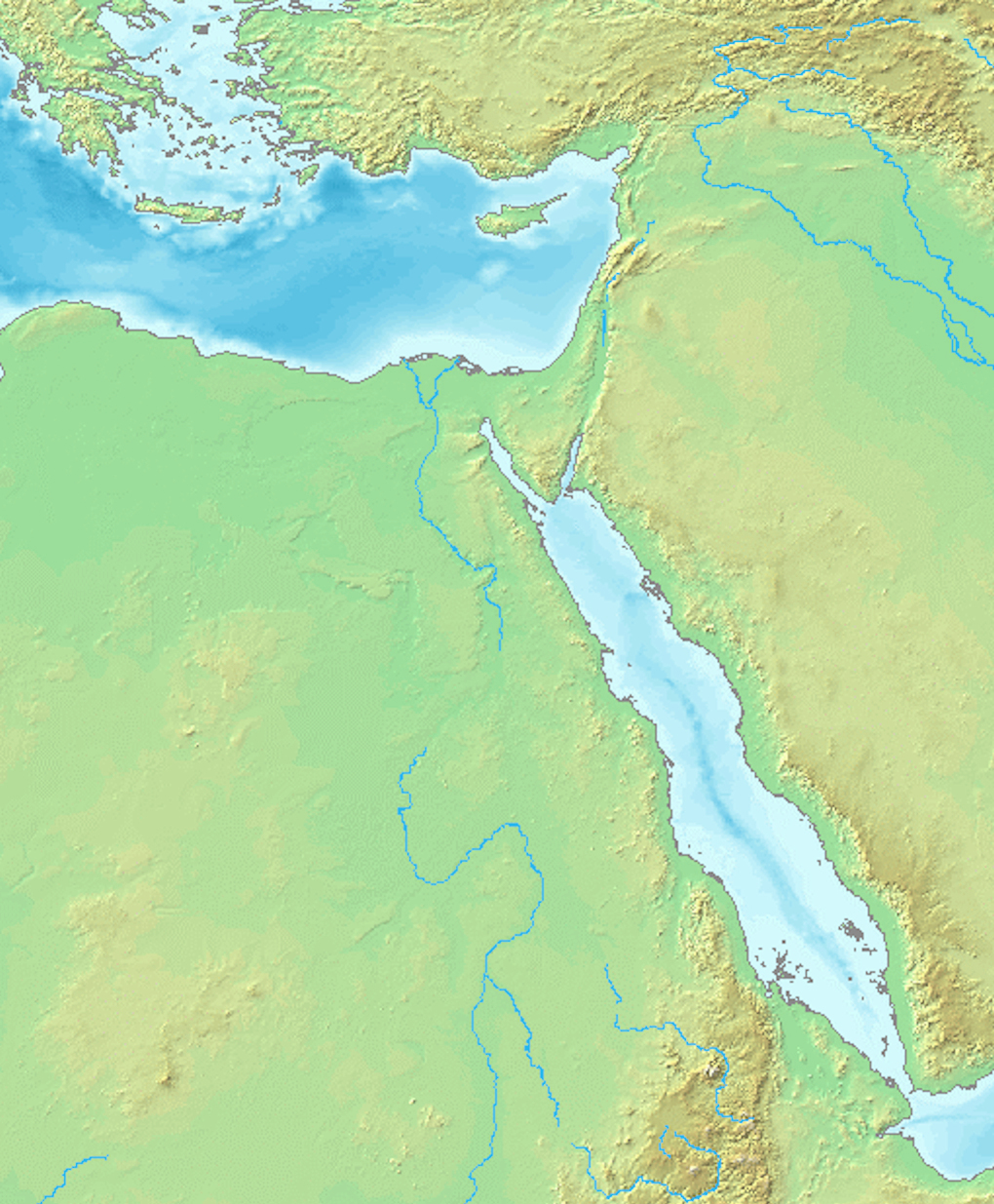
- Location within Northeast Africa Location within Egypt
- 25°29′00″N 32°29′00″E
- Location: Egypt
- Region: Esna-Luxor Governorate

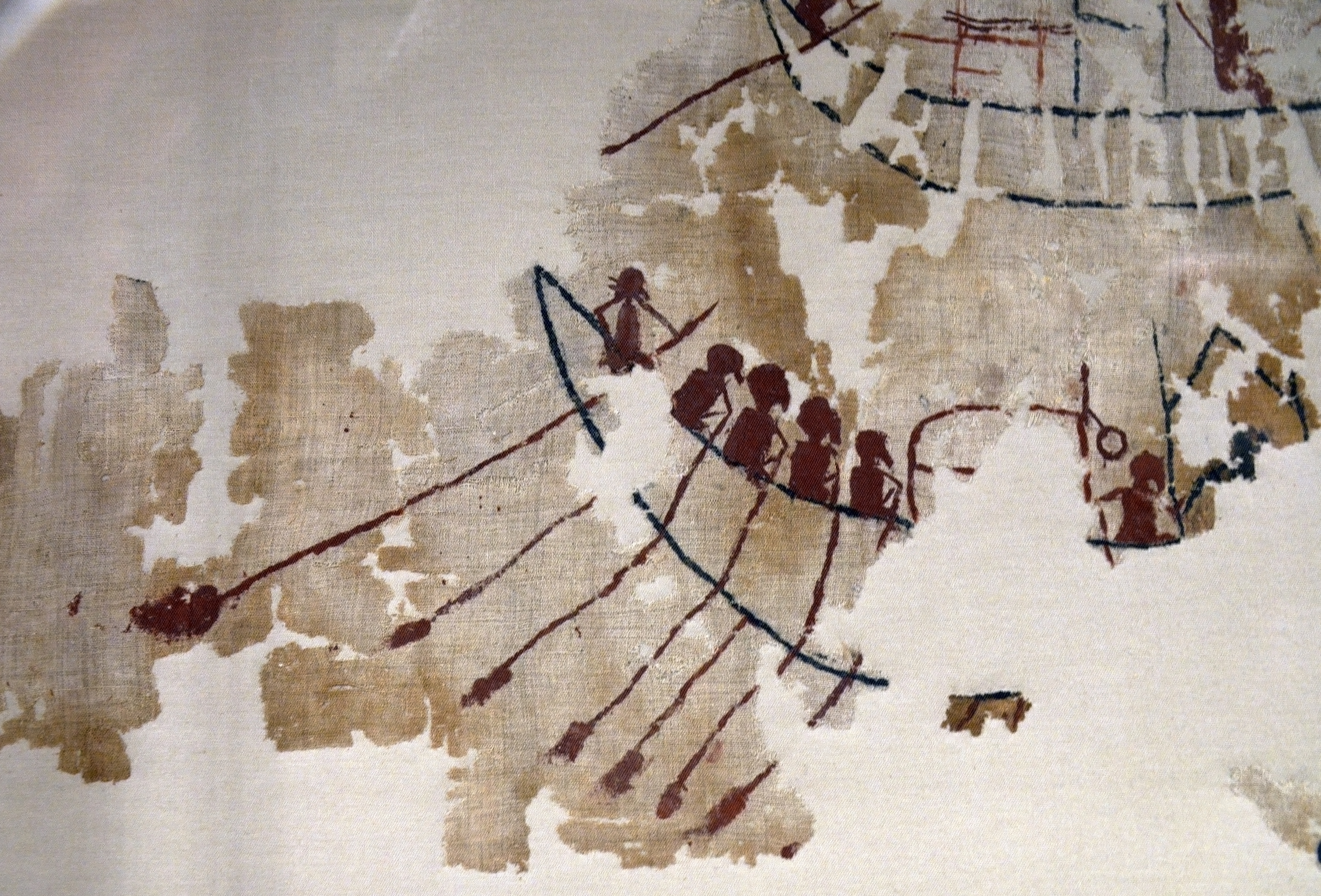
Painted linen (detail) from a grave in Gebelein, Naqada IIa-b (circa 3600 BC). Museo Egizio, Turin.

Gebelein (Egyptian Arabic: الجبلين, Two Mountains; Egyptian: Inerty or Per-Hathor; Ancient Greek: Παθυρις Pathuris or Ἀφροδιτόπολις Aphroditópolis; Latin: Pathyris or Aphroditopolis) is an archaeological site and former town in Egypt. It is located on the Nile, about 40 km south of Thebes, in the New Valley Governorate.

The modern geographic area is known as Naga el-Gherira (Egyptian Arabic: الغريرة).

== Archaeology ==
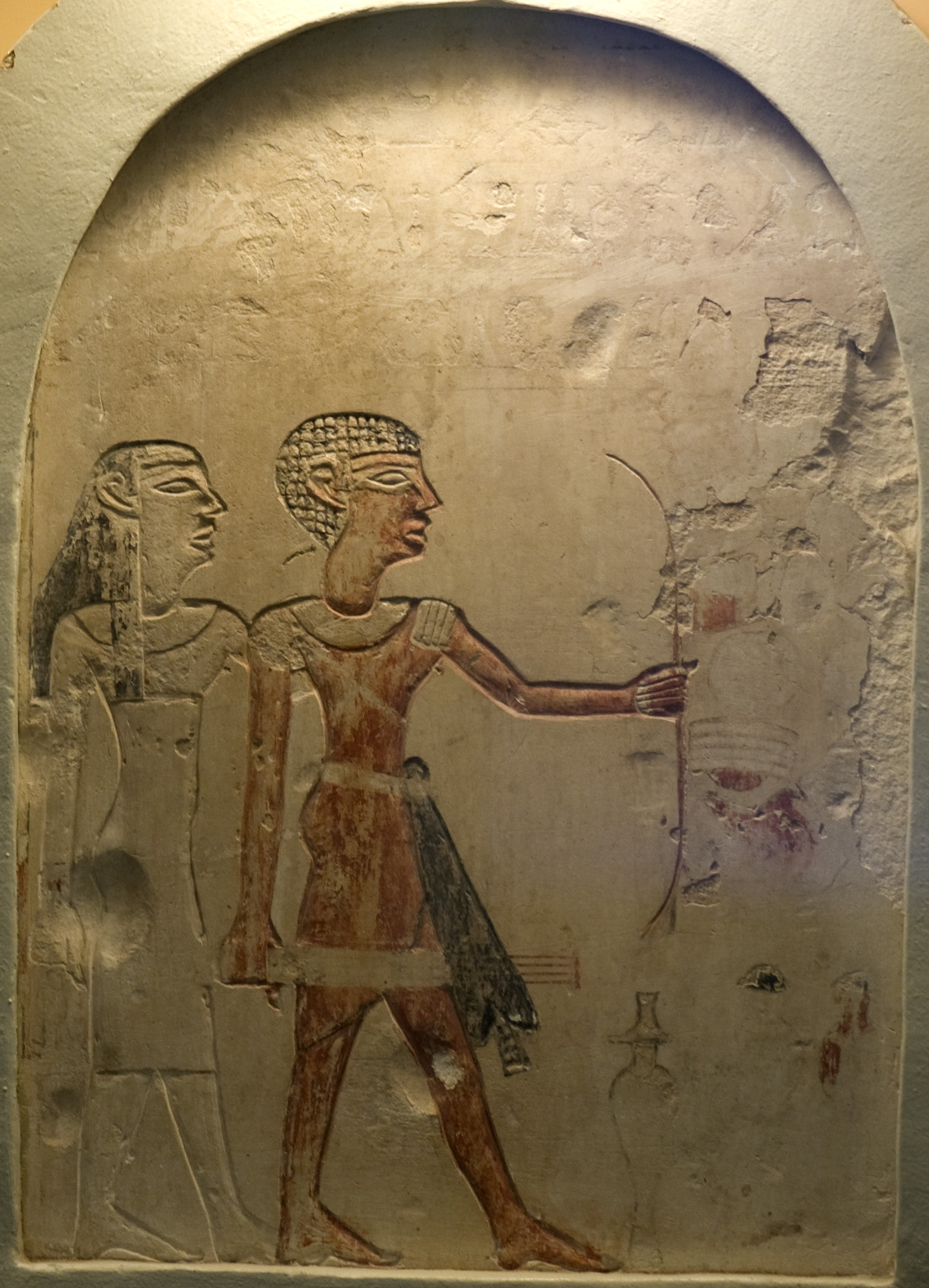
Gebelein stela of a mercenary. Dated to 2134-2040 BC.

| i n r t y O39 O39 jnr.tj "The Two Rocks" in hieroglyphs Era: New Kingdom (1550–1069 BC) | pr Hwt t Hr r G5 pr ḥwt-ḥr "House of Hathor" in hieroglyphs Era: New Kingdom (1550–1069 BC) | pr Z1 O10 t niwt pr ḥwt-ḥr "House of Hathor" in hieroglyphs Era: Ptolemaic dynasty (305–30 BC) |

Gebelein is known for its cemetery, where archeological finds stretching from the Predynastic Period to the Middle Kingdom have been made. Archaeological interest in the town started in the early 18th century AD and was included in Benoît de Maillet's Description de l'Egypte. As well as official excavations, many artifacts from the site were traded on the antiquities market and can be found in the museums of Turin, Cairo, Berlin, Lyons, and the British Museum.

=== Predynastic mummies ===
The Gebelein predynastic mummies are six naturally mummified bodies, dating to approximately 3400 BC from the Late Predynastic period of Egypt, and were the first complete pre-dynastic bodies to be discovered. The well-preserved bodies were excavated at the end of the nineteenth century by Wallis Budge, the British Museum Keeper for Egyptology, from shallow sand graves near Gebelein (modern name Naga el-Gherira) in the Egyptian desert.

A Pre-dynastic mummified body dated to 3400 BC, excavated from this site, has been on display in the British Museum since 1901.

=== Temple of Hathor ===
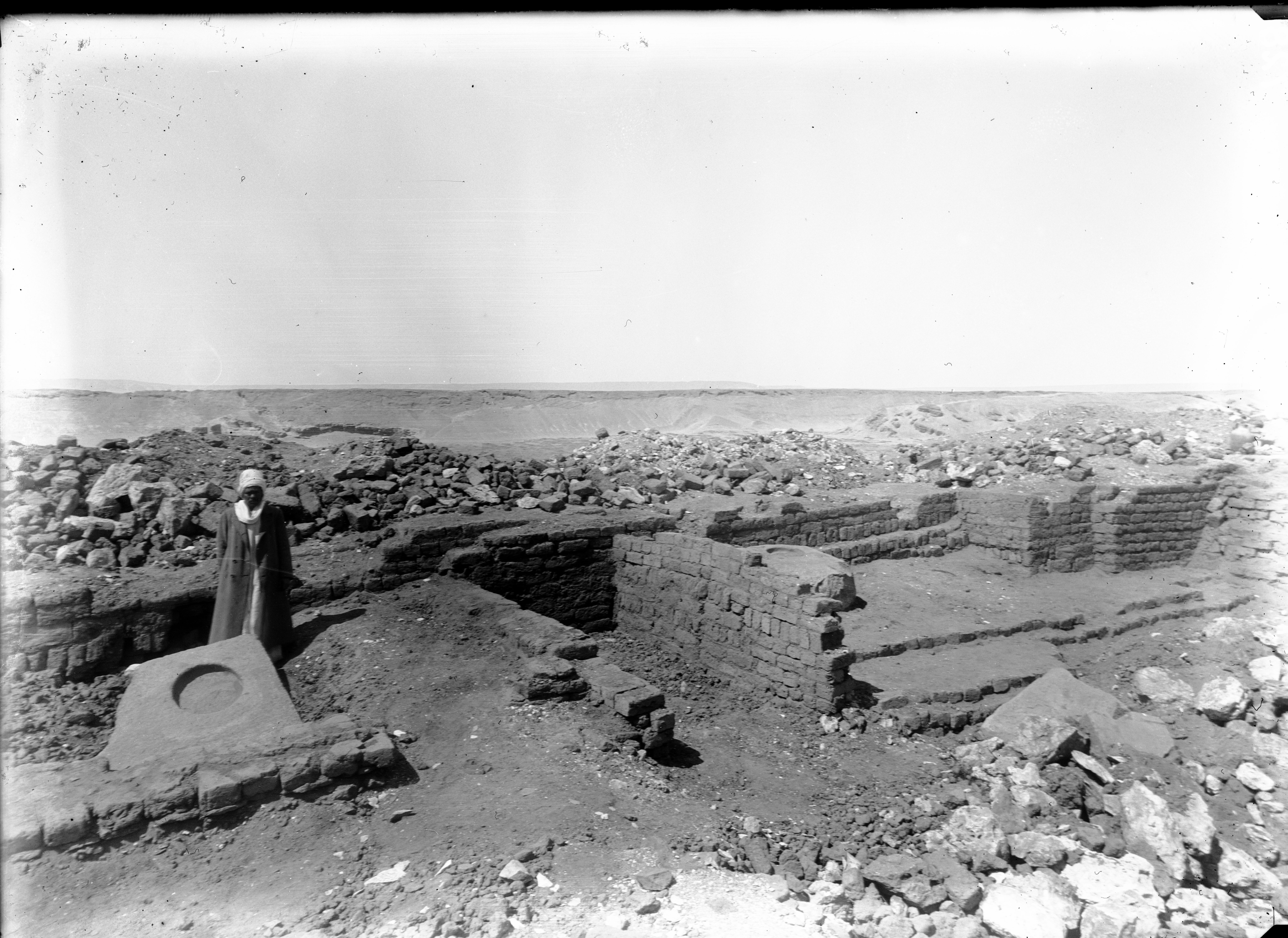
Summit of the southern hill in Gebelein, remains of the temple dedicated to the goddess Hathor. Two stone column bases are visible. In the background, the northern hill. Schiaparelli excavations, 1910.

The site includes the remains from a temple to Hathor with a number of cartouches on mud bricks and a royal stela from the Second to Third Dynasties. The temple is located on the east hill of the site. Items of several Second Intermediate Period rulers include a stele of Dedumose II, a block of Djedankhre Montemsaf, and a stela of a ruler named Sekhemtawy. Hyksos rulers mentioned are Apophis (on a lintel) and Khyan (on a black granite block).

Later period finds include a brick naming the High Priest of Amun Menkheperre and his wife Isetemkheb. The brick likely came from the Fort that enclosed the temple. From the Ptolemaic period came fragments of a statue of Ptolemy VIII Euergetes II Limestone fragments from the shrine that would have held the statue were also found.

=== Ptolemaic period military camp ===
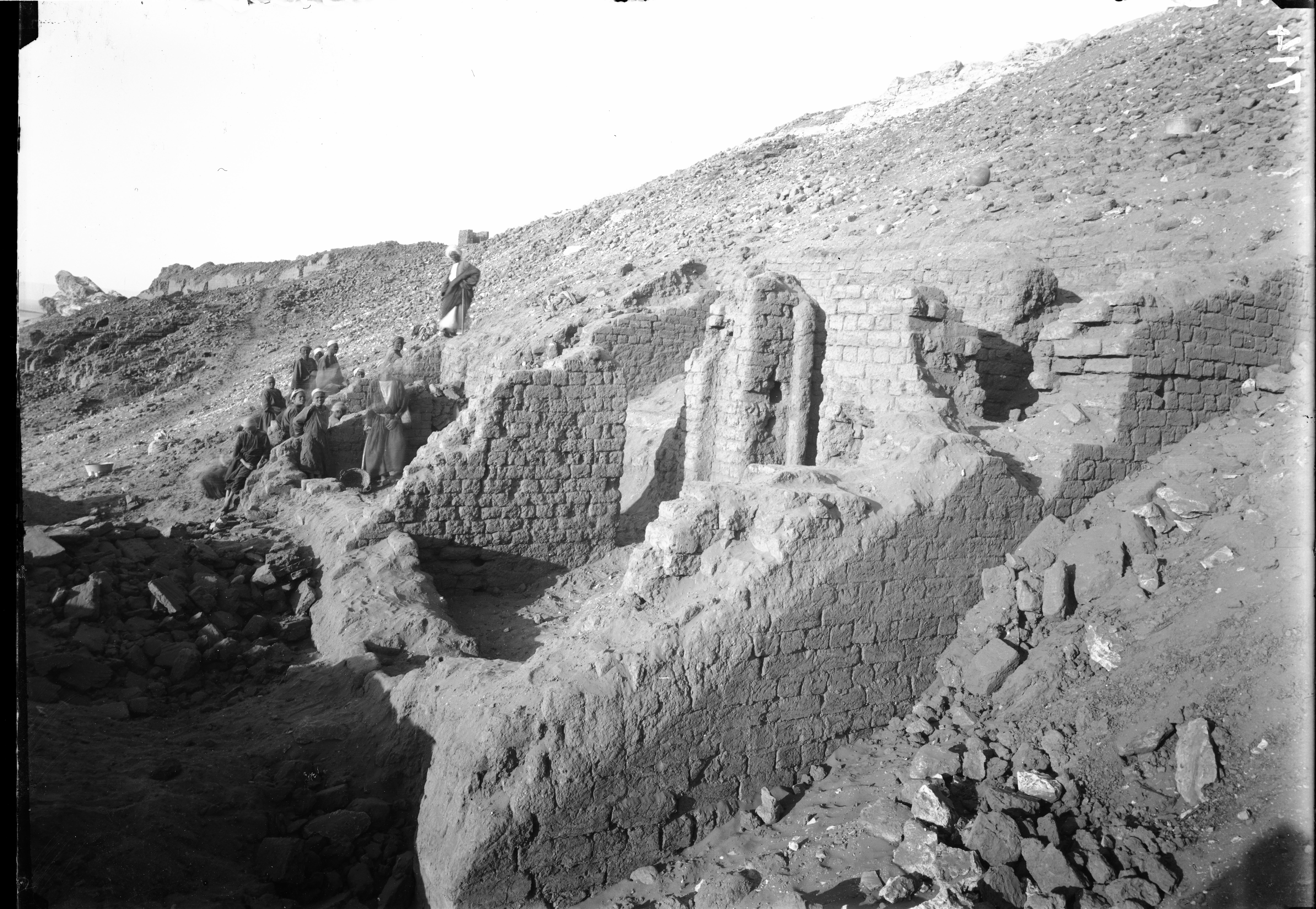
Excavations along the slopes on the western side of the southern hill of Gebelein. Significant constructions brought to light, perhaps related to the nearby storage houses or a logistical support point for the personnel connected to the fortress. Ernesto Schiaparelli excavations, 1910.

During the reign of Ptolemy VI Philometor, a military camp was established at Gebelein after the Theban rebellion of 186 B.C. The camp was destroyed by rebel forces 88 BC and the site was never again inhabited on a larger scale. Several hundred Demotic and Greek papyri and ostraca pertaining to the soldiers and the local temple were found at the ruins between 1890 and 1930. These including the archive of the mercenary Horos son of Nechoutes and the Dryton and Apollonia Archive.

=== Northern necropolis ===
The northern necropolis also included the Tomb of Iti and Neferu, a semi-rock-cut First Intermediate Period tomb whose wall paintings and burial equipment are now mainly preserved in the Museo Egizio in Turin.
