= Senebhenaf =

Egyptian vizier

- Vizier of Egypt
Egyptian name
s n b V28 n D36 f
Snb-ḥnʿf
- Dynasty: 16th Dynasty(?)
- Pharaoh: Djehuti
- Spouse: Sobekhotep
- Children: Mentuhotep

Senebhenaf was an ancient Egyptian vizier during the Second Intermediate Period.

Senebhenaf is known from the coffin of his daughter, queen Mentuhotep; the inscriptions state that her father was Senebhenaf and her mother was Sobekhotep. Queen Mentuhotep was the wife of king Djehuti. The position of this king within the Second Intermediate Period is uncertain (he has been attributed to both the early 16th and the early 17th dynasties), so the position of Senebhenaf is also not yet fixed.

Some Egyptologists suggested that Senebhenaf was possibly one of the two namesake sons of the vizier Ibiaw who officiated under the 13th Dynasty pharaohs Wahibre Ibiaw and/or Merneferre Ay; if validated, this association could establish a significant temporal link between the Lower Egypt rulers of the mid-late 13th Dynasty and the Upper Egypt kingdom ruled by Djehuti. However, as pointed out by Wolfram Grajetzki, at the current state of knowledge such identification is purely conjectural.

Ibiaw
Senebhenaf	Sobekhotep
Mentuhotep	Djehuti

== Bibliography ==
- Labib Habachi: "The Family of Vizier Ibiˁ and His Place Among the Viziers of the Thirteenth Dynasty", in Studien zur altägyptischen Kultur 11 (1984), pp. 113-126.
