= Ibiaw =

Egyptian vizier

- Vizier of Egypt
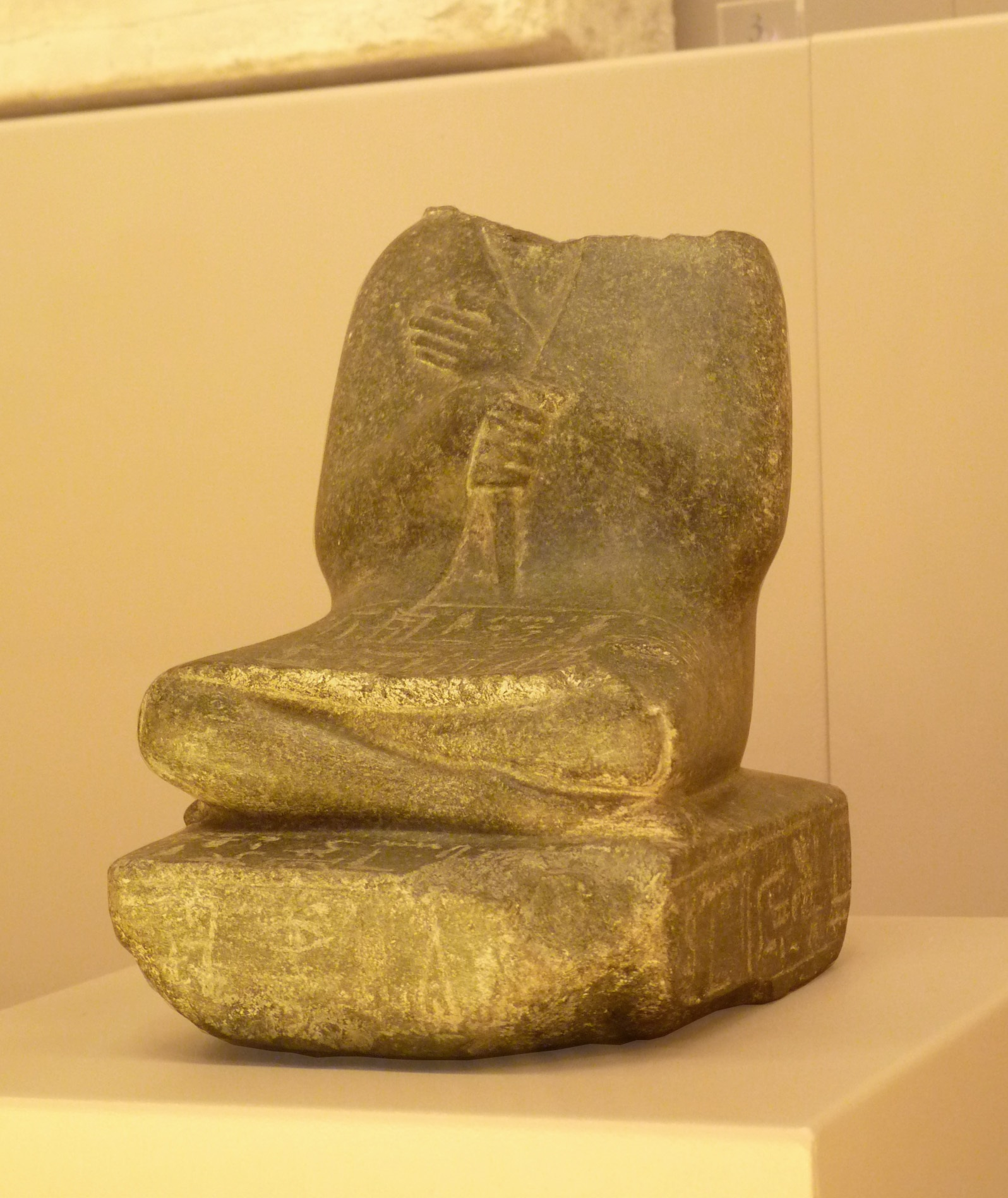
- Statuette of Senebhenaf B citing his parents, vizier Ibiaw and Renressonb. Bologna, MCA.
Egyptian name
ib Z1 i a mwIbiaw
- Dynasty: 13th Dynasty
- Pharaoh: Wahibre Ibiaw and/or Merneferre Ay
- Spouse: Ankhesiref, Renressonb
- Father: Sobka called Bebi?
- Children: Senebhenaf A, Senebhenaf B

Ibiaw or Ibiau was an ancient Egyptian vizier and Chief of the town (i.e. mayor) during the 13th Dynasty, likely under pharaohs Wahibre Ibiaw and/or Merneferre Ay.

== Attestations ==
There are no monuments which directly represent him, but he is mentioned as a vizier on three objects: a stele found at Deir el-Bahari and now exhibited in the Metropolitan Museum of Art (22.3.307), another stele found inside the sanctuary of Heqaib at Elephantine, and a statuette probably from the Temple of Osiris at Abydos and now in Bologna (KS 1839). By combining the three monuments, egyptologists were able to realize a genealogy for Ibiaw:

Id
Ankhesiref	Ibiaw	Renressonb
Senebhenaf A	Senebhenaf B	Ibetib

Some other monuments datable to this period refer to one or more dignitaries called Ibiaw. Some egyptologists believe that those objects could refer to the namesake vizier in some earlier stages of his career. Such statements would expand Ibiaw's genealogy:

- One of the two sons of Ibiaw may have been the vizier Senebhenaf, father of queen Mentuhotep, herself wife of king Djehuti. This association could establish a significant temporal link between kings Ibiaw and Ay of the mid to late 13th dynasty and this poorly attested ruler.
- Ibiaw's father may have been the vizier Sobka called Bebi.
- It has even been suggested that vizier Ibiaw later in his life became the namesake king (i.e. Wahibre Ibiaw).

However, Wolfram Grajetzki later pointed out that, since there is no monument citing with certainty some of Ibiaw's earlier titles, such identifications are purely conjectural and remain unproven.

== Bibliography ==
- Labib Habachi, "The Family of Vizier Ibiˁ and His Place Among the Viziers of the Thirteenth Dynasty", in Studien zur altägyptischen Kultur, 11 (1984), p. 113-126.
