= Unfinished Pyramid =

The Unfinished Pyramid may refer to:

- The Unfinished Pyramid presented in the reverse side of the Great Seal of the United States
- The Layer Pyramid, dating to the 3rd Dynasty of Egypt c. 2630 BC, possibly unfinished due to the death of the king.
- The Pyramid of Neferefre, dating to the 5th Dynasty c. 2460 BC, unfinished due to the premature death of pharaoh Neferefre.
- The Unfinished Northern Pyramid of Zawyet el'Aryan, dating either to the 3rd or 4th Dynasty of Egypt.
- The Southern South Saqqara pyramid dating to the 13th Dynasty (18th century BC) likely unfinished due to the death of the king.

== See also ==
- Frustum
