= Ineni (queen) =

- Great Royal Wife, Khenemetneferhedjet
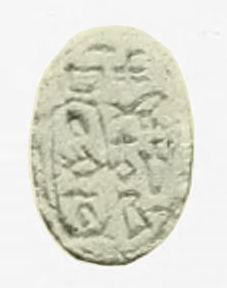
- Scarab with the cartouche of Ineni in the British Museum.
- Spouse: King Merneferre Ay?
Egyptian name
< i in n i >
- Dynasty: 13th Dynasty
- Religion: Ancient Egyptian religion

Ineni (or Ini, Inni) was an ancient Egyptian queen who lived during the Thirteenth Dynasty (around 1700 BC).

She had the titles Great Royal Wife and she, who is united with the white crown. She is one of the first ancient Egyptian queens whose name was written within a cartouche. This approach to writing a name was previously only used for kings' names and some kings' daughters holding special positions. The name of Ineni's husband is not known with any certainty. It is thought that it was king Merneferre Ay, as her scarabs are similar in style to that of this king.

== Attestations ==
She is so far only known from 21 scarabs and a seal impression from Kerma.

- London, British Museum EA 32311 | A green glazed steatite scarab seal () unknown provenance, base inscribed with cartouche and epithet.
- Jerusalem, Israel Museum 76.31.3888 | Scarab seal (19x12 mm).
- New York, Met 22.1.418 | A green glazed steatite scarab seal (22x15x9 mm).
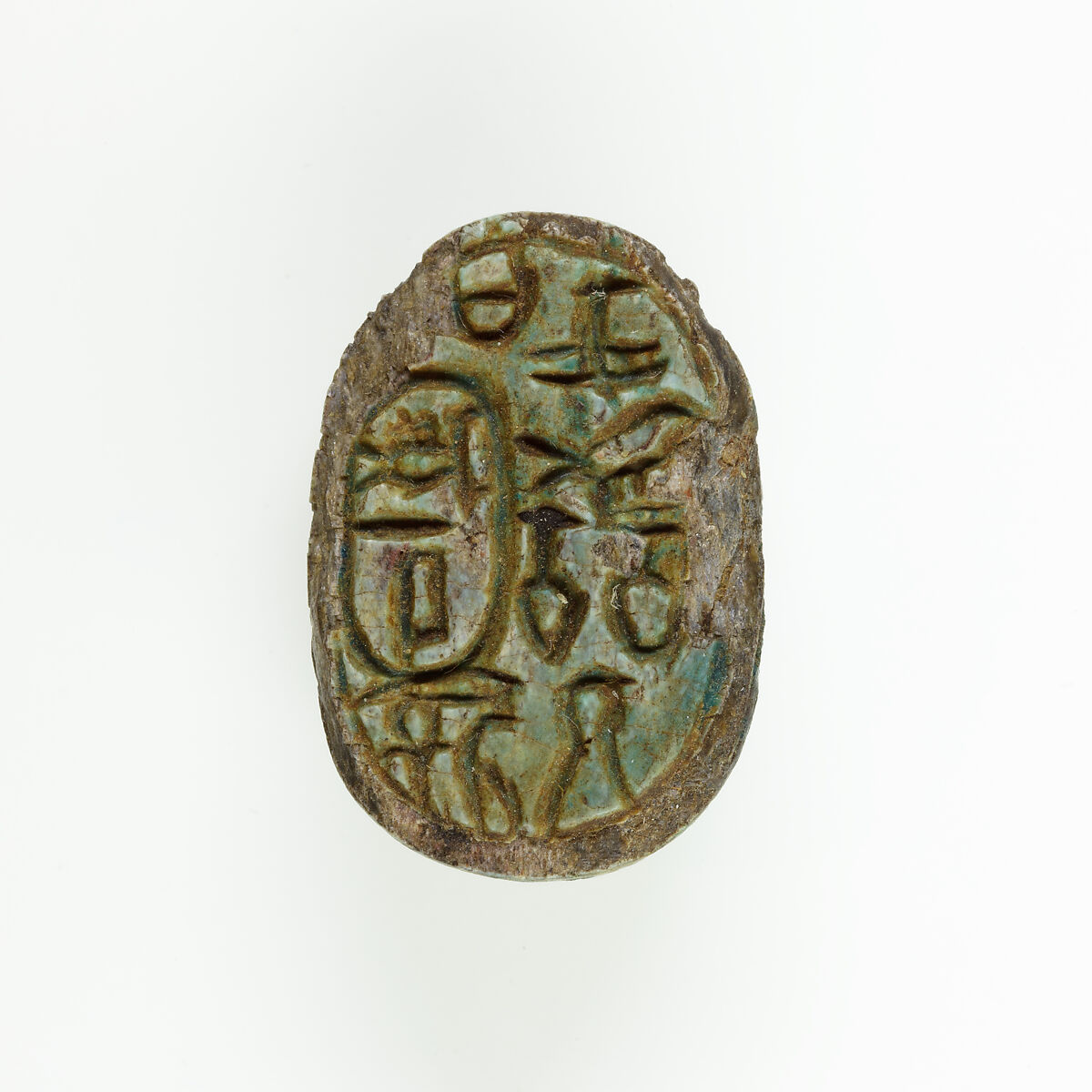
  Scarab of Queen Inni

== Bibliography ==
- Wolfram Grajetzki: Ancient Egyptian Queens, London 2005, p. 40 ISBN 0-9547218-9-6
- Kim Ryholt: The Political Situation in Egypt during the Second Intermediate Period c.1800-1550 B.C. by Museum Tuscalanum Press, p. 38 (discussion of dating) ISBN 87-7289-421-0
