= Sekhemre Sementawy Djehuty =

Egyptian Pharaoh

- Djehuty, Djehuti, Dhout, Dhuti, Tahuti, Tehuti, Thuty
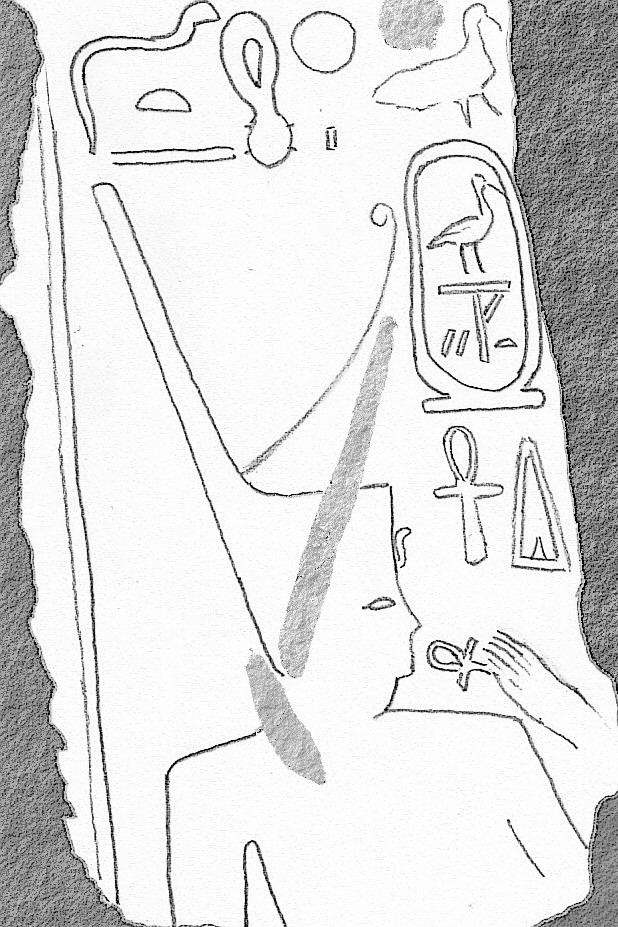
- Djehuti on a block from Edfu

Pharaoh
- Reign: 3 years, c. 1650 BC
- Predecessor: uncertain, name lost in a lacuna of the Turin canon (Ryholt), Sobekemsaf I (von Beckerath)
- Successor: Sobekhotep VIII (Ryholt), Seankhenre Mentuhotepi (von Beckerath)
Royal titulary
Horus name
Itjemnekhtu
Jṯj-m-nḫtw
He who conquers with force
G5	iTi m A24
Golden Horus
Weserkhau
Wsr-ḫˁw
He whose apparitions are mighty
G8 wsr s xa a Z2
Prenomen
Sekhemre Sementawy
Sḫm-Rˁ-s:mn-t3.w(j)
The might of Ra, which (re)-establishes the two lands< ra sxm s mn n N19 >
Nomen
Djehuty
ḏḥwtj
Thoth

G39 N5	G26 t y
- Consort: queen Mentuhotep?
- Dynasty: uncertain 16th Dynasty, or 17th Dynasty

Sekhemre Sementawy Djehuty was a minor king reigning over parts of Upper Egypt during the Second Intermediate Period.

Djehuty is thought to be listed in the first entry of the 11th column of the Turin canon, credited with a reign of 3 years. According to Egyptologists Kim Ryholt and Darrell Baker, he was succeeded by Sobekhotep VIII. He may have been the second king of the Theban 16th Dynasty. Alternatively, he may be a king of the late 13th Dynasty or the fourth king of the 17th Dynasty.

== Family ==
Due to a cosmetic box with the names of Djehuti found in the tomb of Queen Mentuhotep, it has been speculated that she was his king's wife.

== Attestations ==
=== Contemporary attestations ===
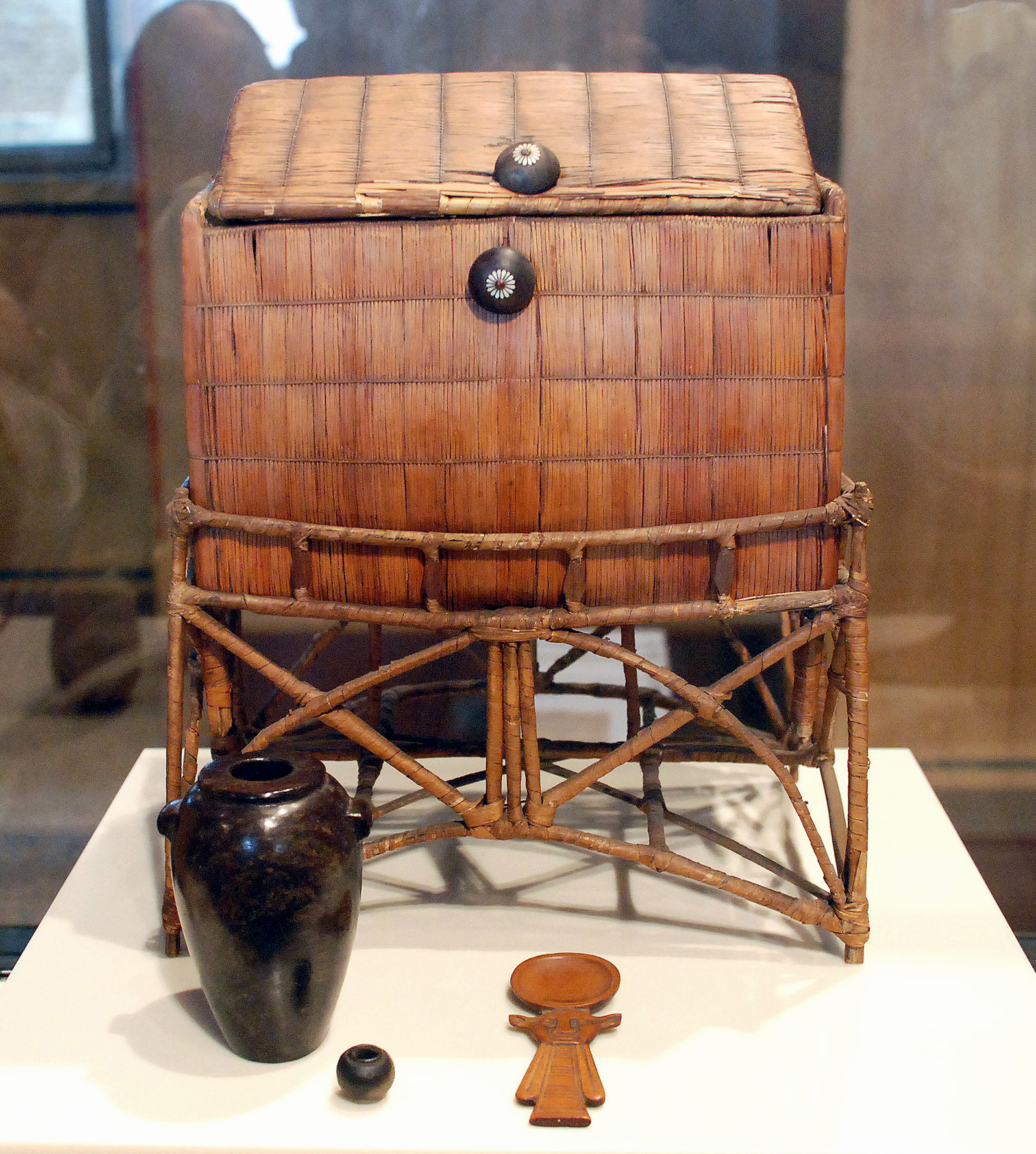
Cosmetics box of queen Mentuhotep, wife of Djehuti. The box may have been intended to be the king's canopic chest.

All of Djehuti's contemporary attestions come from Upper Egypt, within a 145 kilometres (90 mi) long stretch of the Nile valley from Deir el-Ballas in the north to Edfu in the south. This roughly corresponds to the territory in the sphere of influence of the rulers of the 16th dynasty.

At Deir el-Ballas, nomen and prenomen of Djehuti are known from a single block discovered by Flinders Petrie.

At Edfu, a painted block bearing Djehuti's cartouche and showing him wearing the red crown of Lower Egypt was uncovered.

At Thebes, Djehuti is indirectly attested by objects from the burial of Queen Mentuhotep at Dra Abu el-Naga. This tomb was found intact in 1822 and her (now lost) coffin was inscribed with one of the earliest cases of the texts from the Book of the Dead. Mentuhotep's cosmetic box bears Djehuti's nomen, prenomen and cartouche together with funerary formulae and an inscription revealing that the box was a gift from the king.

=== Non-contemporary attestations ===
The Karnak King List #8 (1) mentions Sekhemre Sementawy (sḫm-rꜤ smn-tꜢwi), between a lost cartouce #7 (2) and another lost cartouche 9 (16).

The Turin King List does not directly mention Djehuty, but there are several partial entries starting with Sekhemre. Thus he is sometimes associated with Turin King List 11:1.

== Theories ==
=== Burial ===
It has been suggested that the unattributed Southern South Saqqara pyramid may have been built for Djehuti. This hypothesis is based on a fragmentary inscription found within the pyramid and reading "Weserkha...", a possible reference to Weserkhau i.e. Djehuti's Golden Horus name. This pyramid is in the Memphis-Faiyum region, while Djehuty is mainly attested in the Thebaid region.

=== Chronology ===
Djehuti's dynasty remains debated. Indeed, on this point, the Turin Canon is open to interpretations. There are several kings recorded with the name "Sekhemre[...]" and the damage to the original document does not preserve the complete name. As a result, Djehuti, named Sekhemre Sementawy, may in principle correspond to any "Sekhemre[...]" preserved on the king list, i.e. may be a ruler of the 13th, 16th and even 17th Dynasty.

The Egyptologists Darrell Baker and Kim Ryholt believe that he was part of the 16th Dynasty, which controlled the Theban region after 1650 BC. Alternatively, two studies by Claude Vandersleyen and Christina Geisen date Djehuti's reign to the very end of the Memphite 13th Dynasty. Geisen's datation relies on stylistic considerations of his queen's coffin, which however, Stephen Quirke argues, uses unproven assumptions. An older theory of Jürgen von Beckerath, whose conclusions are shared by Hans Stock, contends that Djehuti was a ruler of the early 17th Dynasty, which arose in Upper Egypt after the collapse of 16th Dynasty following the short-lived Hyksos conquest of Thebes. This theory is supported by the discovery of the tomb of Djehuti's queen, Mentuhotep, which is located in Dra' Abu el-Naga', a necropolis usually associated with the 17th Dynasty. Scholars such as Chris Bennett however, point out that this does not necessarily mean that Djehuti was buried in Dra' Abu el-Naga' as well.

=== Relationships ===
Some Egyptologists proposed that Djehuti was married to a granddaughter of the vizier Ibiaw who served under the 13th Dynasty king Wahibre Ibiau c. 1712–1701 BC, and was thus most likely two generations removed from this king. In more recent times, however, it was pointed out that the link between Ibiaw and Djehuti's consort Mentuhotep is still unproven and that the proposed temporal correlation between Wahibre Ibiau and Djehuti remains conjectural.

Unknown	Pharaoh of Egypt; Sixteenth Dynasty of Egypt	Succeeded by Sobekhotep VIII
