= Southern South Saqqara pyramid =

Building in Egypt

- Interactive map of Southern South Saqqara pyramid
- 29°49′50″N 31°13′20″E
- Owner: unknown (see Attribution), 13th Dynasty
- Constructed: 18th century BCE
- Type: True pyramid (now ruined)
- Material: Mudbrick (core); Tura limestone (casing, barely started)
- Base: 78.75 m (258.4 ft)

The Southern South Saqqara Pyramid (also Unfinished Pyramid at South Saqqara; Lepsius XLVI; SAK S 6) is an ancient Egyptian royal tomb which was built during the 13th Dynasty in South Saqqara, and is renowned for having the most elaborate hypogeum since the late 12th Dynasty pyramids. The building remains unfinished and its owner is still uncertain as no unambiguous evidence has been found to settle the issue. In 2008, the Egyptologist Christoffer Theis proposed that the pyramid was built for king Djehuti, based on an inscription discovered nearby by Gustave Jéquier.

== Pyramid complex ==
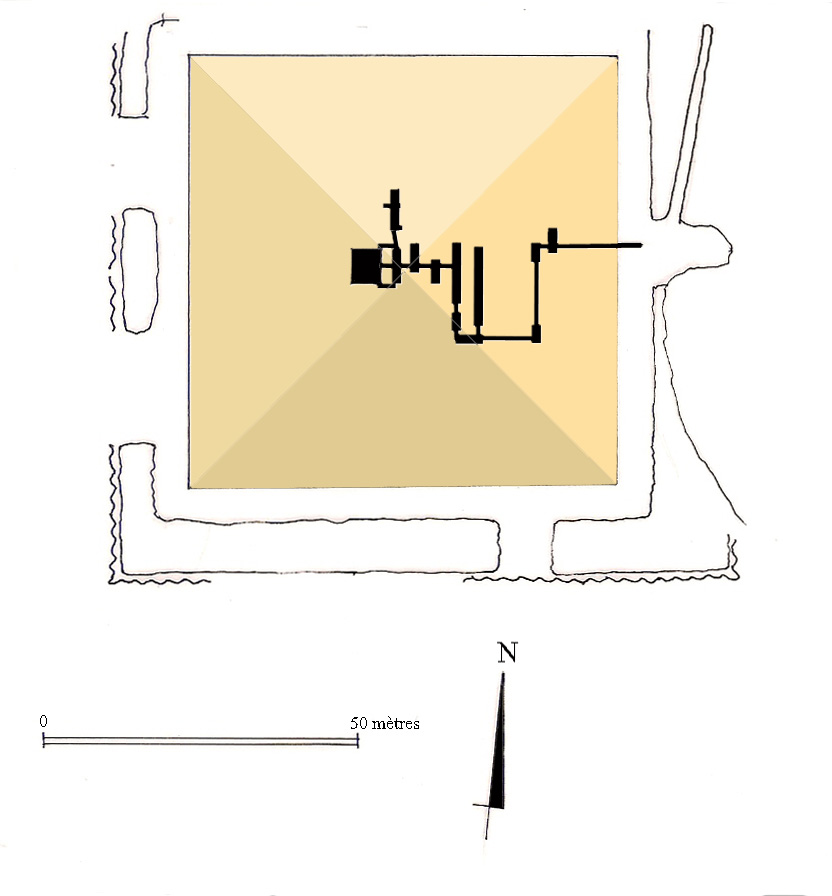
Plan of the complex

It is located southwest of the pyramid of Khendjer. The pyramid was rediscovered in the 1910–1911 expedition by Ernest Mackay and Flinders Petrie; in 1929–1930 Gustave Jéquier conducted a detailed exploration of the pyramid complex. The complex consists of a hypogeum, a barely started superstructure and a wavy enclosure wall; other expected subsidiary structures, such as the cult pyramid, funerary temple, etc., were not found.

Remarkably, two uninscribed cap-stones made from black granite were discovered within the site, which seem to have brought there quite early compared to the incomplete superstructure.

The pyramid appears to have been planned to be slightly larger than actually built: The base was designed to be a square of 78.75 m (258.4 ft) per side, adjacent to the 52.5 m (172 ft) base of Khendjer’s pyramid. Fine Tura limestone bricks were used for the walls of the hypogeum; the same material was also used for the incomplete superstructure foundations, the trench of which was 1.8 m (5.9 ft) deep and 5.5 m (18 ft) wide. The unique sinusoid-shaped enclosure wall is relatively well preserved. It was made of mudbricks and is 0.65 m (2.1 ft) thick with foundations 1 m (3.3 ft) deep. At the four corners of the pyramid a few objects belonging to the foundation deposits have been found, but none of the finds bears any name.

== Hypogeum ==
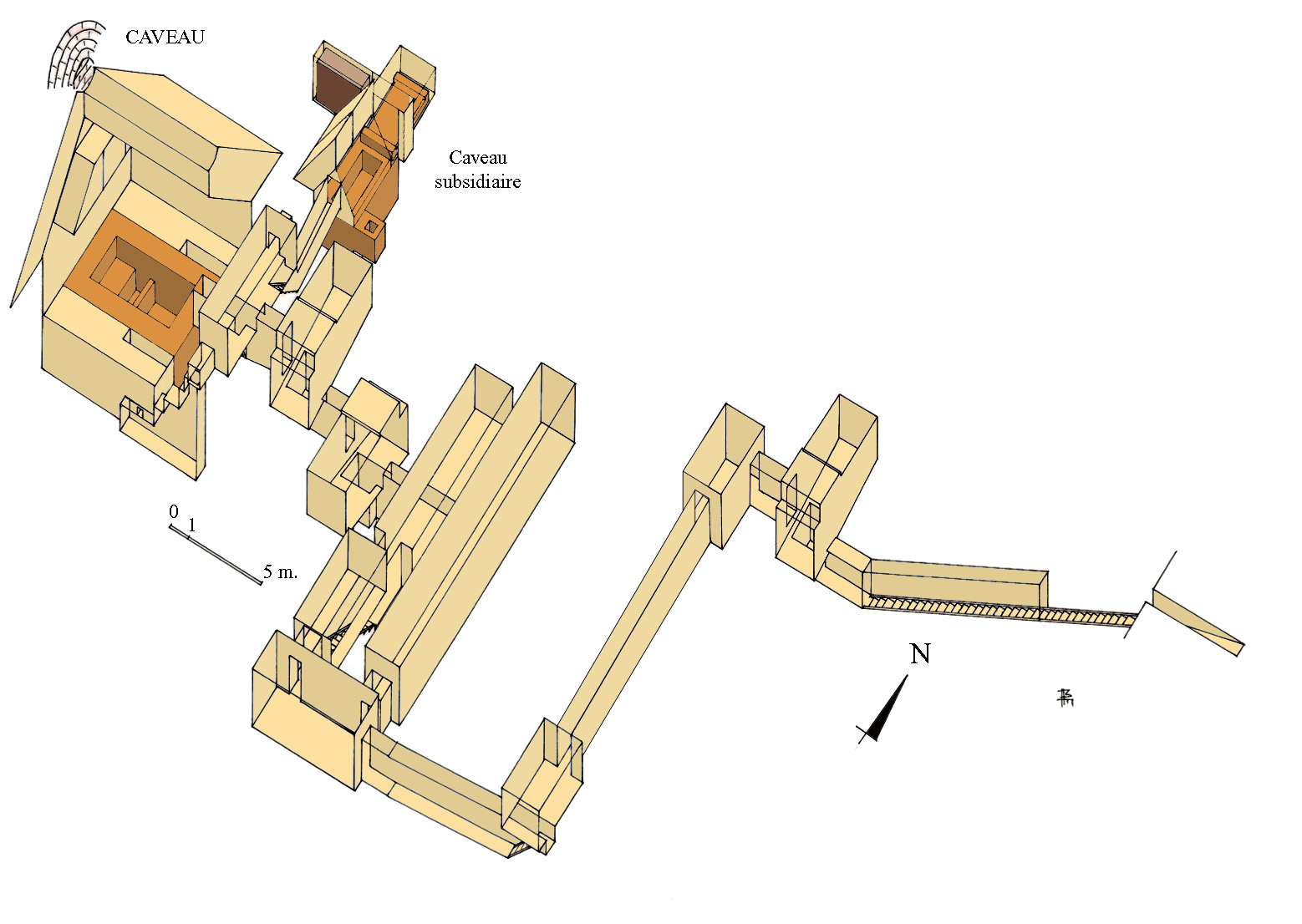
Isometric view of the hypogeum with the slabs over the larger sarcophagus chamber removed

The hypogeum is remarkable for its size and complexity, and is the largest and most elaborate of all known pyramids dating from the late 12th and 13th dynasties. The passageway changes directions and level several times, and was planned to contain four portcullises, more than any other pyramid from that period.

=== Entryway ===
The pyramid entrance is on the east side. A long descending staircase passes through the alcove where the first portcullis was intended to be put. The corridor turns left and continues then turns right, again facing west.

At that point two passageways open on the right side of the corridor: The first passage is the entry to a long storage hallway; the second passage is a staircase that again descends level and turns left (facing west). The passage continues west through the second (on the left) and third (on the right) portcullises, each of which involves a level change without stairs, and finally arriving to the last fork, which is a hallway leading to the two sarcophagus chambers. The larger sarcophagus chamber directly ahead (west), and the smaller sarcophagus chamber to the right (north).

=== Two sarcophagus chambers ===
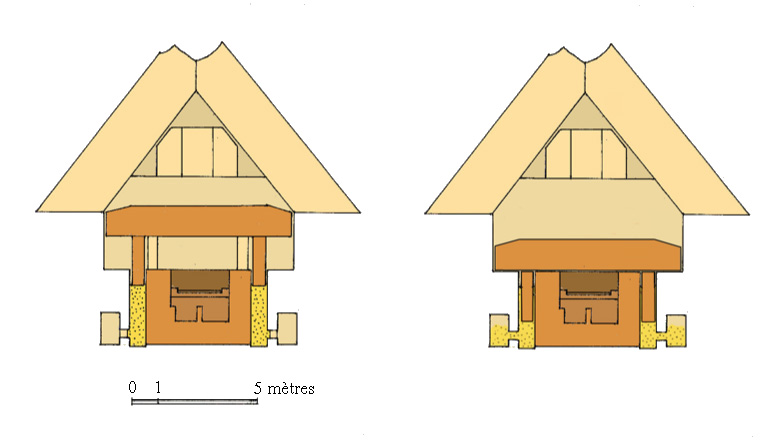
Diagram showing how the main sarcophagus chamber was sealed, with the large slabs atop the quartzite monolith being lowered into place by displacing sand

The main sarcophagus chamber, with its inverted-V-shaped ceiling, is directly opposite the entrance of the fork-hallway, to the west. It is the larger of the two chambers, and contains a monolithic 150 t (330,000 lb) quartzite block which has a large cavity carved in its center to contain a sarcophagus and a niche for a canopic chest, both unused: Evidently no canopic chest nor sarcophagus were ever placed in the large chamber.

The entrance to the second, smaller sarcophagus chamber is on the north side of the fork-hallway, and is laid out as two separate parts. The purpose of the chamber is unclear: It may have been intended for a queen consort, or for the king's ka, a co-regnal sibling of the pharaoh, or maybe simply a false burial chamber intended to confuse grave robbers. The two parts of the second sarcophagus chamber were designed to be separated by a fourth and last portcullis, still open. It is peculiar for having the order of the “antechamber” and the sarcophagus-vault swapped: The sarcophagus-vault is entered before what would customarily be the “antechamber”, which holds the lid of the sarcophagus and would have been sealed off by the wall formed by the portcullis, once in place. This strange layout is also unexplained, perhaps reflecting some unknown reason of religion or tradition.

=== Plundering ===
The hypogeum was designed to be virtually impervious to plunderers by several sophisticated expedients, such as direction changes, level changes, trapdoors hidden beneath the pavement, ceiling, and side walls, and the four portcullises, and possibly a decoy burial chamber (if indeed the second sarcophagus chamber was intended as a false chamber, as proposed above).

Despite the precautions, robbers managed to make their way into the burial chambers only to find them empty. There are indications that the pyramid was first violated in antiquity and at least another time much later. The second entry was likely during the times of the Abbasid caliph al-Ma'mūn (9th century CE) who entered the Great Pyramid of Giza. Gustave Jéquier was able to reach the chambers through the corridor and a thieves’ tunnel.

== Attribution ==
The complex shares many similarities with other complexes, such as the pyramid of Khendjer, the Northern Mazghuna pyramid, and to a lesser extent the pyramid of Ameny Qemau (mainly in having a second sarcophagus).

None of the objects recovered from the complex provides the name of its owner, although construction management labels were found that refer to regnal years 3 to 5. A fragmentary inscription found within the pyramid reads "Weserkha..." that might refer to the Golden Horus name Weserkhau of king Djehuti, suggesting that he could have been the pyramid owner.

Considering the size, complexity, and quality of various parts of the hypogeum, Rainer Stadelmann argued that the owner should have been an important (or at least ambitious) pharaoh when compared with the standards of the period.

Jéquier proposed that the pyramid belonged to a close predecessor or successor of Khendjer such as Wegaf or Imyremeshaw. Ryholt excluded Wegaf due to his too-brief reign compared to the regnal years on the construction labels, and rather proposed Imyremeshaw or his successor Sehetepkare Intef as possible owners. Landua-McCormack suggested that the two sarcophagus chambers might have belonged to two brother pharaohs of the 13th Dynasty, such as the relatively wealthy kings Neferhotep I and Sobekhotep IV. However, continuing excavations in Abydos have since led Egyptologist Josef Wegner to attribute tombs S9 and S10 to Neferhotep I and Sobekhotep IV instead.

== See also ==
- List of Egyptian pyramids
