= Mentuhotep (queen) =

- Great Royal Wife, Khenemetneferhedjet
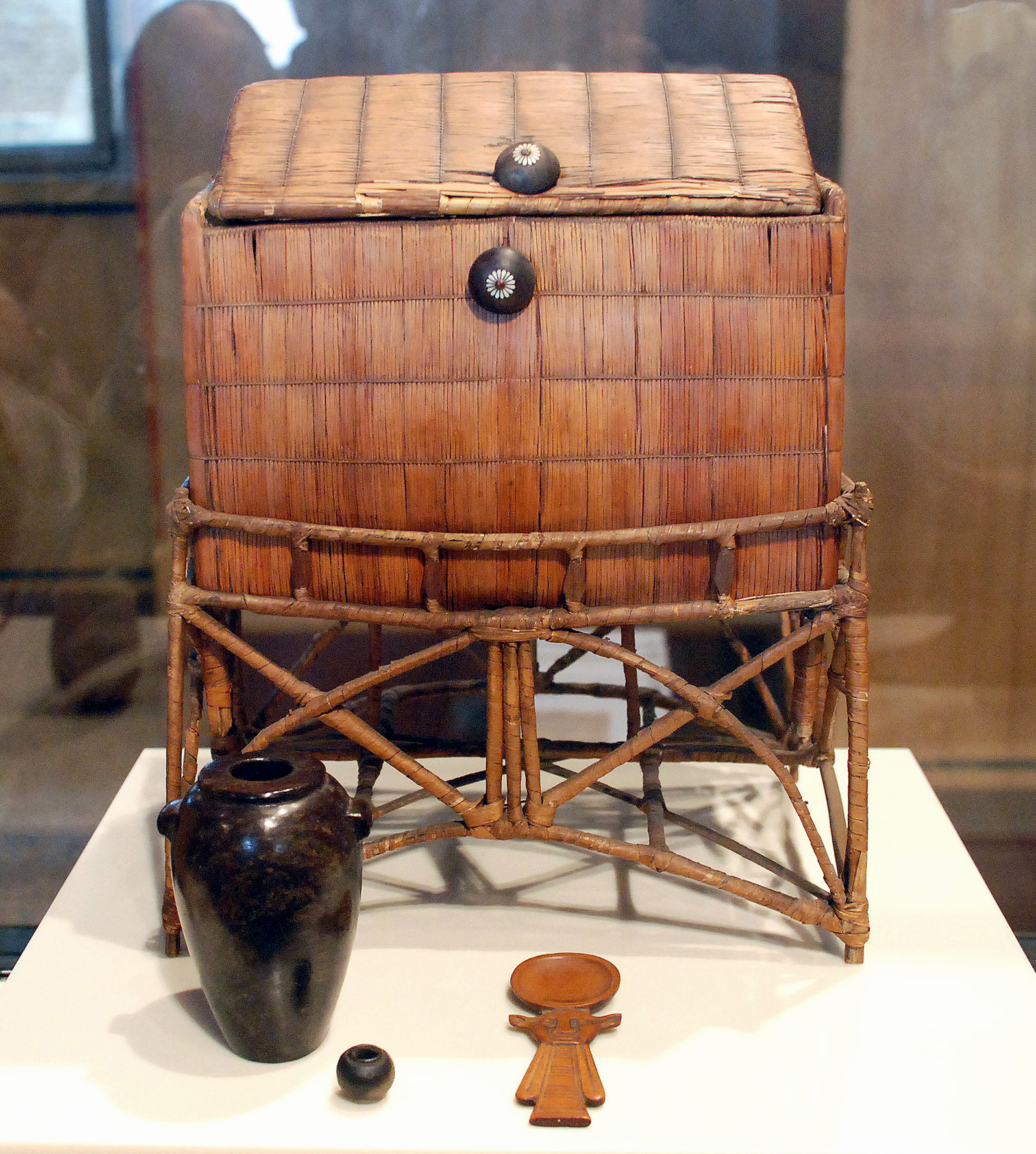
- Cosmetic box from the burial of queen Mentuhotep
- Burial: Dra' Abu el-Naga'
- Spouse: King Djehuti
Egyptian name
Mnṯ.w htp
Montu is satisfied
mn n T Htp t p
- Dynasty: Sixteenth Dynasty of Egypt
- Father: Senebhenaf
- Mother: Sobekhotep
- Religion: Ancient Egyptian religion

Mentuhotep was an ancient Egyptian queen of the Second Intermediate Period, wife of pharaoh Djehuti. Her main title was Great Royal Wife. Another title was Khenemetneferhedjet (she who is united with the white crown).

== Family ==
She was the daughter of the vizier Senebhenaf and of a woman called Sobekhotep. Thus, she was of non-royal origin either she married a king or her husband became a king.

== Attestations ==
Queen Mentuhotep is known from parts of her burial equipment found between 1822 and 1825 near Thebes at Dra' Abu el-Naga' by the Italian excavator Giuseppe Passalacqua.

=== Coffin ===
The Coffin of Mentuhotep is now lost. Around 1832 John Gardner Wilkinson copied inscriptions of a coffin naming a queen with the same name. On the coffin it is stated that she was the daughter of the vizier Senebhenaf and of a woman called Sobekhotep. The inside of the coffin was decorated with different spells, many of them belong to the Egyptian Book of the Dead. Her coffin is one of the earliest sources for this funerary composition. It is not fully clear whether the coffin and the canopic chest were found in the same tomb. Giuseppe Passalacqua described the tomb and mentions an anthropoid coffin richly decorated with figures of deities. However, the coffin copied by Wilkinson is rectangular and not decorated with figures of gods. Therefore, Herbert E. Winlock, looking at the evidence concluded that there were two queens with the name Mentuhotep. One was the wife of king Djehuti, the other one is known from her coffin.

=== Canopic Chest with Cosmetic Boxes ===
Passalacqua found a canopic chest with cosmetic boxes. The objects were later sold to Berlin. With the cosmetic box were found some other objects, including several alabaster vessels. However, these vessels belong according to their type to the 25th Dynasty.

The canopic chest was given to queen Mentuhotep by king Djehuti, as indicated in a dedication inscribed on the box. The original canopic chest is inscribed for the king. Inside of it were found two cosmetic boxes, made of wood and papyrus. Inside the box were found alabaster vessels and a cosmetic spoon.

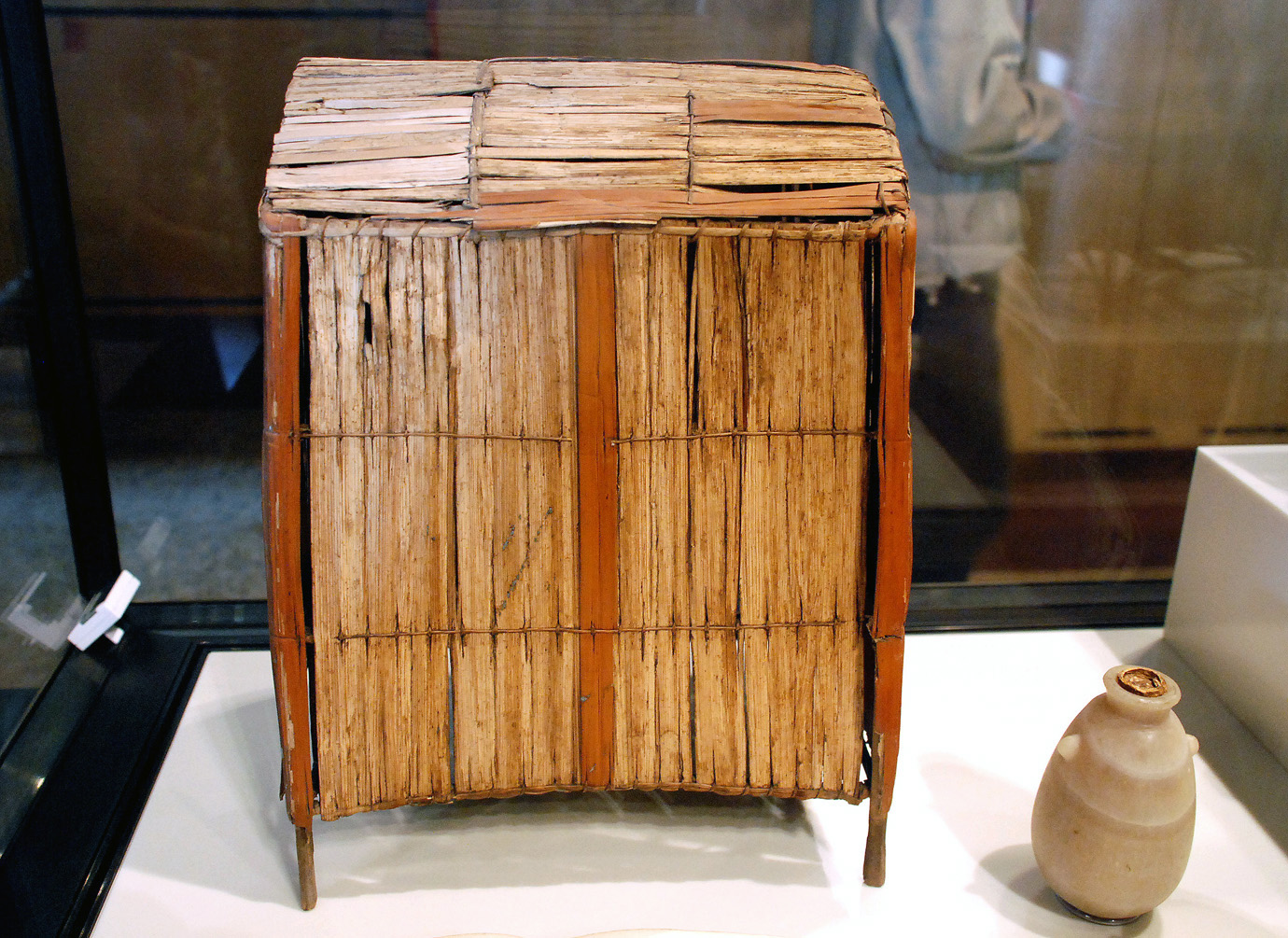
Cover for the cosmetic box of queen Mentuhotep.
