= Merneferre Ay =

Egyptian pharaoh

- Aya, Eje, Aye, Iy, Mernoferre, Ay I
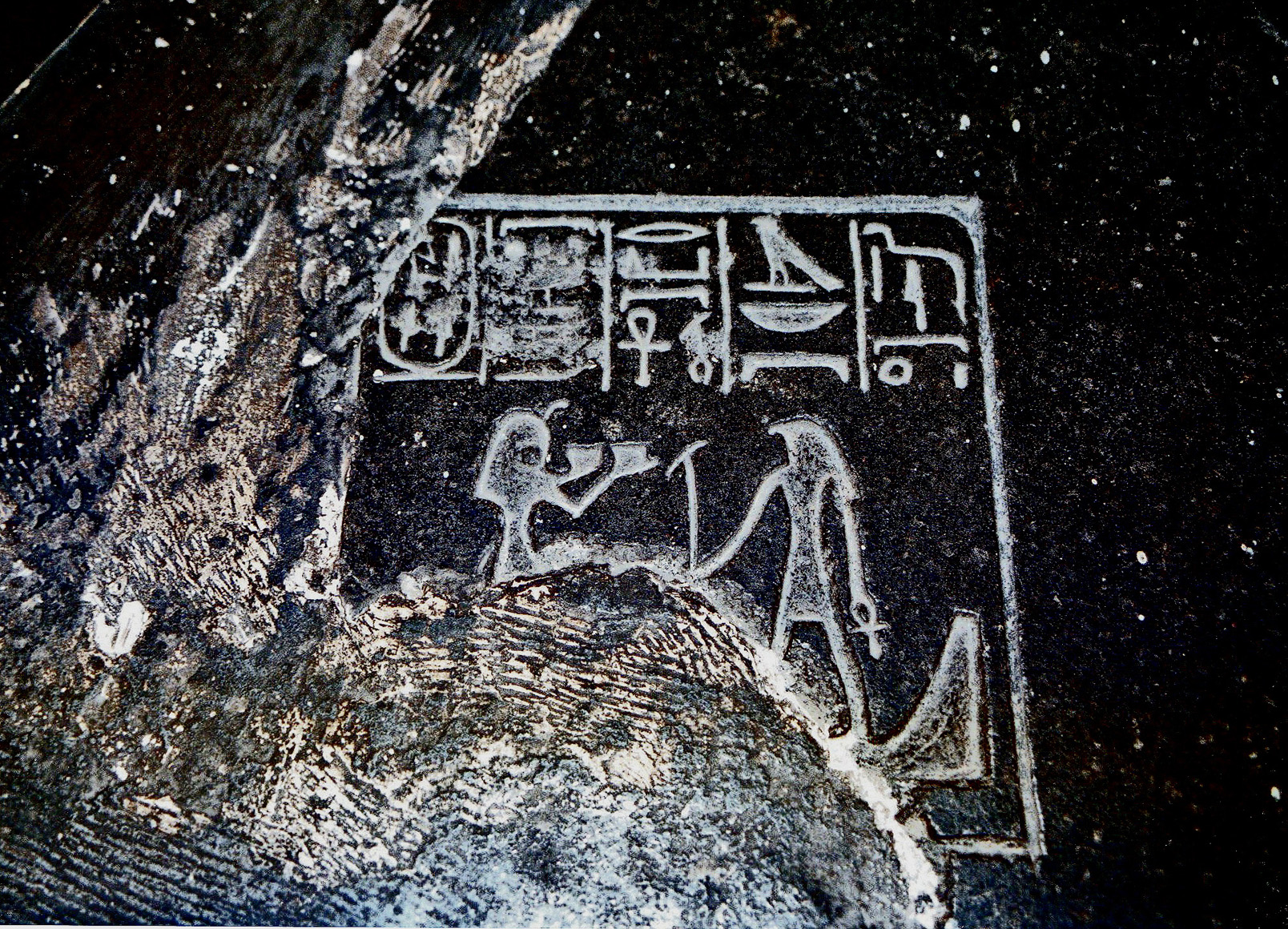
- An inscribed section of the pyramidion of king Merneferre Ay's tomb.

Pharaoh
- Reign: 23 years, 8 months and 18 days, 1701–1677 BC, 1695–1685 BC, 1684–1661 BC
- Predecessor: Wahibre Ibiau
- Successor: Merhotepre Ini
Royal titulary
Prenomen
Merneferre
mr-nfr-Rˁ
He who loves the perfection of Ra
M23 t L2 t < N5 U7 nfr >
Turin King List: Merneferre
mr-nfr-Rˁ
M23 t L2 t < N5 U7 r nfr >
Nomen
Ay
Iii
G39 N5 < i A2 i i >
- Consort: Ineni?
- Dynasty: 13th Dynasty

Merneferre Ay (also spelled Aya or Eje, sometimes known as Ay I) was an ancient Egyptian pharaoh of the mid 13th Dynasty. The longest reigning pharaoh of the 13th Dynasty, he ruled a likely fragmented Egypt for over 23 years in the early to mid 17th century BC. A pyramidion bearing his name shows that he possibly completed a pyramid, probably located in the necropolis of Memphis.

Merneferre Ay is the last pharaoh of the 13th Dynasty to be attested outside Upper Egypt. In spite of his long reign, the number of artefacts attributable to him is comparatively small. This may point to problems in Egypt at the time and indeed, by the end of his reign, "the administration [of the Egyptian state] seems to have completely collapsed". It is possible that the capital of Egypt since the early Middle Kingdom, Itjtawy was abandoned during or shortly after Ay's reign. For this reason, some scholars consider Merneferre Ay to be the last pharaoh of the Middle Kingdom of Egypt.

== Reign ==
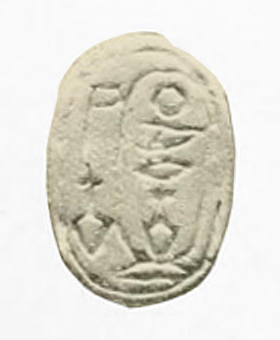
Green glazed steatite scarab of Merneferre Ay, British Museum.

As a king of the mid 13th Dynasty, Merneferre Ay reigned over Middle and Upper Egypt concurrently with the 14th Dynasty, which controlled at least the Eastern Nile Delta. The egyptologists Kim Ryholt and Darrell Baker contend that Mernferre usurped the throne at the expense of his predecessor Wahibre Ibiau. They base this conclusion on the total absence of filiative nomina, that is references to the name of his father on the artefacts attributable to him. They believe that this should have been the case had his father been a pharaoh, and indeed a number of 13th Dynasty kings used filiative nomina. Little is known of Ay's consorts, he was possibly married to Ineni whose scarabs are stylistically similar to those of Ay.

=== Chronological position ===
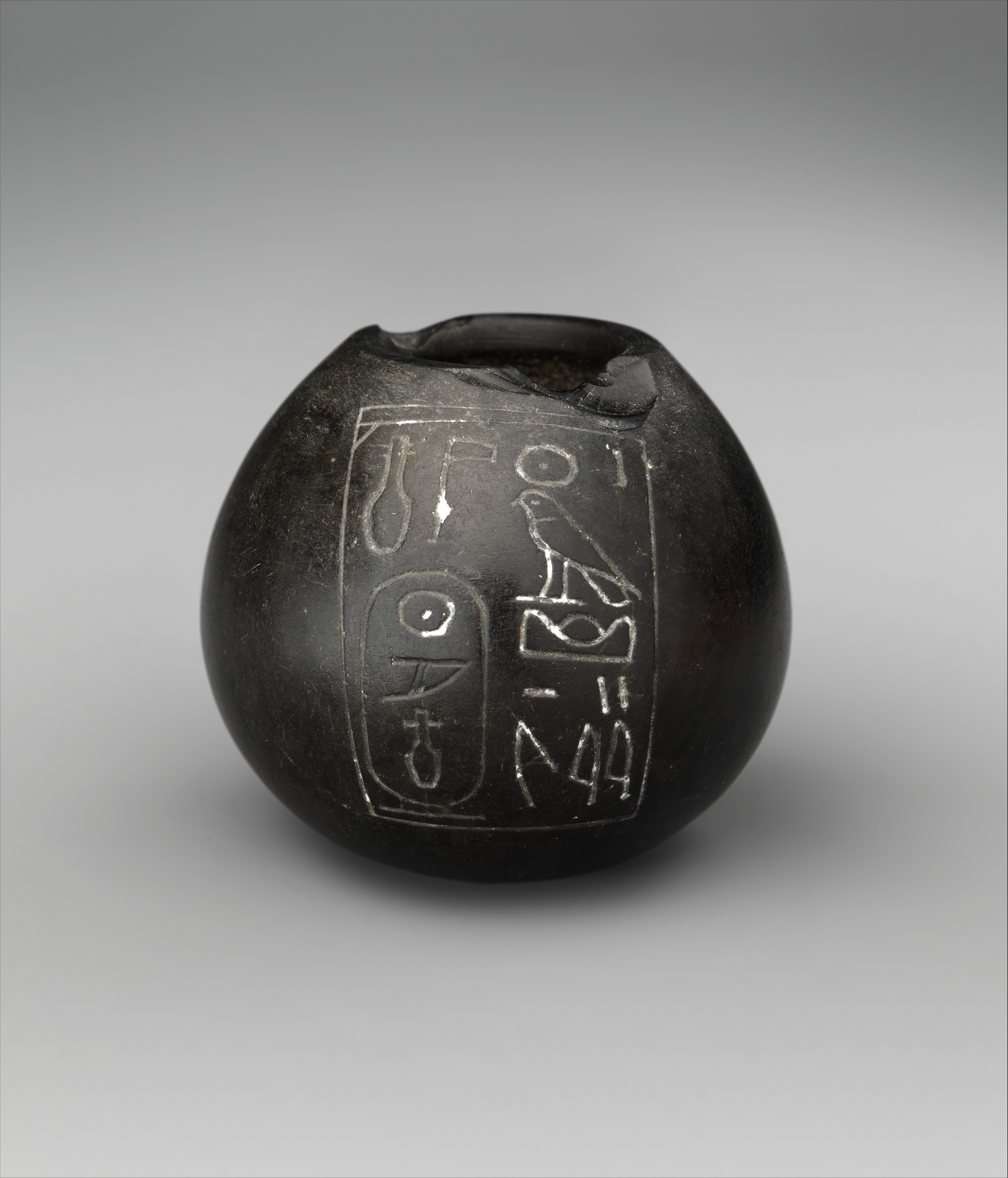
Globular jar of Merneferre Ay, Metropolitan Museum of Art

The relative chronological position of Merneferre Ay as a king of the mid 13th Dynasty is well established by the Turin canon, a king list redacted during the early Ramesside period (1292–1069 BC) and which serves as the primary historical source for the Second Intermediate Period. The king list records Ay's name on column 8 line 3 (column 6 line 3 in Alan Gardiner's reading of the Turin canon and entry 7.3 in von Beckerath's reading) and establishes that Merneferre Ay was preceded by Wahibre Ibiau and succeeded by Merhotepre Ini, who was possibly his son.

The precise chronological placement of Merneferre Ay varies between scholars, with Jürgen von Beckerath and Aidan Dodson seeing him as the 27th king of the dynasty while Kim Ryholt and Darrell Baker place him in the 32nd and 33rd positions, respectively. Similarly, the absolute datation of Ay's reign is debated and varies by 17 years between Ryholt's 1701–1677 BC and Schneider's 1684–1661 BC.

=== Reign length ===
Until recently, the duration of Merneferre Ay's reign, which is recorded in the Turin canon, was disputed by Jürgen von Beckerath who read the damaged figure on the papyrus fragment as 13 years while both Alan Gardiner and Kenneth Kitchen maintained it should be read as 23 years. The dispute was settled in the latest study of the Turin canon by Kim Ryholt who confirms that Merneferre Ay's reign length as recorded on the papyrus is "23 years, 8 months and 18 days". Ryholt insists that "the tick that distinguishes 20 and 30 from 10 is preserved and beyond dispute. Accordingly, 23 years or, less likely, 33 years must be read." This makes Merneferre Ay the longest-ruling pharaoh of the 13th Dynasty at a time when numerous short-lived kings ruled Egypt.

=== Attestations ===
Merneferre Ay is attested by 62 scarab seals and one cylinder-seal bearing his name are known, 51 of which are of unknown provenance. Among the scarabs of known provenance, three are from Lower Egypt, one from Bubastis and two from Heliopolis. The rest of the scarabs of known provenance are from Abydos, Coptos and Lisht, all localities being in Middle or Upper Egypt.

Other attestations of Ay include an obsidian globular jar now in the Metropolitan Museum of Art, a ball dedicated to Sobek, an inscribed limestone block, part of a lintel, discovered in 1908 by Georges Legrain in Karnak and a pyramidion.

== Death and Burial ==
=== Pyramidion ===
Pyramidion of Merneferre Ay in the Egyptian Museum in 2015

The pyramidion was confiscated from robbers by the Egyptian police in 1911 at Faqus, close to the ancient city of Avaris. It is carved with the name of Ay and shows him offering to Horus "Lord of heaven", demonstrating that a pyramid was built for him during his long reign. The fact that the pyramidion was probably discovered by the robbers in modern-day Khatana, part of the ancient city of Avaris (modern-day Qantir) is important since it was likely the capital of the 14th Dynasty during Ay's lifetime. Egyptologists believe that the pyramidion originates in fact from Memphis, in the necropolis of which Ay's pyramid must be located. Accordingly, this suggests that the pyramid was looted at the time of the Hyksos invasion c. 1650 BC and the pyramidion taken to Avaris at this moment. This is vindicated by the "damaged text on the pyramidion [which] originally invoked four gods" two of whom were Ptah and Re-Horus (for Ra-Horakhty). The cults of these gods were based in the Memphite necropolis, not in Avaris. Other objects which suffered the same fate include two colossal statues of the 13th Dynasty king Imyremeshaw.

== Legacy ==
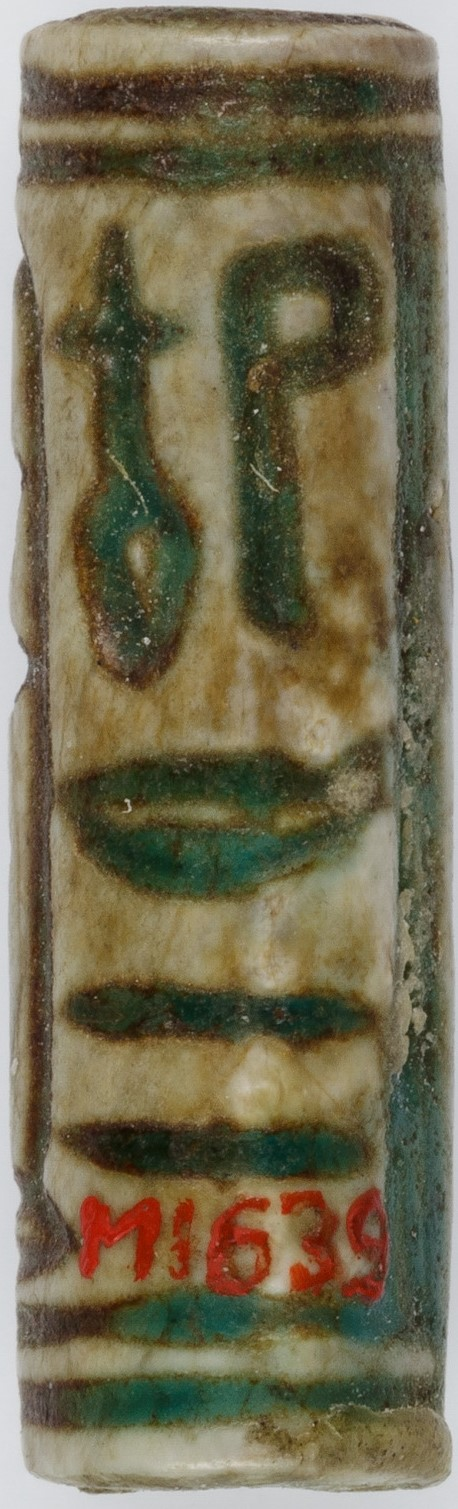
Cylinder seal of Merneferre Ay

Even though Merneferre Ay is well attested, the number of objects attributable to him is relatively small given his nearly 24 year-long reign. This may point to serious problems in Egypt at the time and indeed Ryholt and others believe that by the end of Ay's reign "the administration [of the Egyptian state] seems to have completely collapsed".

Merneferre Ay is the last Egyptian king of the 13th Dynasty who is attested by objects from outside of Upper Egypt. This may indicate the abandonment of the old capital of the Middle Kingdom Itjtawy in favor of Thebes. Daphna Ben Tor believes that this event was triggered by the invasion of the eastern Delta and the Memphite region by Canaanite rulers. Indeed some egyptologists believe that by the end of Ay's reign the 13th dynasty had lost control of Lower Egypt, including the Delta region and possibly Memphis itself. For these authors, this marks the end of the Middle Kingdom and the beginning of the Second Intermediate Period. This analysis is rejected by Ryholt and Baker however, who note that the stele of Seheqenre Sankhptahi, reigning toward the very end of the 13th Dynasty, strongly suggests that he reigned over Memphis. Unfortunately, the stele is of unknown provenance.

== See also ==
- Media related to Merneferre Ay at Wikimedia Commons
- List of pharaohs

Preceded by Wahibre Ibiau	Pharaoh of Egypt; Thirteenth Dynasty	Succeeded by Merhotepre Ini
