= Wahibre Ibiau =

Egyptian pharaoh

- Wahibre Ibiaw
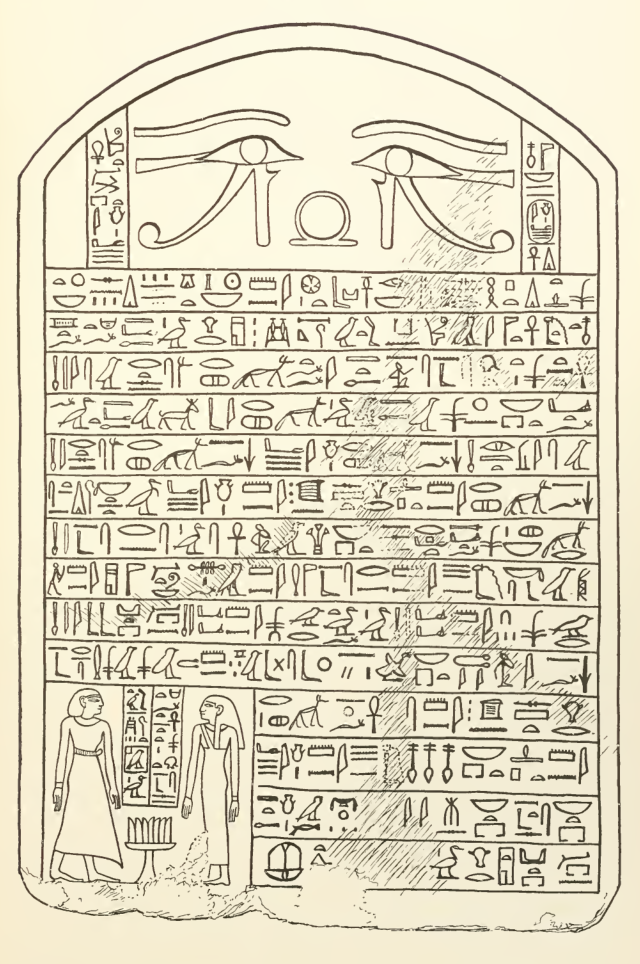
- Stela of the official Sahathor, with the cartouche of Ibiau. British Museum (EA 1348)

Pharaoh
- Reign: 10 years, 8 months and 29 days (Turin King List); 1670 BCE (est)
- Predecessor: Sobekhotep VI
- Successor: Merneferre Ay
Royal titulary
Prenomen
Wahibre
W3ḥ-jb-Rˁ
The steadfast heart of Ra
M23 t L2 t < ra wAH H ib Z1 >
Turin King List: Wahibre Ibiau
W3ḥ-jb-Rˁ jb-jaw
The steadfast heart of Ra, he whose heart is pure
< ra wAH H Y1 ib Z1 i a mw A24 ib Z1 >
Nomen
Ibiau
Jb-jaw
He whose heart is pure
G39 N5 < ib Z1 i a mw >
- Dynasty: 13th Dynasty? Second Intermediate Period

Wahibre Ibiau was an ancient Egyptian petty king, perhaps of the 13th Dynasty, during the Second Intermediate Period. He may have reigned for about 10 years according to the Turin King List.

== Reign ==
Despite a relatively long reign for the period, Wahibre Ibiau (throne name: Wahibre; birth name: Ibiau, also Ibiaw, Iaib, or Ia-ib) is known from only a few objects, mostly scarab seals bearing his name. He is also named on the stela of an official named Sahathor, probably from Thebes. Finally, a fragment of faience from El-Lahun mentions this king.

A notable member of Ibiau's royal court was the namesake vizier Ibiau. It has been suggested that this vizier could have been the same person as the pharaoh Ibiau earlier in his life, but in more recent times it was pointed out that such an identification is conjectural and unproven.

== Attestations ==
Ibiau is mostly attested by small finds, see Ryholt 1997:355-354 File 13/32.

- Beirut, National Museum | At Byblos, a scarab seal.
- UCL 16056 | At Lahun (Kahun), a faience cup fragment. Ryholt (1997:147) notes that this may date to shortly before Lahun was abandoned. The Asiatic portion of the population may have migrated to and contributed to the expansion of Tell el-Daba, Nile Delta.
- Unknown | At Lisht, a stamp-seal.
- MMA 09.180.1139 | At [el-Mahamid Qibli], a bead with dedication to Sobek, Lord of smnw which was found at Lisht.

Cylinder seals | At [el-Mahamid Qibli], 3x cylinder seals with dedicartion to Sobek, Lord of smnw.

Scarab seals | Provenance Unknown, 8x scarab seals.

=== Mentions Overseer of Compound Ibiau ===
The Overseer of Compound, Ibiau, with the title string ḫtmw-bjtj; jmj-rꜣ ḫnrt jb(⸗j)-jꜥ (PD 62). Habachi (1984) identified Overseer of Compound Ibiau with Vizier Ibiau. However, other family members (children) appear to be different.

- Stela BM EA 1348 | A stela with royal name Wahibre Ibiau (cartouche) belonging to Sihathor and Overseer of Compound, Ibiau (PD 62).
- Statue Aswan 1343 | At Elephantine, a statue with Overseer of Compound Ibiau (PD 62), same person as BM EA 1348.

=== Non-Contemporary Attestation ===
==== Karnak King List ====
His name does not appear in the preserved parts of the list.

==== Turin King List ====
The Turin King List 8:02 mentions "The Dual King Wahibra Jaib, 10 years, 8 months, 28 days". His predecessor is Khahotepra (8:01) and successor is Merneferra (8:03).

== See also ==
- List of pharaohs

== Bibliography ==
- K. S. B. Ryholt, The Political Situation in Egypt during the Second Intermediate Period (Carsten Niebuhr Institute Publications, c. 1800–1550 BC, 20. Copenhagen: Museum Tusculanum Press, 1997), 353–54, File 13/32.

Preceded by Sobekhotep VI	Pharaoh of Egypt; Thirteenth Dynasty	Succeeded by Merneferre Ay
