= List of state leaders in the 16th century BC =

State leaders in the 17th century BC – State leaders in the 15th century BC – State leaders by year

This is a list of state leaders in the 16th century BC (1600–1501 BC).

== Africa: Northeast ==
Egypt: Second Intermediate Period

- Fifteenth Dynasty of the Second Intermediate Period (complete list) –

- Khyan, King (c.1610–1580 BC)
- Apepi, King (c.1575–1540 BC)
- Khamudi, King (c.1540 BC)

- Sixteenth Dynasty of the Theban region in Upper Egypt: Second Intermediate Period (complete list) –

- Nebiriau II, King (c.1600 BC)
- Semenre, King (c.1600 BC)
- Bebiankh, King (c.1600–1588 BC)
- Sekhemre Shedwast, King (early-16th century BC)
- Dedumose I, King (c.1590 BC)
- Dedumose II, King (c.1590 BC)
- Djedankhre Montemsaf, King (c.1590 BC)
- Merankhre Mentuhotep, King (c.1585 BC)
- Senusret IV, King (early-16th century BC)
- Pepi IV, King (uncertain chronological position)

- Seventeenth Dynasty of the Second Intermediate Period (complete list) –

- Rahotep, King (1580–1576 BC)
- Nebmaatre, King (1570s BC)
- Sobekemsaf I, King (1570s BC)
- Sobekemsaf II, King (1570s BC)
- Sekhemre-Wepmaat Intef, King (c.1573–c.1571 BC)
- Nubkheperre Intef, King (c.1571–1560s BC)
- Sekhemre-Heruhirmaat Intef, King (1560s BC)
- Senakhtenre Ahmose, King (1559–1558 BC)
- Seqenenre Tao, King (c.1560/1558–c.1554 BC)
- Kamose, King (c.1555–1550/1549 BC)

Egypt: New Kingdom

- Eighteenth Dynasty of the New Kingdom (complete list) –

- Ahmose I, King (1550–1525 BC)
- Amenhotep I, King (1525–1504 BC)
- Thutmose I, King (1506–1493 BC)

== Asia ==
=== Asia: East ===
China

- Shang, China (complete list) –

- Tai Jia, King (c.1602–1590 BC)
- Bu Bing, King (c.1590–1588 BC)
- Tai Geng, King (c.1588–1563 BC)
- Xiao Jia, King (c.1563–1546 BC)
- Tai Wu, King (c.1546–1471 BC)

=== Asia: Southeast ===
Vietnam

- Hồng Bàng dynasty (complete list) –

- Khôn line, (c.1632–c.1431 BC)

=== Asia: West ===
- Hittite Empire: Old Kingdom complete list) –

- Zidanta I, King (c.1560–1550 BC])
- Ammuna, King (c.1550–1530 BC)
- Telepinu, King (1525–1500 BC)

- Tyre, Phoenecia (complete list) –

- Agenor, King (c.1500 BC)

- Assyria: Old Period (complete list) –

- Sharma-Adad II, King (1601–1598 BC)
- Erishum III, King (1598–1586 BC, traditional date, c.1580–1567 BC, newer dating)
- Shamshi-Adad II, King (1567–1561 BC)
- Ishme-Dagan II, King (1561–1545 BC)
- Shamshi-Adad III, King (1545–1529 BC)
- Puzur-Ashur III, King (1521–1498 BC)

- Old Babylonian Empire: Amorite dynasty (complete list) –

- Ammi-Ditana, King (1620–1583 BC)
- Ammi-Saduqa, King (1582–1562 BC)
- Samsu-Ditana, King (1562–1531 BC)

- Middle Babylonian period: Kassite dynasty, Third Dynasty of Babylon (complete list) –

- Agum II or Agum-Kakrime, King (c.1507 BC)
- Burnaburiash I, King (c.1500 BC), treaty with Puzur-Ashur III of Assyria
- Kashtiliash III, King (c.1500 BC)

- Ebla: Third Eblaite kingdom (complete list) –

- Indilimma, King (c.1600 BC)

- Elam: Sukkalmah dynasty (complete list) –

- Lila-irtash, King (fl.c.1710–1698 BC)
- Kuk-Nashur IV, King (fl.c.1710–1698 BC)
- Temti-Agun I, King (r.c.1698–1690 BC)
- Atta-mera-halki, King (fl.c.1710–1570 BC)
- Tata II, King (fl.c.1710–1580 BC)
- Temti-halki, King (fl.c.1710–1650 BC)
- Kutir-Shilhaha I, King (fl.c.1650–1625 BC)
- Kuk-Nashur II, King (mid 17th century BC)
- Kuk-Nashur III, King (fl.c.1646–1625 BC)
- Temti-Raptash, King (fl.c.1625–1605 BC)
- Tan-Uli, King (fl.c.1690–1600 BC)
- Sirtuh, King (fl.c.1605–1600 BC)
- Simut-wartash II, King (fl.c.1605–1595 BC)

== Europe: Balkans ==
- Athens —

- Cecrops I, legendary King (1556–1506 BC)
- Cranaus, legendary King (1506–1497 BC)
