= List of state leaders in the 17th century BC =

State leaders in the 18th century BC – State leaders in the 16th century BC – State leaders by year

This is a list of state leaders in the 17th century BC (1700–1601 BC).

== Africa: Northeast ==
Egypt: Second Intermediate Period

- Thirteenth Dynasty of the Second Intermediate Period (complete list) –

- Merneferre Ay, King (c. 1701–1677 BC)
- Merhotepre Ini, King (1677–1675 BC)
- Sankhenre Sewadjtu, King (1675–1672 BC)
- Mersekhemre Ined, King (c. 1670 BC)
- Sewadjkare Hori, King (c. 1666 BC)
- Merkawre Sobekhotep, King (c. 1662 BC)
- Mershepsesre Ini II, King (mid-17th century BC)
- Sewahenre Senebmiu, King (post-1660 BC)
- Merkheperre, King (c. 1650s BC)
- Merkare, King (c. 1650s BC)
- Sewadjare Mentuhotep, King (c. 1650s BC)
- Seheqenre Sankhptahi, King (c. 1650s BC)

- Fourteenth Dynasty of the Second Intermediate Period (complete list) –

- Sehebre, King (c. 1704–1699)

- Fifteenth Dynasty of the Second Intermediate Period (complete list) –

- Semqen, King (late-17th century BC)
- Aperanat, King (late-17th century BC)
- Sakir-Har, King (late-17th century BC)
- Khyan, King (c. 1610–1580 BC)

- Sixteenth Dynasty of the Theban region in Upper Egypt: Second Intermediate Period (complete list) –

- Djehuti, King (c. 1650 BC)
- Sobekhotep VIII, King (1645–1629 BC)
- Neferhotep III, King (1629–1628 BC)
- Seankhenre Mentuhotepi, King (1628–1627 BC)
- Nebiryraw I, King (1627–1601 BC)
- Nebiryraw II, King (c. 1600 BC)
- Semenre, King (c. 1600 BC)
- Bebiankh, King (c. 1600–1588 BC)

- Abydos Dynasty of the Second Intermediate Period (complete list) –

- Senebkay, King (17th century BC)
- Wepwawetemsaf, King (17th century BC)
- Pantjeny, King (17th century BC)
- Snaaib, King (17th century BC)

== Asia ==
=== Asia: East ===
China

- Shang, China (complete list) –

- Tang, King (c. 1675–1646 BC)
- Da Ding, possible King (17th century BC)
- Tai Jia, King (c. 1602–1590 BC)

=== Asia: South ===
India

Foundation Of Brihadratha Dynasty In Ancient Magadha(1700 BCE).

=== Asia: Southeast ===
Vietnam

- Hồng Bàng dynasty (complete list) –

- Ly line, (c. 1712–c. 1632 BC)
- Khôn line, (c. 1632–c. 1431 BC)

=== Asia: West ===
Assyria

- Assyria: Early Assyrian period (complete list) –

- Bel-bani, King (1700–1691 BC)
- Libaya, King (1690–1674 BC)
- Sharma-Adad I, King (1673–1662 BC)
- Iptar-Sin, King (1661–1650 BC)
- Bazaya, King (1649–1622 BC)
- Lullaya, King (1621–1618 BC)
- Shu-Ninua, King (1615–1602 BC)
- Sharma-Adad II, King (1601–1599 BC)

Babylonia

- Old Babylonian Empire (complete list) –

- Hammurabi, King (1728–1686 BC)
- Samsu-iluna, King (1686–1648 BC)
- Abi-Eshuh, King (1648–1620 BC)
- Ammi-Ditana, King (1620–1583 BC)

Ebla

- Ebla: Third Eblaite kingdom (complete list) –

- Indilimma, King (c. 1600 BC)

Elam

- Elam: Sukkalmah dynasty (complete list) –

- Lila-irtash, King (fl. c. 1710–1698 BC)
- Atta-Merra-Halki, King (unknown)
- Tata II, King (unknown)
- Lila-Irtash, King (unknown)
- Temti-Agun, King (unknown)
- Kutir-Shilhaha, King (unknown)
- Kuk-Nashur III, King (c. 1646 BC)
- Temti-Raptash, King (unknown)
- Shimut-Wartash II, King (unknown)
- Shirtuh, King of Susa (unknown)

Hittite Empire

- Hittite Empire (complete list) –

- Pithana, King (c. 17th century BC)
- Piyusti, King (c. 17th century BC)
- Anitta, King (c. 17th century BC)
- Tudhaliya, King (c. 17th century BC)
