= Shamshi-Adad =

Shamshi-Adad may refer to:

- Shamshi-Adad I, a 18th century BC ancient Near East Amorite ruler of the Kingdom of Upper Mesopotamia.
- Shamshi-Adad II, an Old Assyrian king who ruled in the mid-second millennium, ca. 1585-1580 BC (short chronology).
- Shamshi-Adad III, King of Assyria from 1545 BC to 1529 BC. He was the son of Ishme-Dagan II.
- Shamshi-Adad IV, King of Assyria, 1054/3–1050 BC, the 91st to be listed on the Assyrian Kinglist.[i 1][i 2] He was a son of Tukultī-apil-Ešarra I (1114–1076 BC), the third to have taken the throne, after his brothers Ašarēd-apil-Ekur and Ashur-bel-kala, and he usurped the kingship from the latter's son, the short-reigning Erība-Adad II (1055–1054 BC).
- Shamshi-Adad V, King of Assyria from 824 to 811 BC.
