= Seneferankhre =

Egyptian pharaoh

Pepi IV
- Seneferankhre Pepy
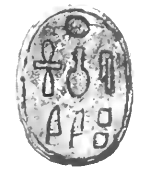
- Photograph of a scarab of Sneferankhre Pepi IV by Flinders Petrie.

Pharaoh
- Reign: uncertain chronological position
- Predecessor: uncertain, Bebiankh (Helck), Nubankhre (von Beckerath)
- Successor: uncertain, Nebmaatre (Helck), Anather (von Beckerath)
Royal titulary
Prenomen
Seneferankhre Pepy
S.nfr-ˁnḫ-Rˁ-Pjpj
He who causes life to be beautiful, Ra, Pepi
N33 s nfr anx p p i i
Nomen
Pepy
Pjpj
Pepi
p p i i
- Dynasty: 16th dynasty

Seneferankhre Pepi IV may have been a pharaoh of the 16th Dynasty during the Second Intermediate Period. The name is only known from a scarab seal without cartouche.

Pro. According to Wolfgang Helck he was the fifth pharaoh of the dynasty. Alternatively, according to Jürgen von Beckerath, he was the thirteenth pharaoh of the dynasty. Because his position in the 16th Dynasty is highly uncertain, it is not clear who were his predecessor and successor.

Contra. Seneferankhre Pepi IV is only attested by a scarab-shaped seal bearing his name. Egyptologist Kim Ryholt contests the seal as evidence that Pepi was a king of the 16th Dynasty, positing that the seal does not date to the Second Intermediate Period (SIP). According to Ryholt: "the size and design (prenomen + nomen without cartouche or royal titulary/epithets) of this seal is unparalleled during the SIP. Also the style of the signs is quite dissimilar to SIP seals." Instead, Ryholt proposes that the seal of Seneferankhre Pepi IV be dated to the First Intermediate Period, noting however that this is a very early date for a scarab seal, since otherwise the earliest scarabs appear only with the reign of Senusret III of the late 12th Dynasty.
