= Seuserenre =

The term Seuserenre refers to the prenomens or royal names of two Egyptian pharaohs:

- Seuserenre Khyan of the 15th Hyksos dynasty
- Seuserenre Bebiankh, a native Theban king during the Second Intermediate Period. He is given a reign of 12 years in the Turin Canon
