= Nebiriau =

Nebiriau may refer to:

- Nebiriau I, Egyptian pharaoh, reigned 1627-1601 BC
- Nebiriau II, Egyptian pharaoh who succeeded Nebiriau I
