= Ashur-nirari I =

- Issi'ak Assur

King of Assur
- Reign: c. 1547–1522 BC
- Predecessor: Shamshi-Adad III
- Successor: Puzur-Ashur III
- Issue: Puzur-Ashur III
- Father: Ishme-Dagan II

Aššur-nārāri I, inscribed ^{m}aš-šur-ERIM.GABA, "Aššur is my help," was an Old Assyrian king who ruled for 26 years during the mid-second millennium BC, c. 1547 to 1522 BC. He was the 60th king to be listed on the Assyrian Kinglist and expanded the titles adopted by Assyrian rulers to include muddiš, "restorer of," and bāni, "builder of," to the traditional epithets ensi, "governor," and iššiak, "vice-regent," of Aššur.

== Succession and contemporaries ==
He was the son of Išme-Dagān II, and succeeded his brother Šamši-Adad III to the throne, ruling for twenty six years, an identification that all three Assyrian Kinglists (Khorsabad, (Note: Khorsabad Kinglist, tablet IM 60017 (excavation nos.: DS 828, DS 32-54) ii 36.) SDAS (Note: SDAS Kinglist, tablet IM 60484, ii 28.) and Nassouhi (Note: Nassouhi Kinglist, Istanbul A. 116 (Assur 8836), ii 32.)) agree on. The Synchronistic Kinglist (Note: Synchronistic Kinglist, Ass 14616c, KAV 216, i 21.) gives his Babylonian contemporary as Kaštil[...], possibly identified as Kaštiliašu III, the son and (eventual) successor of Burna-Buriyåš I, the Kassite kings of Babylon during the period when the dynasty was beginning to exert control over southern Mesopotamia.

== Reign and Construction projects ==
Evidence of his construction activities survives, with four short inscriptions commemorating work building the temple of Bel-ibrīia on bricks recovered from an old ravine, restoring the Abaru forecourt and rebuilding the Sîn-Šamaš (Moon-god/Sun-god) temple, called the é.ḫúl.ḫúl.dir.dir.ra, “House of Surpassing Joys,” which would be later restored by Tukulti-Ninurta I and Aššur-nāṣir-apli II. He ruled in a peaceful and uneventful period of Assyrian history following the overthrow of the Babylonians and Amorites by Puzur-Sin c. 1732 BC and the rise of the Mitanni in the 1450s BC. He was succeeded by his son Puzur-Aššur III.

== Inscriptions ==
Preceded by Šamši-Adad III	King of Assyria; 1547–1522 BC	Succeeded by Puzur-Aššur III
