= Senusret =

F12 S29 D21 X1 O34 n
Senusret
in hieroglyphs
Era: Middle Kingdom
(2055–1650 BC)

Senusret (Greek: Sesostris; also transcribed as Senwosret based on Coptic; and as Usertesen in older literature) is the name of several Ancient Egyptians:

- Senusret I, pharaoh (12th Dynasty)
- Senusret II, pharaoh (12th Dynasty)
- Senusret III, pharaoh (12th Dynasty)
  - Sesostris, pharaoh described by Herodotus, possibly to be identified with one or more of the above
- Senusret IV, pharaoh (13th or 16th Dynasty)
- Senusret (vizier)
- Senusret (nomarch), 12th Dynasty nomarch at Elkab
