= Wosret =

Ancient Egyptian goddess

- Image of Wosret with a spear, harpoon, bow and arrows, ankh and a Was-sceptre on her head.
Name in hieroglyphs
R19 s t t f D2 B1
- Major cult center: Thebes
- Symbol: bow and arrow, Spear, Was-sceptre

Genealogy
- Spouse: Amun
- Children: Khonsu (When Equated With Mut)

Wosret, Waset, or Wosyet meaning "the powerful female one" was an Egyptian goddess whose cult was centered on Thebes in Upper Egypt and her name was the same as the Egyptian name of the city, Waset. She was a minor goddess, but three pharaohs during the Twelfth Dynasty plus an additional one during the second intermediate peroiod incorporated her name into theirs: Senwosret, or Senusret, means "man of Wosret".

Wosret was rarely depicted, and no temples to her have been identified. When she was depicted, it was wearing a tall crown with the Was "power" sceptre (which was related to her name) upon her head and carrying other weapons such as spears and a bow and arrows.

She was Amun's first wife (John Ray calls her "the theological equivalent of the girl next door"), and was replaced by Mut, although it is possible that Mut is simply a later name for Wosret.

== See also ==
- Amunet
