= Anat-her =

Ancient Egyptian king

- 'Anat-Har, Anather
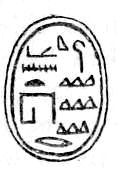
- Drawing of the scarab seal of Anat-her.

Heka-chasut ?
- Reign: unknown duration, may not have been a ruler
- Predecessor: If a ruler, possibly the first member of the 16th Dynasty (von Beckerath).
- Successor: 'Aper-'Anati (von Beckerath)
Royal titulary
Nomen
S38 q N25 N25 N25 a n t h r
Ḥq3-ḫ3swt-ˁnt-ḥr
Ruler of the foreign lands, Anat is content
- Dynasty: uncertain dynasty, 16th Dynasty (von Beckerath)

Anat-her (also 'Anat-Har) may have been the first ruler of the Sixteenth Dynasty of Egypt, reigning over some part of Lower Egypt during the Second Intermediate Period as a vassal of the Hyksos kings of the 15th Dynasty. This is contested however, with the Egyptologists Kim Ryholt and Darrel Baker believing that 'Anat-Har was a Canaanite chieftain contemporary with the powerful 12th Dynasty. Others such as Nicholas Geoffrey Lempriere Hammond contend that he was a prince of the 15th Dynasty. 'Anat-Har's name means "Anat is content" and refers to the Semitic goddess Anat, showing that he was of Canaanite descent.

== Attestations ==
'Anat-Har is attested by two scarab-seals, one of which is made of steatite and possibly originates from Bubastis in the Nile Delta. 'Anat-Har is not listed in the Turin canon, a king list redacted during the Ramesside period and which serves as primary historical source for the kings of the Second Intermediate Period.

== Ruler, prince or chieftain ==
=== Ruler ===
The seals credit 'Anat-Har with the title of Heka-chasut, "Ruler of the foreign lands", the title born by the early Hyksos kings. Consequently, Jürgen von Beckerath proposed that 'Anat-Har was a member of the 16th Dynasty and a vassal of the Hyksos kings of the 15th Dynasty. The interpretation of the 16th Dynasty as regrouping vassals of the Hyksos is debated however, with some Egyptologists including Ryholt, Darrell Baker and Janine Bourriau believing that the 16th Dynasty ruled an independent Theban kingdom c. 1650–1580 BC.

=== Prince ===
These seals are significant for 'Anat-Har's name is not found within a cartouche and there is no evidence, therefore, that he reigned as pharaoh. Nicholas Geoffrey Lempriere Hammond therefore proposed that he may simply have been an Hyksos prince under the authority of the 15th dynasty at Avaris

=== Chieftain ===
Following the lack of cartouche, Kim Ryholt also argues that 'Anat-Har never reigned as a ruler of Lower Egypt. Furthermore Ryholt points to the style and design of 'Anat-Har's seals which are typically of seals produced during the 12th Dynasty. Thus Ryholt argues that 'Anat-Har was a Canaanite chieftain contemporary with this dynasty and who may have had commercial relations with Egypt. According to Ryholt the title of Heka-chasut, which constitutes the main argument for a 15th Dynasty date, is also found in seals of the 12th and 14th Dynasties and cannot be used to precisely date 'Anat-Har's life.

== See also ==
- List of pharaohs
