= Amu (pharaoh) =

Amu was the nineteenth and last pharaoh of the Hyksos Sixteenth Dynasty of Egypt. preceded by Yoam.

== See also ==
- List of pharaohs
