= Merkare =

Egyptian pharaoh

Pharaoh
- Reign: unknown duration, some time between 1663 BC and 1649 BC
- Predecessor: Merkheperre
- Successor: [name lost]
Royal titulary
Prenomen
Merkare
Mr-k3-Rˁ
Beloved Ka of Ra
< N5 mr r D28 Z1 >
- Dynasty: 13th dynasty

Merkare was an Egyptian pharaoh of the late 13th Dynasty of Egypt during the Second Intermediate Period reigning for a short while, some time between 1663 BC and 1649 BC.

== Reign ==
As a pharaoh of the 13th Dynasty, Merkare would have reigned either over Upper Egypt from Thebes or over Middle and Upper Egypt from Memphis. At the time, the Eastern Nile Delta was under the domination of the 14th Dynasty.

According to the egyptologist Kim Ryholt, no less than 17 kings of the 13th Dynasty reigned in the short time period from 1663 BC until 1649 BC. Scholars, such as Manfred Bietak and Ryholt proposed that this instability is a consequence of a prolonged famine and perhaps a plague which struck at least the Delta region and lasted until the end of the 13th and 14th Dynasty states c. 1650 BC. The weakened state of both kingdoms may explain, in part, why they fell rapidly to the emerging Hyksos power c. 1650 BC.

== Attestation ==
Merkare's only attestation is the Turin canon, a king list compiled in the early Ramesside period. According to the egyptologist Kim Ryholt, the canon gives his prenomen on the 8th column, 18th line (Gardiner entry 7.23). The Turin papyrus is damaged on the section covering the late 13th dynasty and Merkare's reign length is lost in a lacuna and also his successor's nomen and prenomen is lost into history.

The exact chronological position of Merkare is not known for certain as the damaged state of the Turin canon only allows for conjectural reconstructions of the late 13th Dynasty. According to Ryholt he was the forty-eighth ruler of the dynasty, while Baker and von Beckerath see him as the forty-seventh.

Preceded by Merkheperre	Pharaoh of Egypt; Thirteenth Dynasty	Succeeded by lost
