= Neferhotep III =

Egyptian pharaoh of the 13th or 16th dynasty

Sekhemre Sankhtawy Neferhotep III
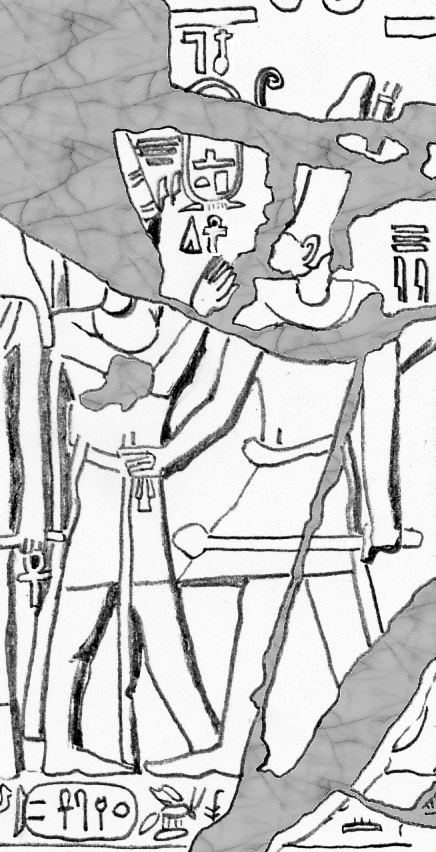
- Neferhotep III (right) on the stela JE 59635

Pharaoh
- Reign: 1 year c. 1629-1628 BC
- Predecessor: Sobekhotep VIII
- Successor: Seankhenre Mentuhotepi
Royal titulary
Horus name
Wadjkhaw
W3ḏ-ḫˁ.w
Flourishing of appearances
G5	wAD xa a
Nebty name
Aapheti
ˁ3-pḥtj
Great of strength
G16	aA a Y1 F9 t y A24
Golden Horus
Men...
bik nbw mn...
The golden falcon, stable of...
G8	mn Y1 hatching
Prenomen
Sekhemre Seankhtawy
Sḫm-Rˁ-sˁnḫ-t3.w(j)
The might of Ra, who nourishes the two lands
M23 t L2 t < ra sxm s anx N19 >
Nomen
Neferhotep
Nfr-ḥtp
Perfect and content
G39 N5 < nfr Htp t p >
- Dynasty: 16th Dynasty

Sekhemre Sankhtawy Neferhotep III Iykhernofret was the third or fourth ruler of the Theban 16th Dynasty, reigning after Sobekhotep VIII according to Egyptologists Kim Ryholt and Darrell Baker. He is assigned a reign of 1 year in the Turin Canon and is known primarily by a single stela from Thebes. In an older study, Jürgen von Beckerath dated Neferhotep III to the end of the 13th Dynasty.

== Attestation ==
=== Stela, Cairo JE 59635 ===
In the heavily damaged stela (Cairo JE 59635 [CG 20799]), Neferhotep III repeatedly calls Thebes "my city" and praises himself as "the guide of victorious Thebes".

This emphasis on Thebes is understood by Ryholt as showing that Neferhotep III reigned exclusively over the Theban region. Additionally, Baker points out the total lack of contemporary attestations for kings of the 16th Dynasty (except Bebiankh and Nebiryraw I) outside of a 200 km long stretch of the Nile valley comprising Thebes, from Hu in the north to Edfu in the south. That Neferhotep III ruled over little more than the Theban region is further strengthened by a stela of Neferhotep's successor Seankhenre Mentuhotepi where Mentuhotepi states "I am the king within Thebes, this is my city".

=== Non-contemporary attestations ===
==== Turin King List ====
The Turin King List 11:3 mentions "The Dual King Sekhemra S... 1 year ...", usually identified with Sekhemre Sankhtawy Neferhotep III. In the list he is preceded by 11:2 Sekhemra [...] 16 years and succeeded by 11:4 Se...en...ra 1 year.

== Reign ==
In his Theban stela, Neferhotep III emphasizes his role as provider of food for his people stating that "he who nourishes his city, saving it from famine". This, together with his royal name Sekhemre Sanhktawy, The might of Ra, who nourishes the Two Lands is a strong sign that Upper Egypt suffered from famines during the late 16th Dynasty. Another king of the period, Senusret IV, adopted a similar royal name.

Neferhotep III got certainly embroiled in a defensive war against the Hyksos 15th Dynasty, which would ultimately overrun the 16th Dynasty state. Neferhotep praises himself on his stela as " He who raises his city, having been sunk through strife with foreigners". The stela is thought to contain the earliest known mention of the Khepresh crown. Neferhotep is said to be "Adorned with the Khepresh, the living image of Re, lord of terror". For reasons which remain difficult to understand, on the stela Neferhotep III is also referred to by the epithet Iykhernofret written inside a cartouche:

< M18 T28 r nfr t Z2 >

After his short reign, he was succeeded by a similarly short lived king Seankhenre Mentuhotepi.

Preceded by Sobekhotep VIII	Pharaoh of Egypt; Sixteenth Dynasty of Egypt	Succeeded by Seankhenre Mentuhotepi
