= Nikare II =

Egyptian pharaoh

- Nekare, Nykare, Nekara, Nikara
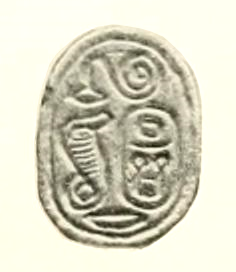
- Scarab of Nikare in the British Museum (EA 38569).

Pharaoh
Royal titulary
Nomen
Nikare
< N5 n D28 >
n k3 rˁ
- Dynasty: 16th dynasty

Nikare II was a pharaoh of the Sixteenth Dynasty of Egypt. He is attested by some scarabs belonging to the British Museum, to the Petrie Museum, and to the Fraser collection.

This king should not be confused with Nikare, another pharaoh who reigned several centuries earlier.
