= Merkheperre =

Pharaoh of the 13th dynasty of Egypt

- Mercheperre, Ra-mer-kheper
- Scarab seal of pharaoh Merkheperre, now in the British Museum BM EA 42204.

Pharaoh
- Reign: unknown duration, some time between 1663 BC and 1649 BC
- Predecessor: Mer[...]re (Ryholt) or Mershepsesre Ini II (von Beckerath)
- Successor: Merkare
Royal titulary
Prenomen
Merkheperre
Mr-ḫpr-Rˁ
Beloved manifestation of Ra
< N5 mr r L1 >
- Dynasty: 13th dynasty

Merkheperre was an Egyptian pharaoh of the late 13th Dynasty of Egypt during the Second Intermediate Period reigning some time between 1663 BC and 1649 BC. As such, Merkheperre would have reigned either over Upper Egypt from Thebes or over Middle and Upper Egypt from Memphis. At the time, the Eastern Nile Delta was under the domination of the 14th Dynasty.

== Attestations ==
Merkheperre appears on the Turin canon, a king list compiled in the early Ramesside period. According to the egyptologist Kim Ryholt, the canon gives his prenomen on the 8th column, line 17 (Gardiner entry 7.22). The Turin papyrus is damaged on the section covering the late 13th Dynasty and Merkheperre's reign length is lost in a lacuna.

Merkheperre is also attested by two artefacts dating to his reign: a glazed weight of grey schist bearing his cartouche, now in the Petrie Museum UC 16372 and a scarab inscribed with his name. Although the scarab is accepted as evidence of Merkheperre by Darrell Baker, Jürgen von Beckerath, Stephen Quirke and others, Kim Ryholt rejects this attribution. Ryholt points to its lack of royal attributes and insignia as well as its stylistic features which depart from other royal seals of the 13th Dynasty. Rather, Ryholt proposes that the scarab simply represents Khepri pushing the sun.

== Chronological position ==
The exact chronological position of Merkheperre is not known for certain as the damaged state of the Turin canon only allows for conjectural reconstructions of the late 13th dynasty. According to Ryholt he was the forty-seventh ruler of the dynasty, while Baker sees him as the forty-sixth and von Beckerath as the fifty-seventh. All agree that he was succeeded by Merkare, however von Beckerath proposed that his predecessor was Mershepsesre Ini II, when a new reconstruction of the Turin canon led Ryholt and Baker to propose that his predecessor was Mer[...]re.

Preceded by Mer[...]re	Pharaoh of Egypt; Thirteenth Dynasty	Succeeded by Merkare
