= Nebmaatre =

Egyptian pharaoh

Nebmaatre I
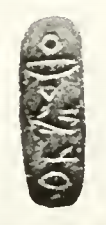
- Base of the lion amulet of Nebmaatre, now in the Petrie Museum (UC 11587).

Pharaoh
- Reign: unknown duration
- Predecessor: Rahotep?
- Successor: Sobekemsaf I?
Royal titulary
Prenomen
Netjer Nefer Nebmaatre
Nṯr-nfr-nb-m3ˁt-Rˁ
The good god, the lord of truth is Ra
R8 F35 < N5 nb U4 a t >
- Dynasty: uncertain dynasty, possibly early 17th dynasty or late 16th dynasty

Nebmaatre is the prenomen of a poorly attested ruler of the late Second Intermediate Period of Ancient Egypt. Nebmaatre may have been a member of the early 17th Dynasty and as such would have reigned over the Theban region. Alternatively, Jürgen von Beckerath believes that Nebmaatre was a ruler of the late 16th Dynasty.

== Attestations ==
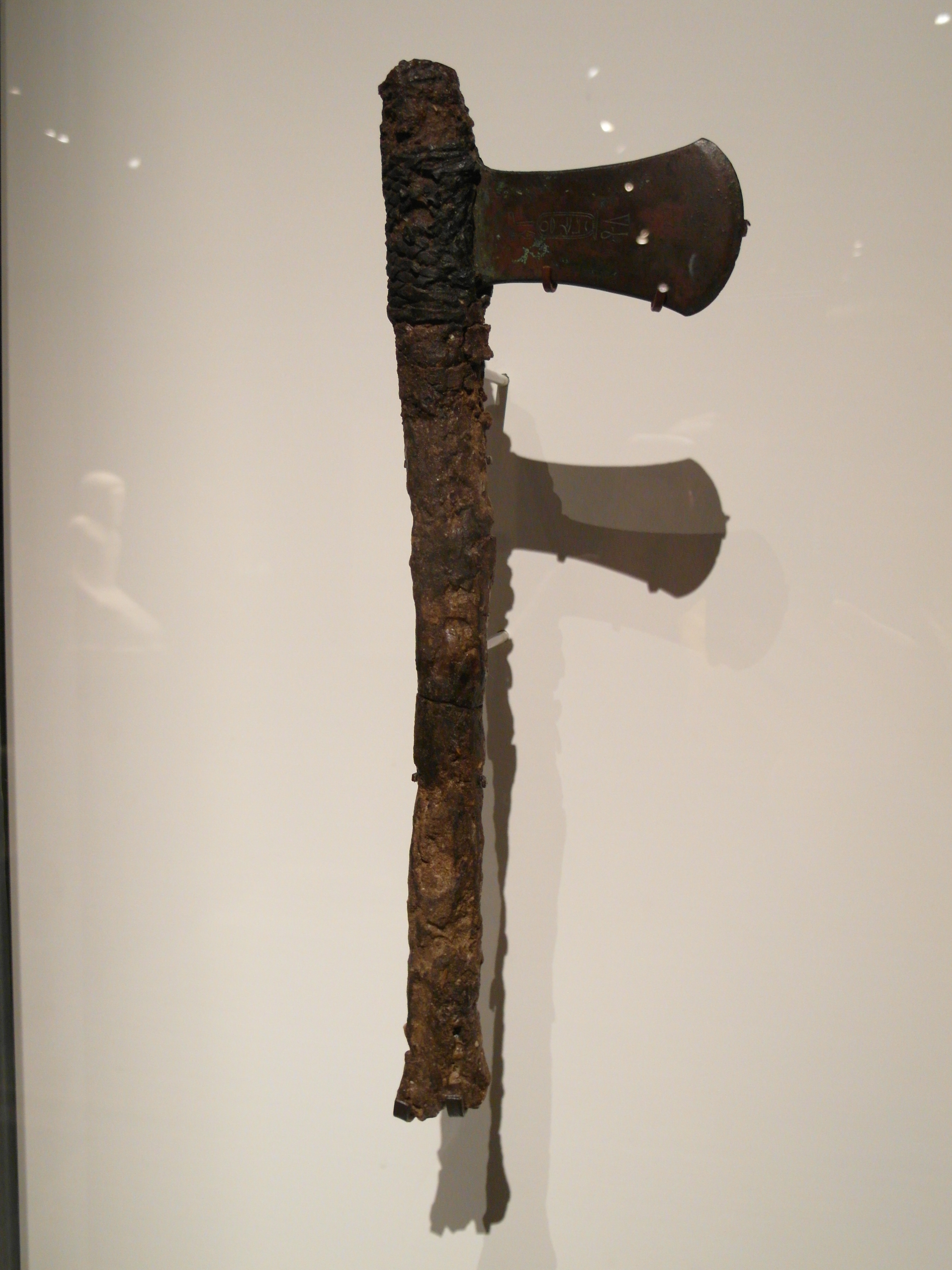
Axe with the inscription of Nebmaatre

The prenomen Nebmaatre is attested on a bronze axe-head discovered in a tomb at Mostagedda in Middle Egypt and now in the British Museum under the catalog number BM EA 63224. The same prenomen is inscribed on a black steatite amulet representing a lion of unknown provenance and now in the Petrie Museum under the catalog number 11587. A degree of uncertainty affects the ownership of these artifacts since Amenhotep III's prenomen was Nebmaatre as well. However, the axe-head can be dated to the late Second Intermediate Period based on stylistic grounds and provenance while according to Flinders Petrie the amulet is of too rough a workmanship to be attributable to Amenhotep III. Instead, Petrie suggested that the amulet be attributable to Ibi, an obscure ruler of the late 13th Dynasty whose prenomen is partially preserved in the Turin canon as "[...]maatre". However, Kim Ryholt's recent study of the Turin canon precludes this identification as a vertical stroke in the lacuna just prior to "maatre" rules out the hieroglyph for "neb".

== Chronological position ==
The chronological position of Nebmaatre in the Second Intermediate Period is highly uncertain. The Egyptologist Jürgen von Beckerath proposes that Nebmaatre was a ruler of a compounded 15th–16th Dynasty, which he sees as an entirely Hyksos line of kings. Alternatively, Kim Ryholt put forth the hypothesis that Nebmaatre was a king of the 17th Dynasty, although he left his position in the dynasty unspecified. Ryholt's datation is based on the observation that the axe-head bearing Nebmaatre's name was found in a tomb belonging to the Pan-Grave culture. Egyptologist Darrell Baker points out that the Theban rulers of the period might indeed have provided such weapons to their mercenaries.
