= Seankhenre Mentuhotepi =

Egyptian pharaoh

- Montuhotepi, Mentuhotep VII
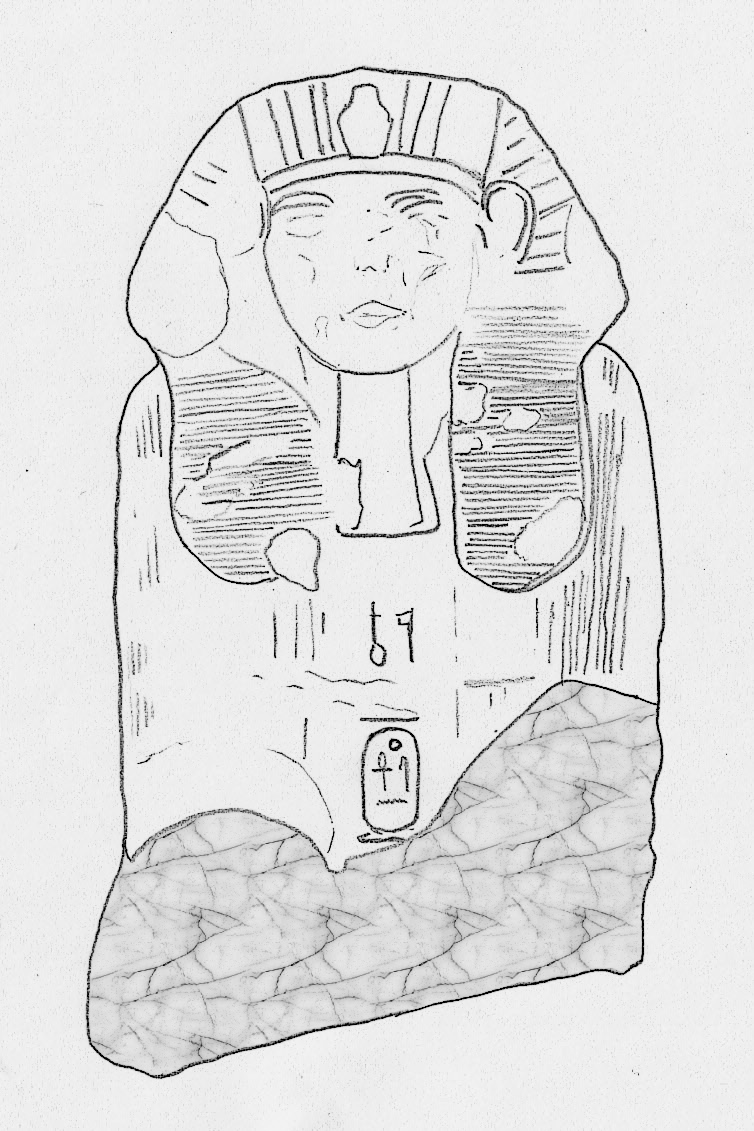
- Drawing of a sphinx of Mentuhotepi, bearing the prenomen Seankhenre between the legs

Pharaoh
- Reign: 1 year c. 1628-1627 BC
- Predecessor: Neferhotep III (Ryholt), Djehuti (von Beckerath)
- Successor: Nebiryraw I (Ryholt & von Beckerath)
Royal titulary
Prenomen
Seankhenre
S-ˁnḫ-n-Rˁ
He whom Ra causes to live
M23 t L2 t < N5 s S34 n >
Nomen
Mentuhotepi
Mn-ṯw-ḥtpi
Montu is content
G39 N5 < Y5 N35 V13 w i R4 X1 Q3 >
Variant:
G39 N5 < Y5 N35 V13 w R4 i >
- Burial: unknown, probably in Dra' Abu el-Naga'
- Dynasty: 16th Dynasty or 17th Dynasty

Seankhenre Mentuhotepi was an ancient Egyptian pharaoh during the fragmented Second Intermediate Period.

== Attestations ==
Mentuhotepi is attested by a stela from Karnak and a scarab seal of unknown provenance bearing a prenomen variously read Sewahenre, Sewadjenre and Seankhenre.

At Edfu, two limestone sphinxes of Mentuhotepi were discovered in 1924 in the ruins of the Temple of Horus, one bearing the prenomen Seankhenre and the other the nomen Mentuhotepi.

=== Non-contemporary attestations ===
==== Turin King List ====
The Turin King List 11:4 preserves "The Dual King Se[…]enre-[…] {s-...-n-rꜤ-...} … 1 year…". This may be restored as the prenomen Seankhenre.

== Reign ==
If Ryholt's identification of Mentuhotepi in the Turin canon is correct, then he took the throne following Sekhemre Sankhtawy Neferhotep III and reigned for only 1 year. Mentuhotepi's short reign was probably marked by the constant conflict with the Hyksos kingdom of the 15th Dynasty. At the time, the 16th Dynasty was already in a weakened position and reigned over little more than Thebes itself. In his stela from Karnak, Mentuhotepi emphatically states: "I am the king within Thebes, this is my city" and calls Thebes the "mistress of the entire land, city of triumph". He reports driving back the "foreign lands", probably a euphemism for the Hyksos or possibly for the Nubians. Mentuhotepi's military might is emphasized, the king being likened to Sekhmet who kills his enemies with his "flaming breath". Mentuhotepi was succeeded by Nebiryraw I, who ruled Upper Egypt for over 25 years.

== Theories ==
The identification of Mentuhotepi has evolved over the years: Jürgen von Beckerath lists Mentuhotepi as a king of the 17th Dynasty under the name Mentuhotep VII and Wolfgang Helck as Mentuhotep VI. The recent reconstruction of the Turin canon by Ryholt established this king as Seankhenre Mentuhotepi.

According to the Egyptologists Kim Ryholt and Darrell Baker, he was the fifth king of the 16th Dynasty reigning over the Theban region in Upper Egypt. Alternatively, Jürgen von Beckerath sees him as the fifth king of the 17th Dynasty.

Preceded by Neferhotep III	Pharaoh of Egypt; Sixteenth Dynasty of Egypt	Succeeded by Nebiryraw I
