= Puzur-Ashur III =

- Issi'ak Assur

King of Assur
- Reign: 24 or 14 regnal years c. 1521–1498 BC
- Predecessor: Ashur-nirari I
- Successor: Enlil-nasir I
- Issue: Enlil-nasir I
- Father: Ashur-nirari I

Puzur-Ashur III was the king of Assyria from c. 1521 BC to 1498 BC. According to the Assyrian King List, he was the son and successor of Ashur-nirari I and ruled for 24 years (or 14 years, according to another copy). He is also the first Assyrian king to appear in the synchronistic history, where he is described as a contemporary of Burnaburiash of Babylon. A few of his building inscriptions were found at Assur. He rebuilt part of the temple of Ishtar in his capital, Ashur, and the southern parts of the city wall.

Preceded by Ashur-nirari I	King of Assyria; 1521–1498 BC	Succeeded by Enlil-nasir I
