= Sekhemre Shedwaset =

Egyptian pharaoh known only from Turin canon

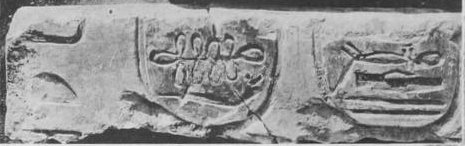
- Partial cartouches of Sekhemre Shedtawy Sobekemsaf II, sometimes identified with Sekhemre Shedwast

Pharaoh
- Predecessor: Bebiankh
- Successor: Sekhemre-Wepmaat Intef (if of the 17th Dynasty; disputed)
Royal titulary
Prenomen
Turin King List
< ra sxm Sd d A24 wAs t niwt R13 >
Sekhemre-Shed-Waset
Sḫm Rˁ-šd-W3st
the Might of Re which rescues Thebes
- Consort: Nubkhaes II (disputed)
- Children: Sekhemre-Wepmaat Intef (disputed)
- Dynasty: 16th Dynasty

Sekhemre Shedwaset was a native ancient Egyptian pharaoh of the 16th Theban Dynasty during the Second Intermediate Period.

== Reign ==
King Sekhemre Shedwast is not attested in archaeology, but only appears as a name in the Turin King List. His name associates him directly to the city of Waset/Thebes, during a time when Egypt was fragmented into rival kingships. It is often speculated that his name is a variant of Sekhemre Shedtawy which would refer more broadly to the "two lands", i.e. the entire land.

His throne name Sekhemre Shedwast, translates literally as "the Might of Re which rescues Thebes", while his personal name is unknown.

== Attestations ==
=== Non-contemporary attestations ===
==== Turin King List ====
The Turin King List 11:9 from the time of Ramesses II mentions: "Dual King, Sekhemre Shedwaset (cartouche), x years...". His name can translate as "the Powerful One of Ra, who has rescued Thebes" or "Powerful/Mighty Ra, Rescuer of Waset/Thebes". He is after 11:8 Seuserenre often identified as Bebiankh, and before 11:10 [...]ra.

His name can be broken up into word-concepts:

- Sekhem refers to "form" and the concept of soul/spirit. The sekhem scepter was a symbol of authority. It also refer to power/mighty.
- Ra refers to the god of the Sun and the king/father of the gods.
- Shed was the god of rescue also known as "the Savior", depicted as a child or young prince.
- Waset was the ancient Egyptian name of Thebes.

== Theories ==
=== Identification ===
It has been suggested, but not universally accepted, that Sekhemre Shedwast may be identical to Sekhemre Shedtawy Sobekemsaf II, since their throne names are similar. If so, he may have been married to queen Nubkhaes II and they may have had a son named Sekhemre-Wepmaat Intef.
