= Aperanat =

Ancient Egyptian king

'Aper-'Anati
- Aperanat, Aper-Anat
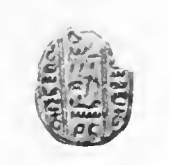
- Scarab seal of 'Aper-'Anati made of glazed steatite. London, Petrie Museum.

Heqa-Khasut
- Reign: unknown duration
- Predecessor: Semqen (Ryholt) or Anat-her (von Beckerath)
- Successor: Sakir-Har (Ryholt) or Semqen (von Beckerath)
Royal titulary
Nomen
Heka-chasut 'Aper-'Anati
Ruler of the foreign lands, dust of Anat(in west semitic language)
Ḥq3-ḫ3swt ˁpr-ˁnti
S38 q N25 Z2 apr r a n ti i
- Dynasty: uncertain dynasty, possibly 15th Dynasty, otherwise 16th Dynasty

'Aper-'Anati (also written Aper-Anat and Aperanat) was a ruler of Lower Egypt during the Second Intermediate Period in the mid-17th century BC. According to Jürgen von Beckerath, he was the second king of the 16th Dynasty and a vassal of the Hyksos kings of the 15th Dynasty. This opinion was rejected by Kim Ryholt. In his 1997 study of the Second Intermediate Period, Ryholt argues that the kings of the 16th Dynasty ruled an independent Theban realm c. 1650–1580 BC. Consequently, Ryholt sees 'Aper-'Anati as an early Hyksos king of the 15th Dynasty, perhaps its second ruler. This analysis has convinced some Egyptologists, such as Darrell Baker and Janine Bourriau, but not others including Stephen Quirke.

'Aper-'Anati is only known from a single scarab-seal, now in the Petrie Museum. On the scarab he is given the title of Heka-chasut, which translates as "Ruler of the Foreign Lands" and from which the word Hyksos is derived. Significantly, this title was borne by the early Hyksos kings of the 15th Dynasty. Based on this evidence, Ryholt tentatively proposes that 'Aper-'Anati was the second ruler of the 15th Dynasty, but points out that this identification is not certain.
