= Semqen =

Egyptian pharaoh

- Šamuqēnu, Sem-qen
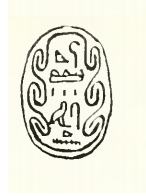
- Drawing of the scarab seal of Semqen.

Heqa-Khasut
- Reign: some time between 1649 BC and 1621 BC (Ryholt)
- Predecessor: founder of the dynasty (Ryholt) or 'Aper-'Anati (von Beckerath)
- Successor: uncertain, 'Aper-'Anati (Ryholt) or Sakir-Har (von Beckerath)
Royal titulary
Nomen
Heka-khasut Semqen
Ḥq3-ḫ3swt-smqn
Ruler of the foreign lands, Semqen
S38 q N25 Z2 s m q n
- Dynasty: uncertain dynasty, most likely 15th Dynasty, otherwise 16th Dynasty

Semqen (also Šamuqēnu) was a Hyksos ruler of Lower Egypt during the Second Intermediate Period in the mid-17th century BC. According to Jürgen von Beckerath he was the third king of the 16th Dynasty and a vassal of the Hyksos kings of the 15th Dynasty. This opinion was shared by William C. Hayes and Wolfgang Helck but recently rejected by Kim Ryholt. In his 1997 study of the Second Intermediate Period, Ryholt argues that the kings of the 16th Dynasty ruled an independent Theban realm c. 1650–1580 BC. Consequently, Ryholt sees Semqen as an early Hyksos king of the 15th Dynasty, perhaps its first ruler. This analysis has convinced some Egyptologists, such as Darrell Baker and Janine Bourriau, but not others including Stephen Quirke.

== Attestations ==
Semqen's only contemporary attestation is a brown steatite scarab-seal from Tell el-Yahudiyeh in the Nile Delta. Significantly, the seal gives him the title of Heka-khasut, "Ruler of the foreign lands", a title exclusively associated with the early Hyksos rulers. Furthermore, the design of the seal indicates that it was likely produced either during the 14th or the 15th Dynasty, the latter being much more probable.

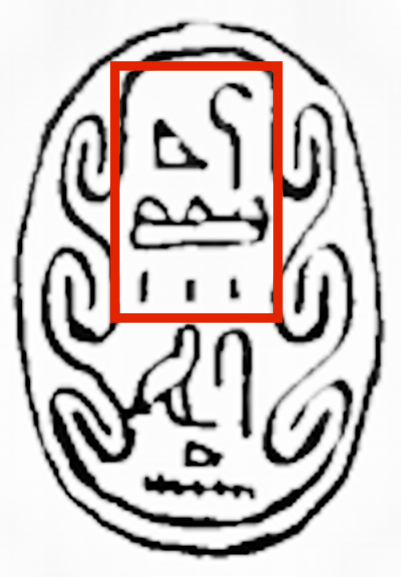
"Hyksos" on the seal of king Semqen.

The original location of the seal, the title it is inscribed with and its design led Ryholt to propose that Semqen belonged to the early 15th Dynasty, although he also points to the conjectural nature of this proposition. Ryholt further adds that the title Heka-khasut, even if securely dated to the 15th Dynasty, may not have been borne only by the rulers of this dynasty.

Once belonging to the Fraser collection, the scarab seal is currently part of a private collection.
