= Ishme-Dagan II =

- Issi'ak Assur

King of Assur
- Reign: 16 years c. 1579–1564 BC
- Predecessor: Shamshi-Adad II
- Successor: Shamshi-Adad III
- Issue: Shamshi-Adad III
- Father: Shamshi-Adad II

Ishme-Dagan II or Išme-Dagān II, inscribed ^{m}iš-me ^{d}da-gan and meaning “(the god) Dagan has heard,” was a rather obscure ruler of Assyria, sometime during the first half of the 16th century BC in the midst of a dark age (Edzard's "dunkles Zeitalter"), succeeding his father, Shamshi-Adad II, and in turn succeeded by Shamshi-Adad III from whose reign extant contemporary inscriptions resume. According to the Assyrian Kinglist, he reigned sixteen years.

== Succession line ==
He belonged to the so-called Adasi dynasty, founded by the last of seven usurpers who succeeded in the turmoil following the demise of Shamshi-Adad I’s Amorite dynasty. He is only known from king lists. The relationship with his successor is uncertain as the copies describe Shamshi-Adad III's father as Ishme-Dagan, the brother of Sharma-Adad II, who was in turn the son of Shu-Ninua. This Ishme-Dagan, however, has his filiation clearly given as son of Shamshi-Adad II. This led Yamada to suggest that Shamshi-Adad III's father was a different homonymous individual from a collateral line of descent from Shu-Ninua.

Preceded by Shamshi-Adad II	King of Assyria; 1579–1564 BC	Succeeded by Shamshi-Adad III
