= Senusret (nomarch) =

Ancient Egyptian Nomarch

- Nomarch of the 3rd nome of Upper Egypt
- Successor: Bah Hor-aa
- Dynasty: 12th Dynasty
- Burial: Elkab
- Children: Bah Hor-aa

Senusret with the second name Djaty was an ancient Egyptian official dating to the early 12th Dynasty. He was a local governor (a nomarch) of the nome of Nekhen, and is so far only known from his rock-cut tomb at Elkab, where he was buried. The tomb chapel was finely decorated with paintings. The preserved decorations in the chapel show Senusret hunting with bow and arrow or accompanied by his wife, as well as agricultural scenes. In his tomb chapel also appear his son Bah Hor-aa who was most likely his successor.
