= Sixteenth Dynasty of Egypt =

Ancient Egyptian dynasty

- 1649 BC–1582 BC
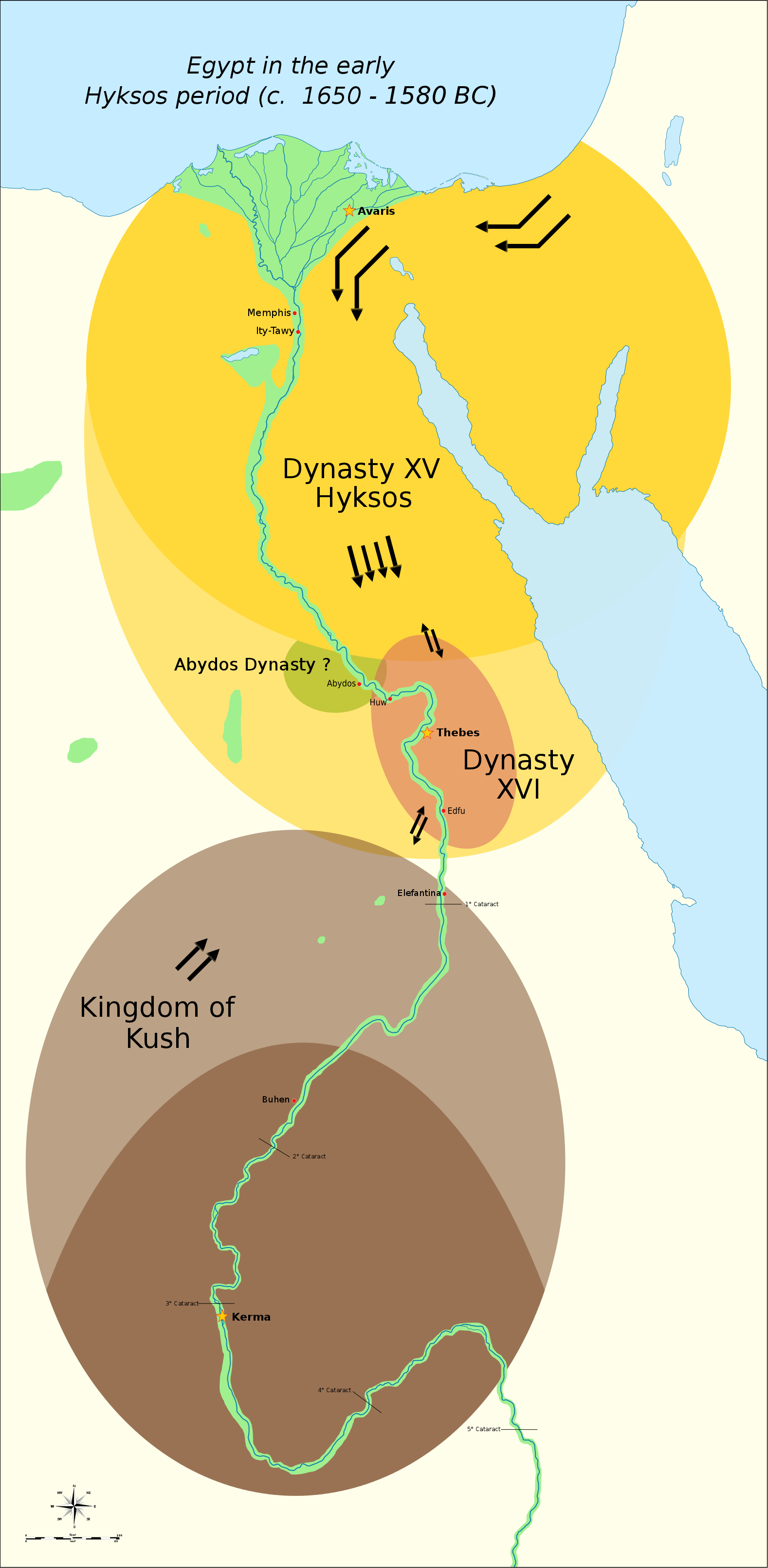
- The political situation in Egypt during the existence of the 16th Dynasty from c. 1650 until c. 1590 BC.
- Capital: Thebes
- Common languages: Egyptian language
- Religion: ancient Egyptian religion
- Government: Absolute monarchy
- Historical era: Second Intermediate Period of Egypt
  - Established: 1649 BC
  - Disestablished: 1582 BC
| Preceded by | Succeeded by |
| Fourteenth Dynasty of Egypt; Thirteenth Dynasty of Egypt | Seventeenth Dynasty of Egypt |

The Sixteenth Dynasty of ancient Egypt (notated Dynasty XVI) was a dynasty of pharaohs that ruled the Theban region in Upper Egypt for 70 years.

This dynasty, together with the 15th and 17th dynasties, are often combined under the group title, Second Intermediate Period (c. 1650–1550 BC), a period that saw the division of Upper and Lower Egypt between the pharaohs at Thebes and the Hyksos kings of the 15th Dynasty based at Avaris.

== Identification ==
Of the two chief versions of Manetho's Aegyptiaca, the Sixteenth Dynasty is described by the more reliable Africanus (supported by Syncellus) as "shepherd [hyksos] kings", but by Eusebius as Theban.

Ryholt (1997), followed by Bourriau (2003), in reconstructing the Turin canon, interpreted a list of Thebes-based kings to constitute Manetho's Sixteenth Dynasty, although this is one of Ryholt's "most debatable and far-reaching" conclusions. For this reason other scholars do not follow Ryholt and see only insufficient evidence for the interpretation of the Sixteenth Dynasty as Theban.

== History ==
The continuing war against 15th Dynasty dominated the short-lived 16th Dynasty. The armies of the 15th Dynasty, winning town after town from their southern enemies, continually encroached on the 16th Dynasty territory, eventually threatening and then conquering Thebes itself. In his study of the Second Intermediate Period, the Egyptologist Kim Ryholt has suggested that Dedumose I sued for a truce in the latter years of the dynasty, but one of his predecessors, Nebiryraw I, may have been more successful and seems to have enjoyed a period of peace in his reign.

Famine, which had plagued Upper Egypt during the late 13th Dynasty and the 14th Dynasty, also blighted the 16th Dynasty, most evidently during and after the reign of Neferhotep III.

== Kings ==
Various chronological orderings and lists of kings have been proposed by scholars for this dynasty. These lists fall broadly in two categories: those assuming that the 16th Dynasty comprised vassals of the Hyksos, as advocated by Jürgen von Beckerath and Wolfgang Helck; and those assuming that the 16th Dynasty was an independent Theban kingdom, as recently proposed by Kim Ryholt.

=== As vassals of the Hyksos ===
The traditional list of rulers of the 16th Dynasty regroups kings believed to be vassals of the Hyksos, some of which have semitic names such as Semqen and Anat-her. The list of kings differs from scholar to scholar and it is here given as per Jürgen von Beckerath's Dynasty XV/XVI in his Handbuch der ägyptischen Königsnamen. Wolfgang Helck, who also believes that the 16th Dynasty was an Hyksos vassal state, proposed a slightly different list of kings. Many of the rulers listed here in the 16th Dynasty under the hypothesis that they were vassals of the Hyksos are put in the 14th Dynasty in the hypothesis that the 16th Dynasty was an independent Theban kingdom. The chronological ordering is largely uncertain.

Dynasty XV/XVI as vassals of the Hyksos
| Name of king | Dates | Comments |
|---|---|---|
| 'Anat-Har | | Possibly a prince of the 15th Dynasty or a Canaanite chieftain contemporary with the 12th Dynasty |
| 'Aper-'Anati | | May belong to the early 15th Dynasty |
| Semqen | | May belong to the early 15th Dynasty |
| Sakir-Har | | May belong to the early 15th Dynasty |
| Apepi | | May be identical with the Hyksos ruler Apepi |
| Maaibre Sheshi | | May belong to the early 14th Dynasty |
| Yaqub-Har | | May belong to the late 14th Dynasty |
| Jamu | | |
| Jakebmu | | |
| Amu | | |
| Sneferankhre Pepi IV | | |
| Hepu | | |
| Anati | | |
| Bebnum | | |
| Nebmaatre | | May belong to the 17th Dynasty |
| Aahotepre | | Possibly the same person as 'Ammu |
| Anetrire | | |
| Meribre | | |
| Nubankhre | | Kingship contested |
| Nikare II | | Kingship contested |
| [...]kare | | |
| [...]kare | | |
| [...]kare | | |
| Sharek | | May belong to the 15th Dynasty, only attested in later sources |
| Wazad | | Most likely belongs to the 14th Dynasty |
| Qur | | Possibly Qareh, may belong to the 14th Dynasty |
| Shenes | | Likely to be Sheneh rather than Shenes; may belong to the 14th Dynasty |
| Inek | | |
| 'A[...] | | |
| 'Ap[epi] | | |
| Hibe | | |
| Aped | Uncertain reading | |
| Hapi | | |
| Shemsu | | |
| Meni[...] | | |
| Werqa | | |

=== As an independent Theban Kingdom ===
In his 1997 study of the Second Intermediate Period, the Danish Egyptologist Kim Ryholt argues that the 16th Dynasty was an independent Theban kingdom. From Ryholt's reconstruction of the Turin canon, 15 kings can be associated to the dynasty, several of whom are attested by contemporary sources. While most likely rulers based in Thebes itself, some may have been local rulers from other important Upper Egyptian towns, including Abydos, El Kab and Edfu. By the reign of Nebiriau I, the realm controlled by the 16th Dynasty extended at least as far north as Hu and south to Edfu. Not listed in the Turin canon (after Ryholt) is Wepwawetemsaf, who left a stele at Abydos and was likely a local kinglet of the Abydos Dynasty.

Ryholt gives the list of kings of the 16th Dynasty as shown in the table below. Others, such as Helck, Vandersleyen, Bennett combine some of these rulers with the Seventeenth Dynasty of Egypt. The list of rulers is given here as per Kim Ryholt and is supposedly in chronological order:

Dynasty XVI as an independent Theban kingdom
| Name of king | Image | Dates | Comments |
|---|---|---|---|
| Unknown | | 1649–1648 BC | Name lost in a lacuna of the Turin canon |
| Sekhemre Sementawy Djehuty | | 1648–1645 BC | |
| Sekhemre-seusertawi Sobekhotep VIII | | 1645–1629 BC | |
| Sekhemre-seankhtawi Neferhotep III | | 1629–1628 BC | |
| Seankhenre Mentuhotepi | | 1628–1627 BC | |
| Sewadjenre Nebiryraw I | | 1627–1601 BC | |
| Nebiryraw II | | 1601 BC | |
| Semenre | | 1601–1600 BC | |
| Bebiankh | | 1600–1588 BC | |
| Sekhemre Shedwaset | | 1588 BC | |
| Unknown | | 1588–1582 BC | Five kings lost in a lacuna of the Turin canon |

Additional kings are classified as belonging to this dynasty per Kim Ryholt but their chronological position is uncertain. They may correspond to the last five lost kings on the Turin canon:

Dynasty XVI as an independent Theban kingdom (uncertain order)
| Name of king | Image | Dates | Comments |
|---|---|---|---|
| Djedhotepre Dedumose I | | | May have tried to sue the Hyksos for peace |
| Djedneferre Dedumose II | | | |
| Djedankhre Montemsaf | | | |
| Merankhre Mentuhotep VI | | | |
| Seneferibre Senusret IV | | | Left a colossal statue of himself in Karnak |

== Comparison of regnal lists ==
The sixteenth dynasty is rarely recorded on surviving king lists due to the period between the end of the Middle Kingdom and the beginning of the New Kingdom being skipped over on most lists. The Turin King List originally included a list of fifteen kings with individual reign lengths, however the papyrus is now in a fragmentary state and much of the information is now lost. Manetho's Aegyptiaca would have originally contained information on this dynasty but the work as a whole is now lost, and portions of the king list only exist in quotations. According to the version of Aegyptiaca quoted by Sextus Julius Africanus, the sixteenth dynasty was made up of "32 shepherd kings for 518 years" while the version quoted by Eusebius stated the dynasty had "5 kings of Thebes for 190 years".

The Karnak King List included some names of kings from this dynasty, but the list itself is in a fragmentary condition, and the names on the original list were not placed in regnal order.

| Historical Pharaoh | Karnak King List | Turin King List | Turin List Reign Length |
|---|---|---|---|
| ? | | Name lost | Lost |
| Sekhemre Sementawy Djehuty | Sekhemre Sementawy | Sekhemra [...] | 3 years |
| Sobekhotep VIII | Seusertawy | Sekhemra [...] | 16 [years] |
| Neferhotep III | | Sekhemra S[...] | 1 year |
| Seankhenre Mentuhotepi | | Se[...]en[...]ra [...] | 1 year |
| Nebiryraw I | Sewadjenre | Nebiriawra | 26 years |
| Nebiryraw II | | Nebitawra [...] | Lost |
| Semenre | | Semenra | Lost |
| Bebiankh | Seuserenre | Seuserenra [...] | 12 years |
| Sekhemre Shedwaset | Sekhem..re | Sekhemra Shedwaset | Lost |
| ? | | [...]ra [...] | Lost |
| ? | | Name lost | Lost |
| ? | | [...]ra [...] | Lost |
| ? | | Name lost | Lost |
| ? | | Name lost | Lost |
| Senusret IV | Senefer(ib)re | – | – |
| Seneferankhre? | Senefer..re | – | – |

| Preceded by Fifteenth Dynasty | Dynasty of Egypt; 1649–1582 BC | Succeeded by Seventeenth Dynasty |
