= Shamshi-Adad III =

- Issi'ak Assur

King of Assur
- Reign: c. 1563–1548 BC
- Predecessor: Ishme-Dagan II
- Successor: Ashur-nirari I
- Father: Ishme-Dagan II

Shamshi-Adad III was the King of Assyria from c. 1563 BC–1548 BC. He was the son of Ishme-Dagan II. He is known from an inscription where he reports having repaired two of the ziggurats.

Preceded by Ishme-Dagan II	King of Assyria; 1563–1548 BCE	Succeeded by Ashur-nirari I
