= Nebiryraw II =

Egyptian pharaoh

- Nebiryerawet, Nebiriau
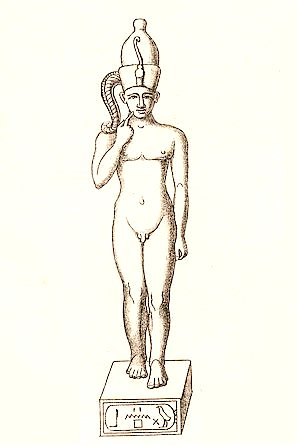
- Statuette of Harpocrates from the Ptolemaic period, believed to bear the throne name of Nebiryraw II

Pharaoh
- Reign: c.1600 BC
- Predecessor: Nebiryraw I
- Successor: Semenre
Royal titulary
Prenomen
Neferkare(?)
Nfr-k3-Rˁ
Beautiful is the ka of Ra
R8 nfr < N5 nfr kA >
Nomen
Nebiryraw<re>
<Rˁ>Nb-jrj-(r)-3w(t)
<Ra is> the possessor of all

G39 N5	N5 nb i r Z4 F40 Y1 Z2 HASH
- Father: Nebiryraw I?
- Dynasty: 16th Dynasty

Nebiryraw II (also Nebiriau II, Nebiryerawet II) was an ancient Egyptian pharaoh of the Theban-based 16th Dynasty, during the Second Intermediate Period.

== Identity ==
He is commonly assumed by some Egyptologists to be the son of his predecessor Nebiryraw I, given the rarity of the name Nebiryraw in Egyptian historical sources. Unlike his presumed father who ruled Upper Egypt for 26 years, he was an obscure king who is completely unattested by contemporary archaeological sources.

The only two non-contemporary attestations for Nebiryraw II are the mention of his personal name on the Ramesside Turin Canon (position 13.5, his throne name was lost), and a bronze statuette of the god Harpocrates (Cairo 38189). The four sides of the base of the statue were inscribed with the names written into cartouches; these are "Binpu", "Ahmose", "The good god Sewadjenre, deceased" and "The good god Neferkare, deceased" respectively. The first two were likely two princes of the royal family of the 17th Dynasty which would replace the 16th Dynasty shortly thereafter; Sewadjenre was the throne name of Nebiryraw I and finally, it is believed that Neferkare is the otherwise unattested throne name of Nebiryraw II. The finding is also peculiar because the cult of Harpocrates – and thus the statuette itself – dates back to the Ptolemaic period i.e. about 1500 years after the people named on the statuette had lived.

Nebiryraw II was succeeded by an equally obscure king named Semenre who is attested by a single axe – inscribed with his throne name – and then by Seuserenre Bebiankh who is given 12 years in the Turin Canon.

Preceded by Nebiryraw I	Pharaoh of Egypt; 16th Dynasty	Succeeded by Semenre
