= Shamshi-Adad II =

- Issi'ak Assur

King of Assur
- Reign: c. 1585–1580 BC
- Predecessor: Erishum III
- Successor: Ishme-Dagan II
- Issue: Ishme-Dagan II
- Father: Erishum III

Shamshi-Adad II or Šamši-Adad II, inscribed ^{m(d)}Šam-ši-^{d}IM, was an Old Assyrian king who ruled in the mid-second millennium BC, c. 1585–1580 BC. His reign falls within the "dark age" period of Assyrian history from which written records are scarce.

== Succession and contemporaries ==
=== Succession ===
There are no extant contemporary sources witnessing his reign. He was the son and successor of Erishum III and ruled for six years (6 MU.MEŠ) according to the Khorsabad (Note: Khorsabad Kinglist, tablet IM 60017 (excavation nos.: DS 828, DS 32-54) ii 30–31.) and the SDAS (Note: SDAS Kinglist, tablet IM 60484, ii 23.) copies of the Assyrian Kinglist, where he appears as the 57th name (the Nassouhi Kinglist (Note: Nassouhi Kinglist, Istanbul A. 116 (Assur 8836).) is poorly preserved in this part). He was succeeded by his son Ishme-Dagan II.

=== Contemporaries ===
The Synchronistic Kinglist (Note: Synchronistic Kinglist, Ass 14616c, KAV 216, i 11–18.) somewhat implausibly gives eight different early Kassite rulers as his contemporaries although only the first five and part of the sixth are legible. These are Agum IGI ašu, Kaštil[...]šu, Abirataš, Kaštilyašu, Tazzigurumaš, and Harba[...]. Brinkman argues that this is a stylistic device and points to the previous reign of Irišum III who is shown as contemporary to Ea-gâmil, the last king of the Sealand Dynasty and Gandaš, the first of the Kassite Dynasty, despite the Chronicle of Early Kings (Note: Chronicle of Early Kings (ABC 20) BM 96152, tablet B, rev. 12–14.) recording that Ea-gâmil fled ahead of the army of Ulam-Buriaš, possibly the 12th Kassite king, at least a hundred years later.

== Inscriptions ==
Preceded by Erishum III	King of Assyria; 1585–1580 BC	Succeeded by Ishme-Dagan II
