= Senusret IV =

Egyptian Theban king

- Senusret IV Seneferibre
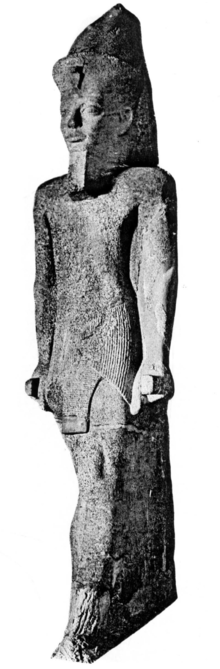
- Colossal statue CG 42026 of Senusret IV, discovered in 1901 by Georges Legrain in Karnak.

Pharaoh
- Reign: Year 1 II Shemu 1 (highest att.) late 17th to early 16th century BC
- Predecessor: uncertain, a king whose name is lost (von Beckerath) or Mentuhotep VI (new arrangement)
- Successor: uncertain, Mentuhotep VI (von Beckerath) or Wepwawetemsaf (new arrangement)
Royal titulary
Horus name
Wehemankh
Wḥm-ˁnḫ
Horus, repeating of life
G5	wHm anx
Nebty name
Sankhtawy
S-ˁnḫ-t3wj
He who nourishes the two lands
G16	s anx tA tA
Golden Horus
Neferkhaw
Nfr-ḫˁw
Beautiful of apparitions
G8	nfr xa Z2
Prenomen
Seneferibre
S.nfr-jb-Rˁ
He who delights the heart of Ra
M23 t L2 t < ra s nfr ib >
Nomen
Senusret
S(j) n Wsrt
The man of Wosret (litt. the strong one)
G39 N5 < wsr s D21 t z n >
- Dynasty: late 13th dynasty, 16th dynasty or early 17th dynasty

Senusret IV Seneferibre was an ancient Egyptian Theban king during the late Second Intermediate Period that is attested only through finds from Upper Egypt. The chronological position of Senusret IV is unclear and even the dynasty to which he belongs is debated.

== Attestations ==
The most important contemporary attestation of the king is a 2m 75 cm tall colossal statue of him, sculpted in pink granite and discovered in Karnak in 1901 by Georges Legrain. Other attestations include a block from El-Tod and the upper-right corner of a stela discovered in 1907 by Legrain in Karnak and which is inscribed with the date II Shemu 1 of the first regnal year of Senusret IV. Finally, a lintel from Edfu.

An axe-blade bearing the nomen Senusret have also been attributed to Senusret IV based on stylistic considerations. However, some have attributed it to Senusret I.

== Non-Contemporary Attestations ==
During the reign of Thutmose III, the Karnak king list #56(60) mentions "Senefer[...]re" which may be restored as Seneferibre, the prenomen of Senusret IV.

== Theories ==
According to Jürgen von Beckerath Senusret IV belonged to the late 13th Dynasty, while Kim Ryholt classifies him as a king of the 16th Dynasty with an uncertain position in the dynasty. Alternatively, Norbert Dautzenberg proposed that Senusret IV is part of the 17th Dynasty. Dautzenberg bases this hypothesis on his reading of entry 11.4 of the Turin canon as referring to Senusret IV. He also attributes graffiti on a gate of the Medamud temple mentioning a king "Senusret" to Senusret IV since the gate was decorated by Sobekemsaf I, who lived during the early 17th Dynasty. Both arguments are rejected by Ryholt: first, Ryholt notes that the Turin canon entry 11.4 is not compatible with Senusret IV's prenomen and second, he observes that the gate of the temple of Medamud was built by Senusret III so the graffiti is likely to refer to this king rather than Senusret IV. In the new arrangement the dynasty of Senusret IV is left partially undetermined, being simply categorized as late 13th to early 17th.
