= Semenre =

Theban pharaoh

- Smenre, Semenenre
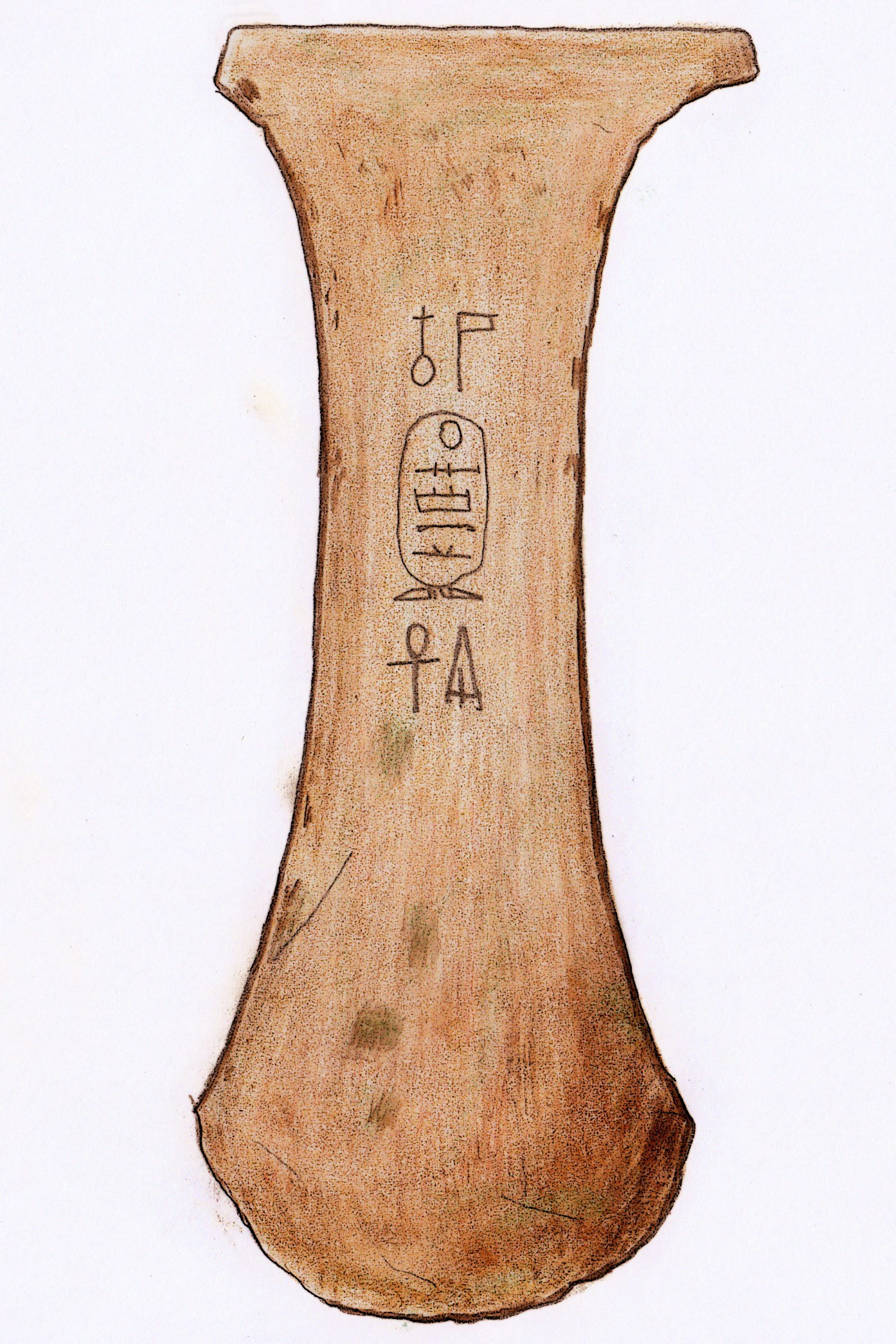
- Axehead with the name of Semenre, Petrie Museum UC30079

Ruler of Upper Egypt
- Reign: ca. 1600 BC or 1580 BC
- Predecessor: Nebiriau II
- Successor: Bebiankh
Royal titulary
Prenomen
Semenre
s.mn-rˁ
< N5 O34 mn n Y1 >
Turin Canon
Semenenre
Smn-n-Rˁ
He who is established by Ra
< N5 s mn n U32 Y1 n >
- Dynasty: 16th Dynasty or 17th Dynasty

Semenre (Smenre, Semenenre) is a poorly attested Theban pharaoh during the Second Intermediate Period of Egypt who succeeded the equally obscure Nebiriau II. He reigned from 1601 to 1600 BC (Kim Ryholt) or ca. 1580 BC (Detlef Franke) and belonged to the 16th Dynasty (Ryholt) or the 17th Dynasty (Franke).

== Attestation ==
Only the throne name is known for this ruler which was found carved on a tin-bronze axe head of unknown provenance, now in the Petrie Museum, London (UC30079).

=== Turin King List ===
The Turin Canon 11.7 mentions "Semenra" between Nebitawra (11.6) and Seuserenre (11.8). Semenre was succeeded by Seuserenre Bebiankh who left behind more traces of building projects and mining activity in his reign than most kings of this dynasty with the exception of Djehuti.

Preceded by Nebiriau II	Pharaoh of Egypt; Sixteenth Dynasty of Egypt	Succeeded by Bebiankh
