= Bebiankh =

Egyptian Pharaoh of the 16th or 17th dynasty

Seuserenre Bebiankh
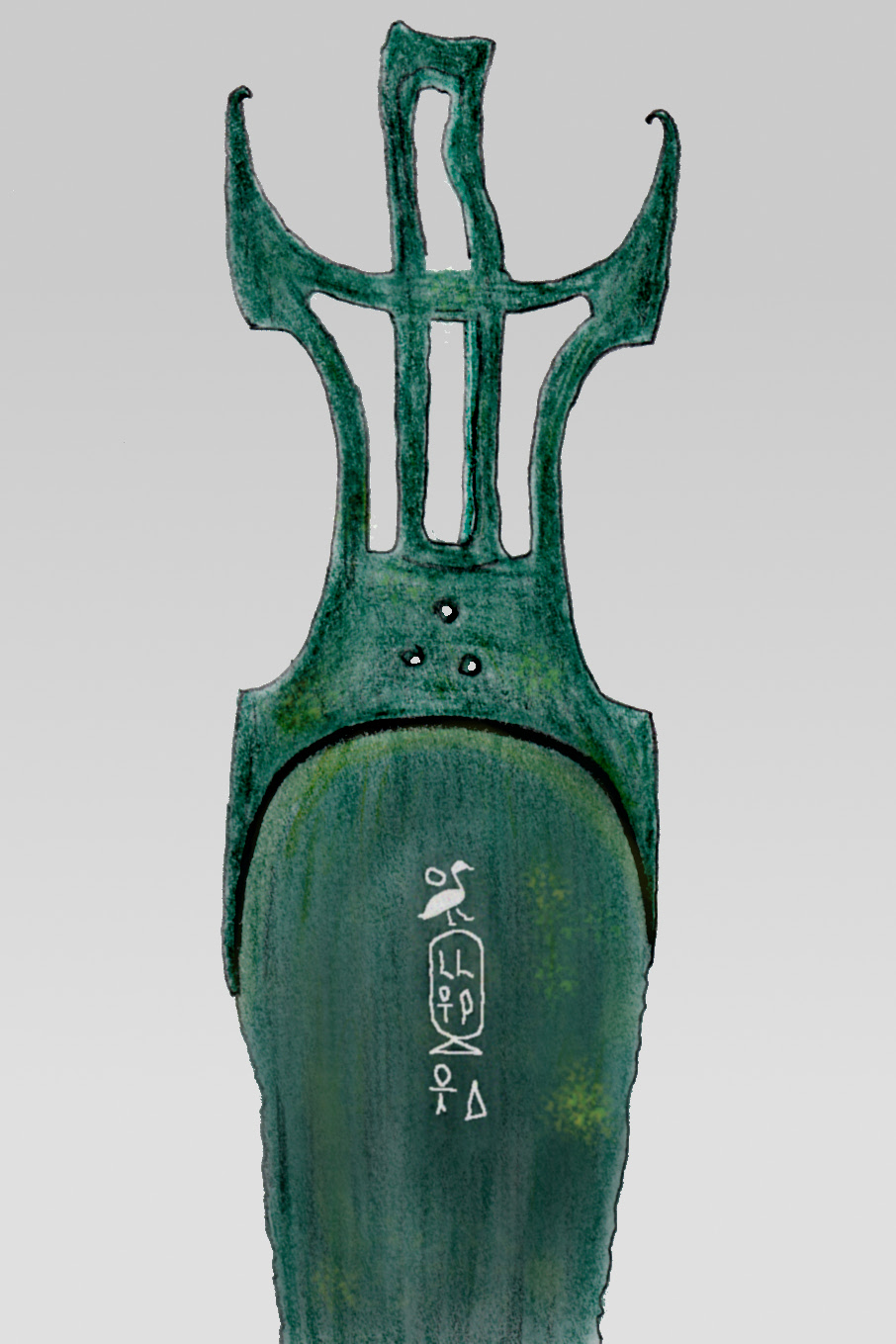
- Bronze dagger bearing the inscription "The son of Ra, Bebiankh, given life". British Museum EA 66062.

Pharaoh
- Reign: 12 years 1603-1591 BC; 1600-1588 BC
- Predecessor: Semenre
- Successor: Sekhemre Shedwaset or Seneferankhre (Helck)
Royal titulary
Prenomen
Seuserenre
S-wsr-n-Rˁ
He whom Ra causes to be strong
M23 t L2 t < N5 O34 wsr s n > G7
Karnak king list: Seuserenre
S-wsr-n-Rˁ
He whom Ra causes to be strong
< N5 O34 wsr s n >
Nomen
Bebiankh
Bbj-ˁnḫ
Bebi lives
< D58 D58 i S34 >
- Died: 1591 or 1588 BC
- Dynasty: 16th Dynasty

Seuserenre Bebiankh was a king in Upper Egypt during the Second Intermediate Period. He is often placed in the 16th Theban Dynasty and his prenomen or royal name is mentioned in the Turin King List with a reign of 12 years.

Based on an interpretation of the Turin King List, Bebiankh was succeeded either by a poorly known king named Sekhemre Shedwast. Also suggested is the equally shadowy ruler Seneferankhre Pepi IV.

== Attestations ==
Bebiankh is only attested in a small region of Upper Egypt.

At Gebel Zeit (Red Sea), a modest stela preserves his prenomen Seuserenre and nomen Bebiankh, attesting to mining activity in the nearby gelena mines. Mining expeditions to Gebel Zeit often departed from Coptos (Quft), cf. Minemhat of Coptos.

At Medamud, he built an extension to the Temple of Montu.

In Naqada, the nomen of Bebiankh is found on a bronze dagger with the inscription: Son of Ra, Bebiankh, given life.

=== Non-contemporary attestations ===
The Karnak King List from the time of Thutmose III mentions: 27. Se-user-en-re. Here he is placed between Nubkheperre and Senakhtenre.

The Turin King List 11:08 from the time of Ramesses II mentions: The Dual King Seuserenra reigned 12 years, months lost, x days. In the list he is preceded by 11:07 Semenra and succeeded by 11:09 Sekhemre Shedwaset, often interpreted as chronological.

The name Seuserenre consists of word-components: s-wsr-n-r'

- wsr which means "powerful".
- n can mean "of"
- r' refers to the sun-god Ra.

== Reign ==
Sobeknakht II inscription facsimile, after Davies 2003 p.53

A recently published historical inscription in Davies (2003) from the tomb of Sobeknakht II. Which describes a campaign into the Nile valley by a Nubian coalition of Lower Nubians, Upper Nubian islanders, Puntites and Medjay. It is dated to the reign of Seuserenre Bebiankh (or shortly afterwards) by Bennett (2002).

ḏd.t=i sḏm=tn ꜥnḫ.w tp-tꜣ n.t(i)t iy.t kꜣš ẖzi fgꜣ r-ꜣw=f snhp.n=f wḥw.wt wꜣwꜣ.t (ḥ)ꜣ(w)-nb.(w)t n.(i)w ḫnt-ḥn-nfr pwnt mḏꜣw.w
I said, “Listen you living ones upon earth, that vile Kush came, arousing its length, it having stirred up the tribes of Lower Nubia, the islanders of Upper Nubia, Punt and the Medjay.”

Preceded by Semenre	Pharaoh of Egypt; Sixteenth Dynasty of Egypt	Succeeded by Sekhemre Shedwaset
