= Second Intermediate Period of Egypt =

Period of ancient Egyptian history (1700–1550 BC)

The Second Intermediate Period
- c. 1700 BC–1550 BC
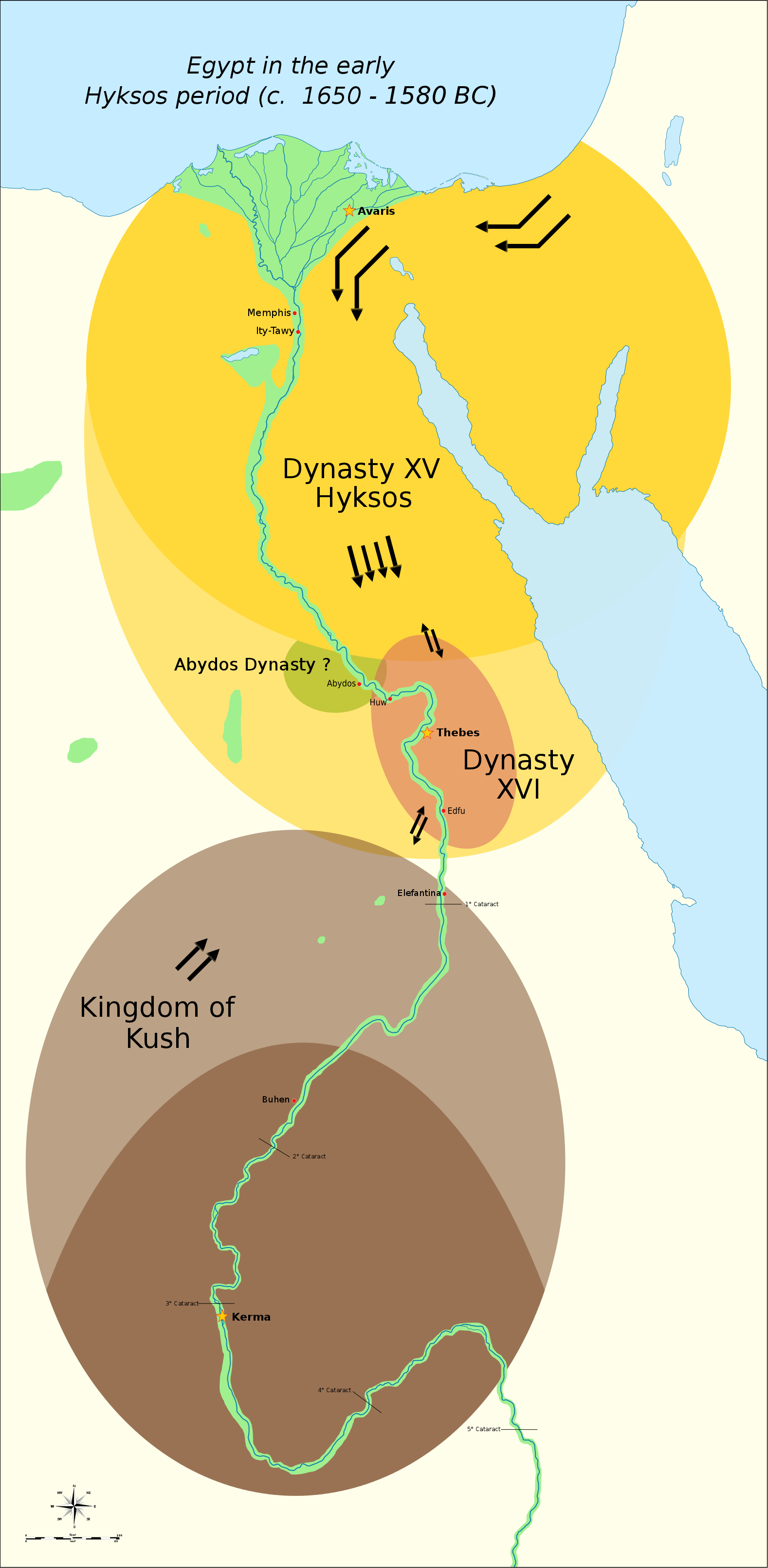
- The political situation in the Second Intermediate Period of Egypt (c. 1650 – c. 1550 BC)
- Capital: Itjtawy c.1803 – 1677 BC 13th Dynasty; Avaris c.1725 – 1535 BC 14th and 15th Dynasties; Thebes c.1677 – 1600 BC 13th, 16th and 17th Dynasties; Abydos c.1650 – 1600 BC Abydos Dynasty
- Religion: Ancient Egyptian religion
- Demonyms: Egyptians and Hyksos
- Government: Monarchy
- Pharaoh
  - c. 1701 – c. 1677 BC: Merneferre Ay (first)
  - c. 1555 – c. 1550 BC: Kamose (last)
- History
  - approximately around the late 13th Dynasty: c. 1700 BC
  - The end of the 17th Dynasty of Egypt: 1550 BC
Preceded by	Succeeded by
Middle Kingdom of Egypt	New Kingdom of Egypt

The Second Intermediate Period marks a period when ancient Egypt was divided into smaller dynasties for a second time, dating from 1782 to 1550 BC, between the end of the Middle Kingdom and the start of the New Kingdom. There is no universal agreement in Egyptology about how to define the period.

It is best known as the period when the Hyksos people of West Asia established the 15th Dynasty and ruled from Avaris, which, according to Manetho's Aegyptiaca, was founded by a king by the name of Salitis. The settling of these people may have occurred peacefully, although Manetho presents the Hyksos as "invaders of an obscure race" who conquered Egypt with brutality.

The Turin King List from the time of Ramesses II remains the primary source for understanding the chronology and political history of the Second Intermediate Period, along with studying the typology of scarabs, beetle-shaped amulets mass-produced in ancient Egypt and often inscribed with the names of rulers.

== History ==
=== Collapse of the Middle Kingdom ===
The 12th Dynasty of Egypt collapsed during the late 19th century BC with the death of Queen Sobekneferu. She had no heirs, causing the dynasty to come to an abrupt end, and with it, the most prosperous era of the Middle Kingdom; it was succeeded by the much weaker 13th Dynasty. According to the Byzantine chronicler George Syncellus, all three sources of the translated king list of Africanus, Eusebius, and the Armenian of Eusebius, state that the 13th Dynasty had sixty kings that ruled for roughly 153 years. Retaining the seat of the 12th Dynasty, the 13th Dynasty (c. 1773 – 1650 BC) ruled from Itjtawy ("Seizer-of-the-Two-Lands") for most of its existence.

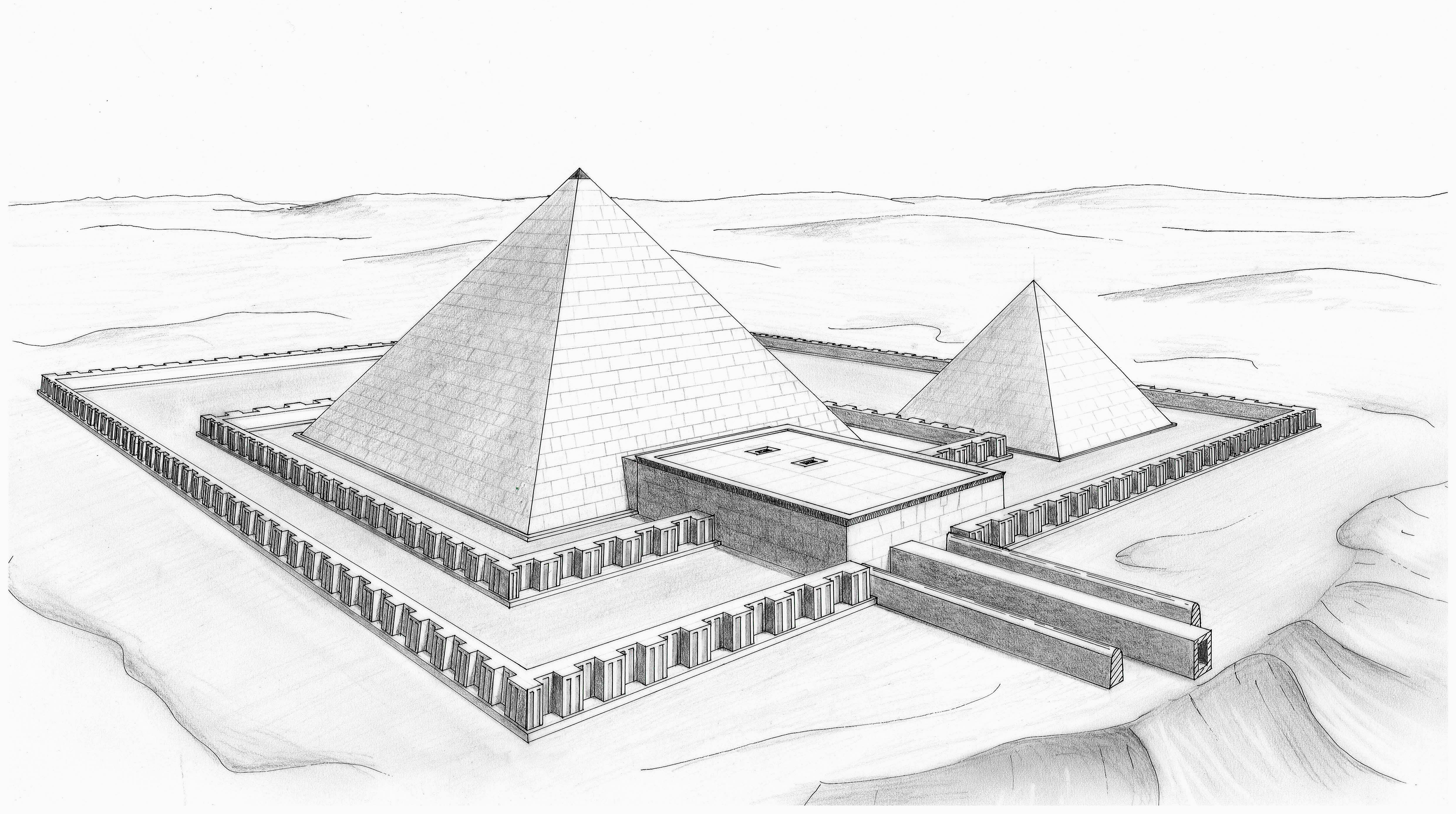
The pyramid of Khendjer is the only pyramid known to have been completed during the 13th Dynasty

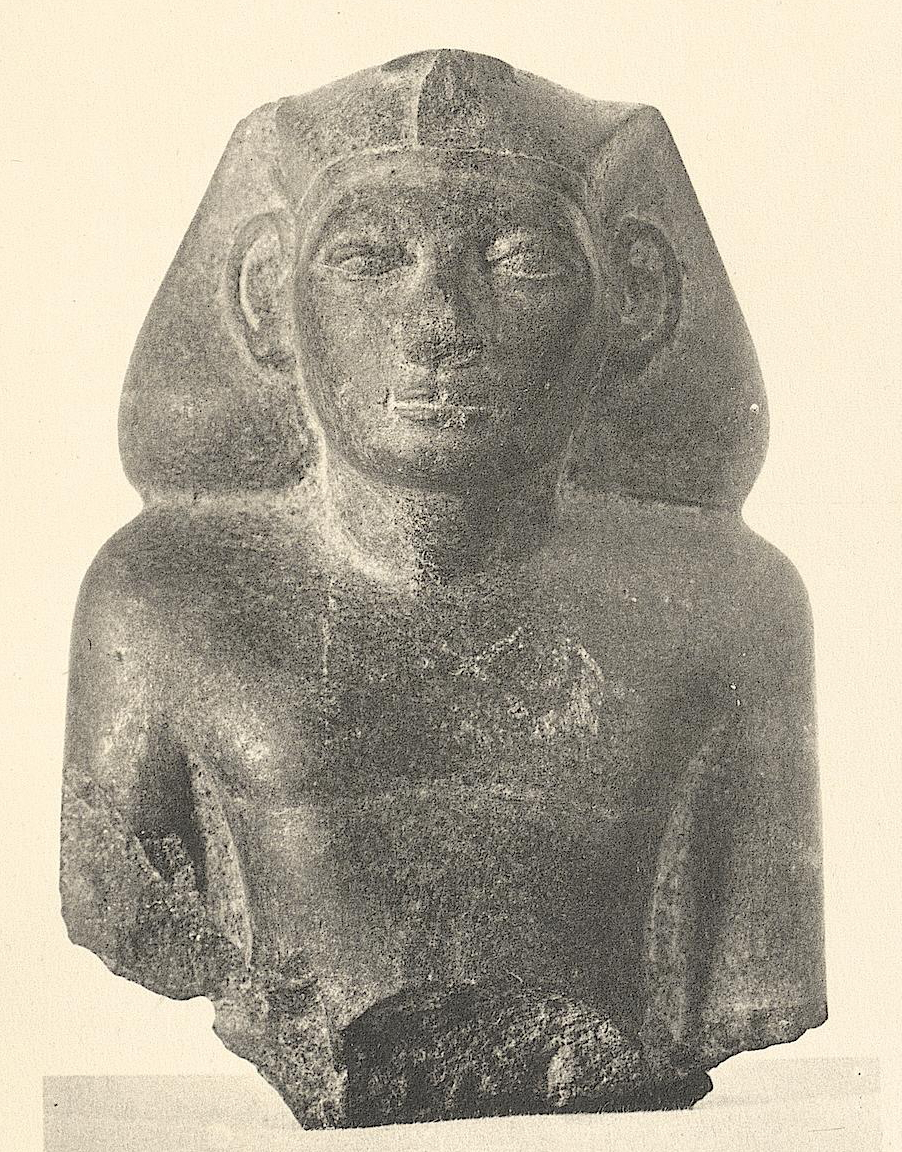
Upper part of a statue of pharaoh Khendjer from his pyramid complex

==== Migration to Thebes ====
The 13th Dynasty switched to Thebes in the far south possibly in the reign of Merneferre Ay. Daphna Ben Tor believes that this event was triggered by the invasion of the eastern Delta and the Memphite region by Canaanite rulers, who had their own culture, a variant of the contemporary late Palestinian Middle Bronze Age culture of the southern Levant. For some authors, this marks the end of the Middle Kingdom and the beginning of the Second Intermediate Period.

Though the 13th Dynasty controlled Upper Egypt, the 14th Dynasty ruled Lower Egypt, and both houses agreed to co-exist allowing trade. Evidently the rulers had trouble with securing power within their territory, being replaced in rapid fashion, but other factors like famine may have played a part. The eventual collapse of the 13th Dynasty became an opening for two smaller dynasties to take control of Egypt.

=== Transitional period ===
After allowing discipline at the southern forts to deteriorate, the government of the 13th Dynasty eventually withdrew its garrisons and, not long afterward, the forts were reoccupied by the rising Nubian state of Kush. An independent line of kings created the 14th Dynasty in the western Delta. In the north, Lower Egypt was overrun by the Hyksos, a Semitic people from across the Sinai. According to Manetho, invaders from the east seized Egypt "without striking a blow; and having overpowered the rulers of the land, they then burned our cities ruthlessly, razing to the ground the temples of gods..."

Similar to the First Intermediate Period of Egypt, the Second Intermediate Period was dynamic time in which rule of Egypt was roughly divided between rival power bases in Upper Egypt and Lower Egypt, each controlling a portion of land.

==== Fourteenth Dynasty ====
The 13th Dynasty proved unable to hold on to the entire territory of Egypt, and a provincial ruling family, located in the Nile Delta, broke away from the central authority to form the 14th Dynasty (c. 1700–1650 BC). According to Syncellus, all three sources agree that the 14th Dynasty had seventy-six kings and their court was located in Xois, now modern day Sakha. The precise borders of the 14th Dynasty state are not known, due to the general scarcity of its monuments. In his study of the Second Intermediate Period, Kim Ryholt concludes that the territory directly controlled by the 14th Dynasty roughly consisted of the Nile Delta, with borders located near Athribis in the western Delta and Bubastis in the east. Most modern Egyptologists share the view that Avaris – rather than Xois – was the 14th Dynasty's seat of power.

Contested rulers proposed by Ryholt as the first five rulers of the dynasty are commonly identified as being of Canaanite (Semitic) descent based on their names. His conclusions about their chronological position within the period are contested in Ben Tor's study. Other sources do not refer to the dynasty as foreign or Hyksos and they were not referred to as "rulers of foreign lands" or "shepherd kings" in kings lists. The most attested, non-contested ruler of the dynasty, Nehesy Aasehre, left his name on two monuments at Avaris. His name means "the Nubian". According to Ryholt, he was the son and direct successor of the pharaoh Sheshi with a Nubian Queen named Tati.

The contested rulers (with the translation of their nomens) are:

- Yakbim Sekhaenre ("Yakbim" means "(the goddess) Aya is a rock")
- Ya'ammu Nubwoserre ("Ya'ammu" means "where is the uncle")
- Qareh Khawoserre ("Qareh" means "the bald one")
- 'Ammu Aahotepre ("'Ammu" could mean "the Asiatic")
- Sheshi Maaibre ("Sheshi" is a Semitic name)

==== Fifteenth Dynasty ====
The kings of the Fifteenth Dynasty are said to have been either Canaanite or Amorite. 17th Dynasty Pharaoh Kamose is known to have referred to Apophis, one of the kings of the 15th dynasty, as ruler of Retjenu (Syria–Palestine). The kings formed "the second Asiatic Kingdom in the Delta" and ruled Lower Egypt from Avaris for a hundred years. In Manethonian tradition, Salitis, described as a Hyksos (ḥḳꜣw-ḫꜣswt, a "shepherd" according to Africanus), is believed to have conquered the entirety of Egypt, but it is more likely that his rule did not extend beyond Lower Egypt. It is believed that Avaris in the Delta was the largest city in the world from 1670 to 1557 BC under the Hyksos, but the kingdom being based in Avaris is now viewed as a secessionist move rather than expansionist. It is still debated if the movement of the Hyksos was a military invasion or a mass migration of Asiatics from Palestine, and the settling of Levantine populations in Egypt may have occurred peacefully in the wake of the disintegration of the 14th Dynasty.

The Turin King list indicates that there were six Hyksos kings, with an obscure Khamudi listed as the final king of the 15th Dynasty:

15th Dynasty Kings
Name	Image	Dates and comments
Salitis	Unattested	Mentioned by Manetho as first king of the dynasty; currently unidentified with any known archaeologically attested person. Ruled for 19 years according to Manetho, as quoted by Josephus.
Semqen		Mentioned on the Turin king list. According to Ryholt, he was an early Hyksos ruler, possibly the first king of the dynasty; von Beckerath assigns him to the 16th dynasty.
Aperanat		Mentioned on the Turin king list. According to Ryholt, he was an early Hyksos ruler, possibly the second king of the dynasty; von Beckerath assigns him to the 16th dynasty.
Khyan		Ruled 10+ years.
Yanassi		Khyan's eldest son, possibly at the origin of the mention of a king Iannas in Manetho's Aegyptiaca
Sakir-Har		Named as an Hyksos king on a doorjamb found at Avaris. Regnal order uncertain.
Apophis		c. 1590?–1550 BC Ruled 40+ years.
Khamudi		c. 1550–1540 BC

==== Abydos Dynasty ====
Stele of Wepwawetemsaf, a king attributed to the Abydos Dynasty

The Abydos Dynasty (c. 1640 to 1620 BC) may have been a short-lived local dynasty ruling over part of Upper Egypt during the Second Intermediate Period in Ancient Egypt and was contemporary with the 15th and 16th dynasties. The Abydos Dynasty stayed rather small with rulership over just Abydos or Thinis. The dynasty tentatively includes four rulers: Wepwawetemsaf, Pantjeny, Snaaib, and Senebkay. The Abydos Dynasty ceased when the Hyksos expanded into Upper Egypt.

A possible graffito of Wepwawetemsaf was discovered by Karl Richard Lepsius in the tomb BH2 of the 12th Dynasty nomarch Amenemhat at Beni Hasan, about 250 km North of Abydos, in Middle Egypt. If the attribution of this graffito is correct and if Wepwawetemsaf did belong to the Abydos Dynasty, then its territory might have extended that far north. Since the dynasty was contemporaneous with the 16th Dynasty, the territory under Abydene control could not have extended farther than Hu, 50 km south of Abydos.

==== Sixteenth Dynasty ====
The 16th Dynasty (c. 1650–1580 BC) ruled the Theban region in Upper Egypt. Of the two chief versions of Manetho's Aegyptiaca, the 16th Dynasty is described by the more reliable Africanus (supported by Syncellus) as "shepherd [Hyksos] kings", but by Eusebius as Theban. In his 1997 study of the SIP, the Danish Egyptologist Kim Ryholt argues that the 16th Dynasty was an independent Theban kingdom. From Ryholt's reconstruction of the Turin canon, 15 kings can be associated to the dynasty, several of whom are attested by contemporary sources. While most likely rulers based in Thebes itself, some may have been local rulers from other important Upper Egyptian towns, including Abydos, El Kab and Edfu. By the reign of Nebiriau I, the realm controlled by the 16th Dynasty extended at least as far north as Hu and south to Edfu.

Ryholt gives the list of kings of the 16th Dynasty as shown in the table below. Others, such as Helck, Vandersleyen, Bennett combine some of these rulers with the Seventeenth Dynasty of Egypt. The list of rulers is given here as per Kim Ryholt and is supposedly in chronological order:

16th Dynasty Kings
Name of king	Image	Dates	Comments
Unknown		1649–1648 BC	Name lost in a lacuna of the Turin canon
Sekhemre Sementawy Djehuty		1648–1645 BC	
Sekhemre-seusertawi Sobekhotep VIII		1645–1629 BC	
Sekhemre-seankhtawi Neferhotep III		1629–1628 BC	
Seankhenre Mentuhotepi		1628–1627 BC	
Sewadjenre Nebiryraw I		1627–1601 BC	
Nebiryraw II		1601 BC	
Semenre		1601–1600 BC	
Bebiankh		1600–1588 BC	
Sekhemre Shedwaset		1588 BC	
Unknown		1588–1582 BC	Five kings lost in a lacuna of the Turin canon

The continuing war against the 15th Dynasty dominated the short-lived 16th Dynasty. The armies of the 15th Dynasty continually encroached on 16th Dynasty territory, eventually conquering Thebes itself. Famine, which had plagued Upper Egypt during the late 13th Dynasty and the 14th Dynasty, also blighted the 16th Dynasty, most evidently during and after the reign of Neferhotep III. The 16th Dynasty dissolved around 1580 BC after conflict arose between Thebes and Avaris.

==== Seventeenth Dynasty ====
The 17th Dynasty (c.1571–1540 BC) was established by the Thebans quickly after the fall of the 16th. The borders between the Hyksos and the Egyptians seem to have alternated between Beni Hasan and Asyut. The founder of the dynasty was Rahotep and scholars consider his dynasty to have been native to Egypt. 17th Dynasty kings constructed a palatial complex at Deir el-Ballas, which is thought to have played an important role during the rule, but was later abandoned in the New Kingdom. Five kings are recorded on the Karnak King List, dated to the reign of Thutmose III. Three kings are also listed in the kings scene of TT2, dated to the reign of Ramesses II. More names may have originally appeared in the missing sections of the kings lists.

17th Dynasty Kings
Nomen (personal name)	Prenomen (throne name)	Horus-name	Image	Reign	Burial	Consort(s)	Comments
Rahotep	Sekhemre-wahkhaw	Wahankh		c. 1585 BC	Dra' Abu el-Naga'?		
Sobekemsaf I	Sekhemre-wadjkhaw	Hetepnetjeru		7 years	Dra' Abu el-Naga'?	Nubemhat	
Sobekemsaf II	Sekhemre-shedtawy	(unknown)	Statuette Sobekemsaf Petrie b		Dra' Abu el-Naga'? Tomb was robbed during the reign of Ramesses IX	Nubkhaes	
Intef V	Sekhemre-wepmaat	Wepmaat	Louvre 122006 050	2–3? years	Dra' Abu el-Naga'?		
Intef VI	Nubkheperre	Neferkheperu		3–8? years	Dra' Abu el-Naga'	Sobekemsaf	
Intef VII	Sekhemre-heruhermaat	(unknown)			Dra' Abu el-Naga'?	Haankhes	
Ahmose the Elder	Senakhtenre	Merymaat	Relief Senakhtenre by Khruner	1–2 years	Dra' Abu el-Naga'?	Tetisheri	
Tao	Seqenenre	Khaemwaset		c. 1560 (4 years)	Dra' Abu el-Naga'?	Ahmose Inhapy Sitdjehuti Ahhotep I	Died in battle against the Hyksos
Kamose	Wadjkheperre	Khahernesetef	Sarcophage-Kamose	1555 to 1550 BC (5 years)	Dra' Abu el-Naga'	Ahhotep II?	

The last two kings of the dynasty opposed the Hyksos rule over Egypt. The 17th Dynasty would see four different ruling families whose last king did not have a male heir to the throne. Subsequently, other powerful families established kings having short reigns. The 17th Dynasty maintained a short-lived peace with the 15th Dynasty, which ended with the start of the reign of Seqenenre, who started a series of wars against the Hyksos and perished in battle. King Kamose continued the war against the Hyksos as a whole, but his brother Ahmose I would be the king to deal the final blow.

=== Reunification ===
At the end of the Second Intermediate period, the 18th Dynasty came to power in Egypt. The first king of the 18th Dynasty, Ahmose, completed the expulsion of the Hyksos from Egypt and consolidated his rule over the land, unifying Upper and Lower Egypt. With that, Ahmose ushered in a new period of prosperity, the New Kingdom.

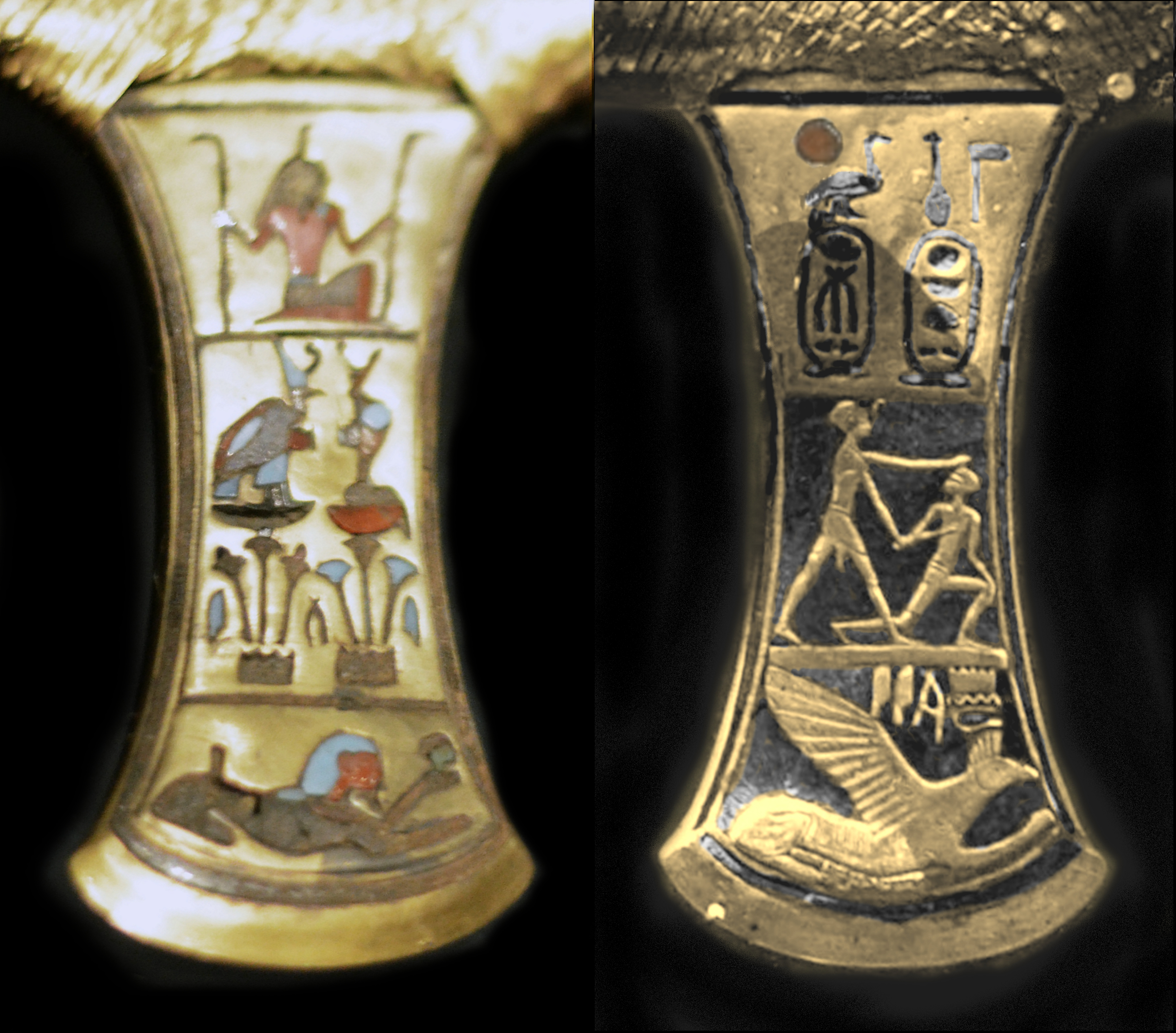
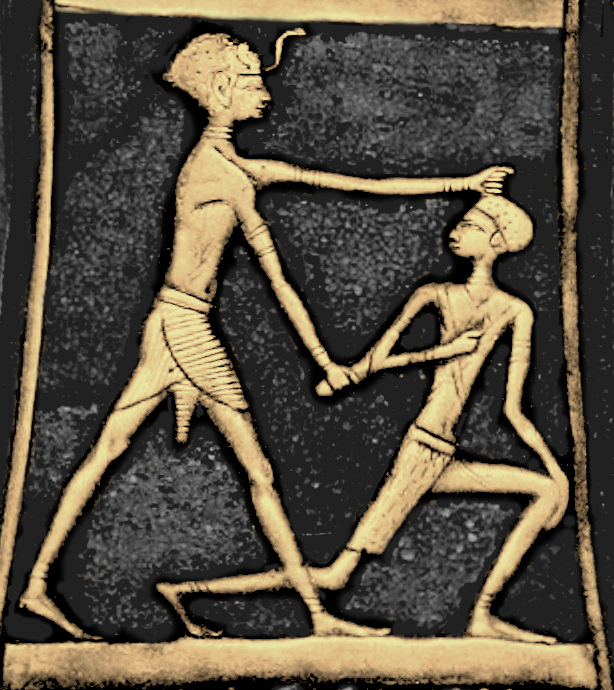
Pharaoh Ahmose I (ruled c. 1549–1524 BC) slaying a probable Hyksos. Detail of a ceremonial axe in the name of Ahmose I, treasure of Queen Ahhotep II. Inscription "Ahmose, beloved of (the War God) Montu". Luxor Museum

== Art and culture ==
=== Society ===
In the Late Middle Kingdom, Tell el-Dab'a became a major harbour for ships and a trading post with connections across the Mediterranean. It became increasingly populated by natives of the Levant, evidenced by changes in ceramics, burial customs, and architecture. Egyptian ethnonyms for Levantines include ꜥꜣmw ('Asiatics'), Jwntj.w ('those with bows'), k3tj.w ('those of the turquoise mining region on the Sinai'), Mnṯw.w ('furious ones(?)'), and Sṯtj.w ('those from the land of Setjet'), though this does not reflect their own identity. The exact origin of this Levantine population is debated; it is surmised they are a result of either seaborne immigration from the northern Levant or immigration from the southern Levant across the Sinai. Archaeological evidence from both regions suggests a rapid decline in trade contacts between Egypt and the northern Levant (Byblos), coinciding with the beginning of substantial trade contacts between Egypt and Palestine (southern Levant), sometime in the early 17th century BC. A number of seals found in Palestine attesting to Egyptian pharaohs are completely absent in the northern Levant. Support for the southern Levant shift is evidenced by 2020 analysis on Canaanite pottery from Tell el-Dab'a.

=== Warfare ===
A number of advances were introduced into Egypt during the period and thus adapted into the culture of the early New Kingdom, notably the use of horse and chariot and the wielding of the composite bow and the khopesh (sickle sword) in combat. Avaris being credited for the introduction of the horse and chariot is contested, as it is possible it was introduced by the Libyans instead. A team of archaeologists in 2011 uncovered pits containing severed right hands dating back roughly 3,600 years directly in front of the throne room of a Hyksos palace. This practice of taking enemies hands as trophies was named the "gold of honor" ritual and was probably introduced by the Hyksos. Later in Egypt, the ritual appears to have become standard practice.

=== Art ===
The arts of the first half of the 13th Dynasty is part of the Middle Kingdom (about 2025–1700 BC). The culture of the latter half of the 13th Dynasty in Upper Egypt exhibits a sharp downward trend, with loss of standard and style notably in orthography when inscribing hieroglyphs. Royal monuments no longer attain a certain level of artistry after the mid-13th Dynasty. Whilst the monuments commissioned by the king remain a relatively high level, the arts of the Second Intermediate Period generally do not reach this level in non-commissioned work again until the New Kingdom. 15th Dynasty rulers reverted to a style of scarab craftmanship common in the 12th Dynasty, though it soon corrupted after this initial ideal with scarabs becoming more degraded and perfunctory than the preceding 14th Dynasty. Archaeological evidence in Egypt indicates large-scale importation of Canaanite scarabs during the Second Intermediate Period. The proliferation of Anra scarabs in Egypt and Nubia was bolstered by the Palestinian market in the Levant, with anra scarabs most frequently found in Palestine (over 80%).

Art of the Second Intermediate Period (1782 to 1550 BC)

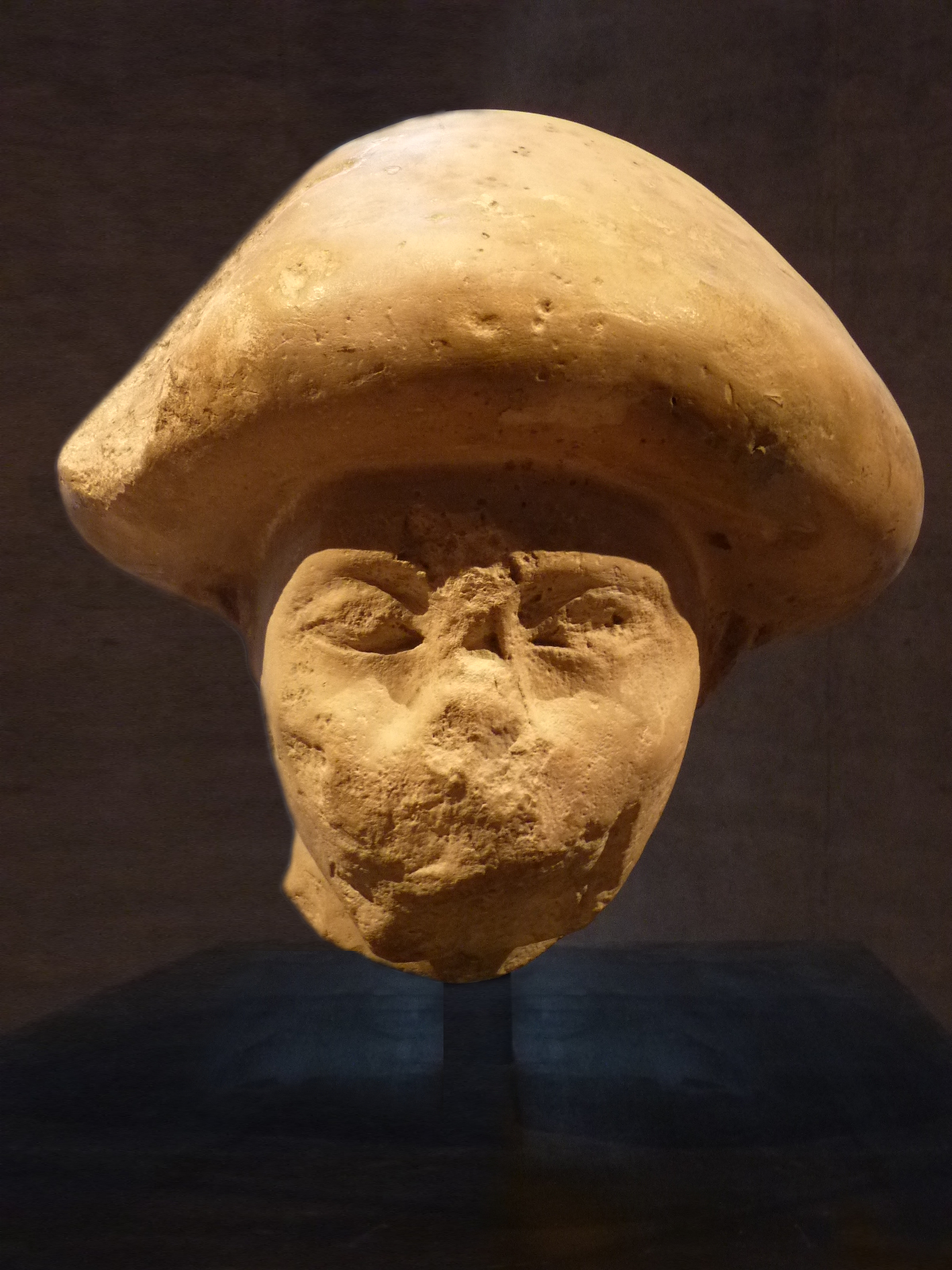
Asiatic (Hyksos) official, with the distinctive "mushroom headed" hairstyle

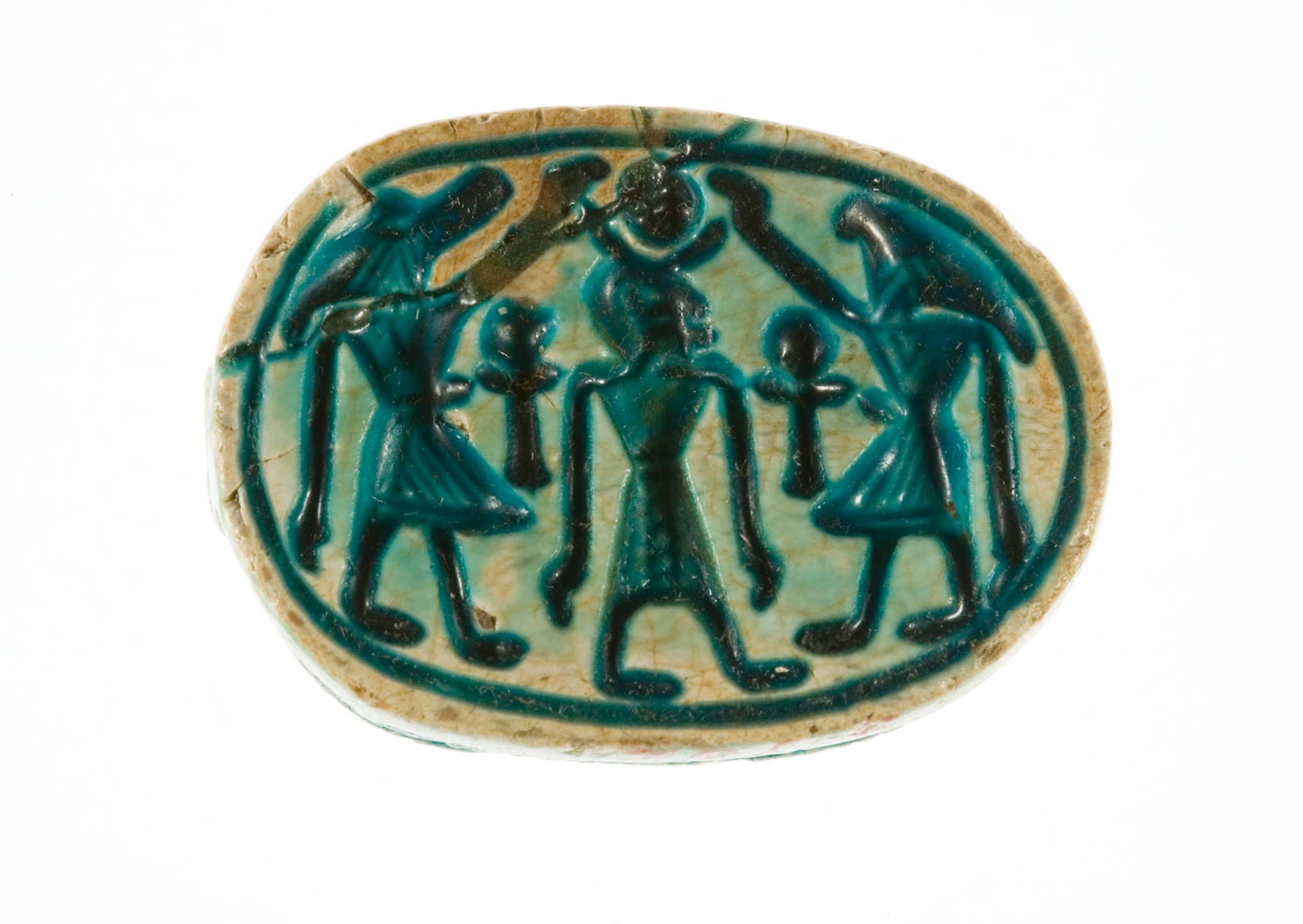
Late 15th Dynasty glazed steatite scarab with a solar/lunar deity (?) protected by two animal headed figures

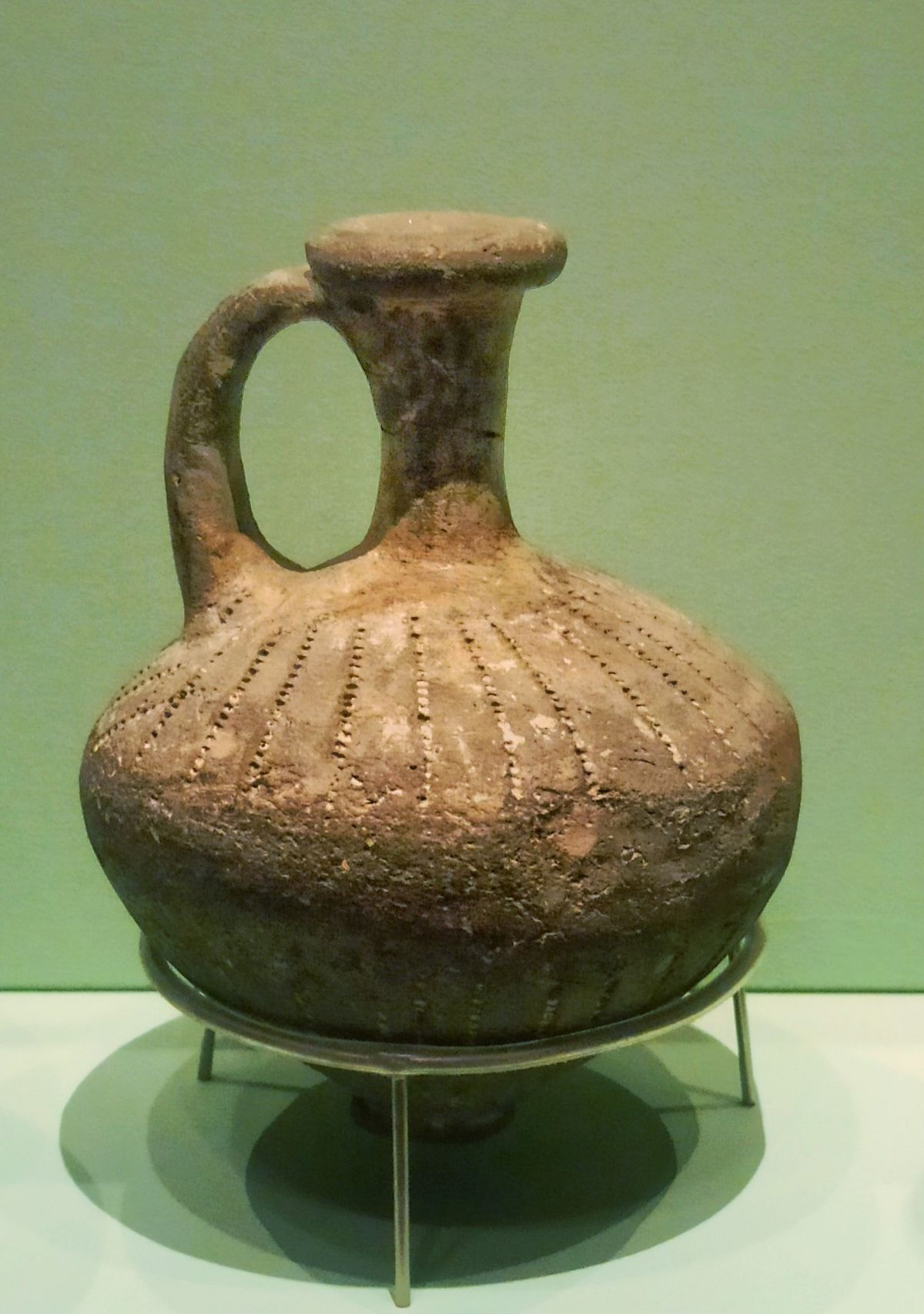
Small jar with handle

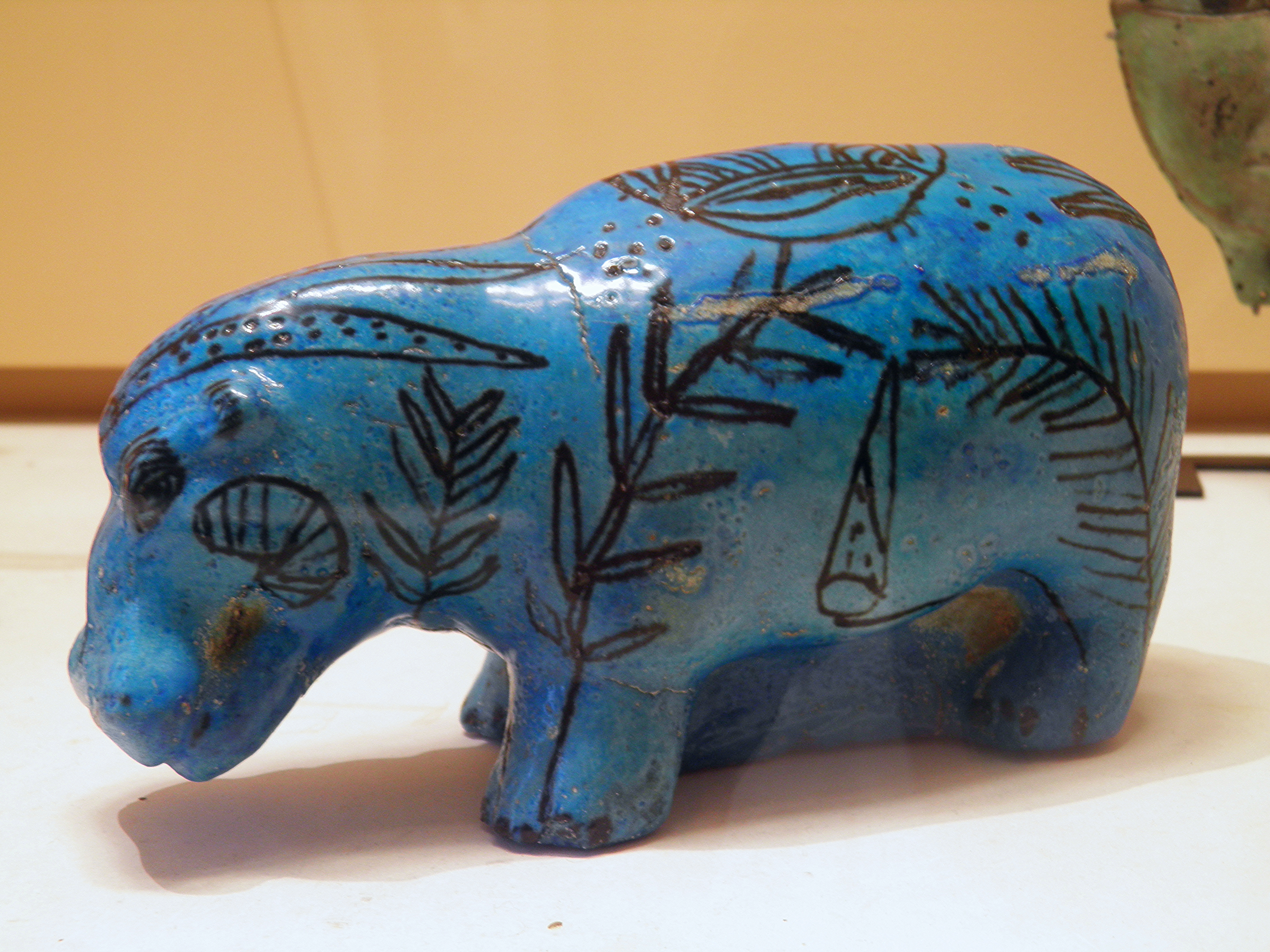
Blue glazed faience Hippopotamus figurine, excavated in Thebes, Egypt

=== Religion ===
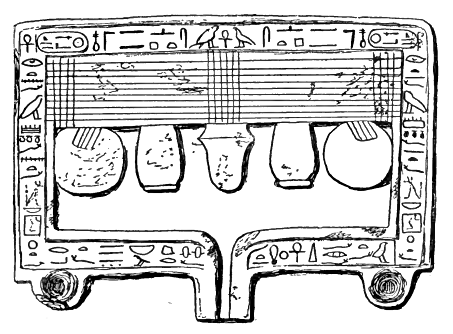
An offering table dedicated to the deity Set by Apepi of the 15th Dynasty

The Hyksos Rulers (c. 1550 BC), of foreign origin, adopted Egyptian conventions including the assumption of royal titles and prenomens according to custom, hieroglyphic inscriptions, and worship of the Egyptian pantheon. They took Set as their patron deity and it later merged with Ba'al of the Asiatic pantheon, becoming the hybrid deity Seth-Baal over time. By 200 BC, a tradition developed in the Ptolemaic Kingdom that identified Yahweh with Set. King Apophis is recorded as worshiping Set exclusively, as described in this 19th Dynasty passage:

King Apophis chose for his Lord the god Seth. He did not worship any other deity in the whole land except Seth.

— "The Quarrel of Apophis and Seqenenre", Papyrus Sallier I, 1.2–3 (British Museum No. 10185)

== Genetic impact ==
Genetic data from mummies of the Third Intermediate Period (787–544 BC), published in 2017 and again analysed in 2025, showed marginal continuity from the Nuwayrat Old Kingdom individual (NUE001) sample, complemented by a significant Levantine ancestry influx. The main ancestry source of the Third Intermediate Period mummies was Bronze Age Levant ancestry, appearing at around 64% in the main model. This phenomenon could have originated in the proposed Bronze Age Canaanite expansion of the end of the Middle Kingdom and the advent of the Second Intermediate Period of Egypt.

A strontium isotope analysis dismissed the Hyksos invasion model in favour of a migration one. Contrary to the model of a foreign invasion, the study did not find more males moving into the region, but instead found a sex bias towards females, with a high proportion (77%) being non-locals.

== See also ==
- First Intermediate Period of Egypt
- Third Intermediate Period of Egypt

== Bibliography ==
- Baker, Rosalie F.; Baker, Charles F. (2001). Ancient Egyptians: People of the Pyramids. USA: Oxford University Press. ISBN 978-0-19-512221-3.
- Daressy, Georges (1906). "Un poignard du temps des Rois Pasteurs". Annales du Service des Antiquités de l'Égypte. 7: 115–120.
- Montet, Pierre (1968). Lives of the pharaohs. Weidenfeld and Nicolson. ISBN 978-0-600-35452-9.
- Morgan, Lyvia (2010). "An Aegean Griffin in Egypt: The Hunt Frieze at Tell el-Dab´a". Ägypten und Levante / Egypt and the Levant. 20: 303–323. doi:10.1553/AEundL20s303. JSTOR 23789943.
- Von Beckerath, Jürgen. "Untersuchungen zur politischen Geschichte der zweiten Zwischenzeit in Ägypten", Ägyptologische Forschungen, Heft 23. Glückstadt, 1965.
- Gardiner, Sir Alan. Egypt of the Pharaohs. Oxford, 1964, 1961.
- Hayes, William C. "Egypt: From the Death of Ammenemes III to Seqenenre II". Chapter 2, Volume II of The Cambridge Ancient History. Revised Edition, 1965.
- James, T.G.H. "Egypt: From the Expulsion of the Hyksos to Amenophis I". Chapter 8, Volume II of The Cambridge Ancient History. Revised Edition, 1965.
- Kitchen, Kenneth A., "Further Notes on New Kingdom Chronology and History", Chronique d'Égypte, 63 (1968), pp. 313–324.
- Morez Jacobs, Adeline; Irish, Joel D.; Cooke, Ashley; Anastasiadou, Kyriaki; Barrington, Christopher; Gilardet, Alexandre; Kelly, Monica; Silva, Marina; Speidel, Leo; Tait, Frankie; Williams, Mia; Brucato, Nicolas; Ricaut, Francois-Xavier; Wilkinson, Caroline; Madgwick, Richard; Holt, Emily; Nederbragt, Alexandra J.; Inglis, Edward; Hajdinjak, Mateja; Skoglund, Pontus; Girdland-Flink, Linus (2 July 2025). "Whole-genome ancestry of an Old Kingdom Egyptian". Nature: 1–8. doi:10.1038/s41586-025-09195-5. ISSN 1476-4687. PMC 12367555. PMID 40604286.
- Oren, Eliezer D. The Hyksos: New Historical and Archaeological Perspectives Philadelphia, 1997.
- Ryholt, Kim. The Political Situation in Egypt during the Second Intermediate Period c. 1800–1550 B.C., Museum Tuscalanum Press, 1997. ISBN 87-7289-421-0
- Van Seters, John. The Hyksos: A New Investigation. New Haven, 1966.

Preceded by Middle Kingdom	Time Periods of Egypt; 1650–1550 BC	Succeeded by New Kingdom
