= Merhotepre Ini =

Egyptian pharaoh of Dynasty XIII

- Ana, Ani, Inai, In(j)
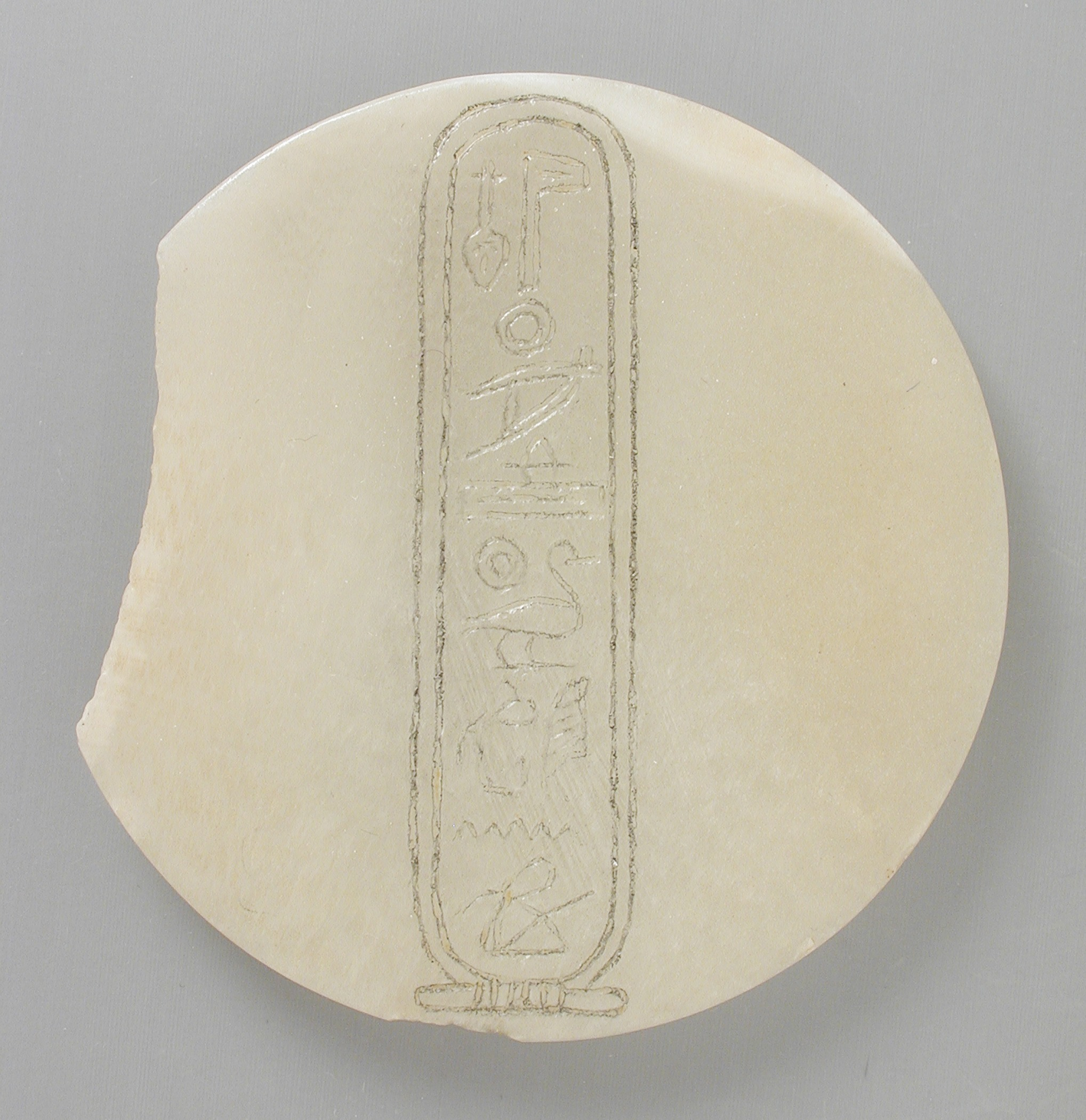
- Jar lid of Merhotepre Ini, at the LACMA

Pharaoh
- Reign: 2 Years, 3-4 Months and 9 days 1677 BC – 1675 BC
- Predecessor: Merneferre Ay
- Successor: Sankhenre Sewadjtu
Royal titulary
Prenomen
Merhotepre
Mr-ḥtp-Rˁ
Beloved satisfaction of Ra
M23 t L2 t < ra U7 Htp t p >
Nomen
Ini
Jnj

| G39 N5 | i A2 n A1 |
- Father: possibly Merneferre Ay
- Mother: possibly queen Ini
- Dynasty: 13th dynasty

Merhotepre Ini was a minor king in Ancient Egypt, thought to be the successor of Merneferre Ay in the late Thirteenth Dynasty of Egypt. The Turin King List assigns him a brief reign of 2 Years, 3 or 4 Months and 9 days.

== Attestations ==
Attestations are few and must be separated into "Merhotepre", "Merhotepre Ini" and "Merhotepre Sobekhotep". Franke and von Beckerath identified Merhotepre Sobekhotep with Merhotepre Ini, on the basis that they have the same prenomen. Ryholt (1997) argued they were two separate rulers as Merhotepre Sobekhotep was listed in a lacuna below Sobekhotep IV. Merneferre Ay, the predecessor of Merhotepre Ini, seem to be more related to the Memphis-Faiyum region, while Merhotepre Sobekhotep is more active in the Thebaid region.

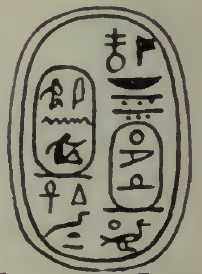
Drawing by F. Petrie of a scarab seal of Merhotepre Ini, now in the Petrie Museum.

=== "Ini" ===
Two attestations of "Ini" are known.

1. Of Unknown Provenance, a scarab seal contained two cartouches, one with Merhotepre and the other with Ini.
2. Of Unknown Provenance, a jar-lid contains one cartouche with the double-name Merhotepre Ini.

=== "Merhotepre" ===
1. In the Medinet el-Fayum, a scarab seal with the prenomen "Merhotepre" was found.^{<add ref>}
2. At Abydos, a limestone stela depicting a king "Merhotepre" (right) worshipping the god Anubis. The spelling in the cartouche of "Merhotepre" is slightly different from those of "Merhotepre Ini", and may refer to "Merhotepre Sobekhotep".

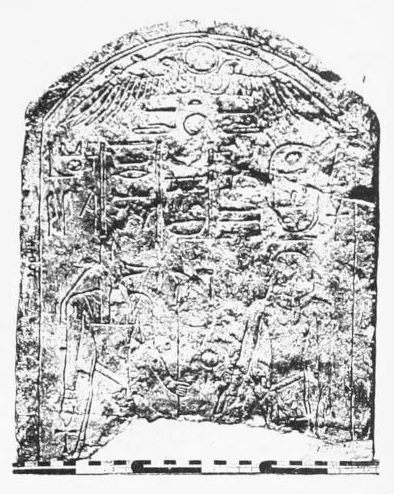
Stela of Merhotepre, CG 20044

=== Non-contemporary attestations ===
The Karnak King List 50 (52) dating to the time of Thutmose III, mentions "Merhotepre" between Sewahenra (49) and Wegaf (51).

The Turin King List 8:04 dating to the time of Ramesses II, mentions "The Dual King Merhotepra, 2 years, 2-4 months, 9 days". In this king list he was preceded by Merneferre Ay (8:03) and succeeded by Sankhenra Sewadjtu (8:05).

=== Cairo Juridical Stele ===
The Juridical Stela mentions a king "Merhotepre". It has historically been linked to Merhotepre Ini, but may also refer to Merhotepre Sobekhotep. The Theban document is dated to Year 1 king Nebiryraw I, contains a genealogical charter which states that Ayameru—the son by Vizier Aya and the King's daughter Reditenes—was appointed Governor of El-Kab in Year 1 of Merhotepre. The reason for this appointment was due to the unexpected death of the childless Governor of El-Kab Aya-junior who was Vizier Aya's eldest son and Ayameru's elder brother. The charter identifies a certain Kebsi as the son of Governor, and later, Vizier Ayameru. The Cairo Juridical Stela records the sale of the office of the governorship of El-Kab to a certain Sobeknakht. This Sobeknakht I was the father of the illustrious governor Sobeknakht II who built one of the most richly decorated tombs at El-Kab during the Second Intermediate Period.

== Theories ==
The exact chronological position of Merhotepre Ini in the 13th Dynasty is not known for certain owing to uncertainties affecting earlier kings of the dynasty. He is ranked as the thirty-third king of the dynasty by Darrell Baker, as the thirty-fourth king by Kim Ryholt and in position 28a in studies by Jürgen von Beckerath, a result which Baker qualifies as "nebulous".

Based on the Juridical Stele, Kim Ryholt proposes that Merhotepre Ini was the son of his predecessor Merneferre Ay with his senior queen Ini and with Reditenes as a sister of Merhotepre Ini. The vizierate was an hereditary position at the time and a change of family in charge of the position would have been an important political move. In particular, Reditenes being possibly a sister of Merhotepre Ini, his appointing Aya (thus his brother-in-law) to the vizierate would bring the position into his own family.

For "Ini" see also Mershepsesre Ini.

| Preceded by Merneferre Ay | Pharaoh of Egypt; Thirteenth Dynasty | Succeeded by Sankhenre Sewadjtu |
