= Sobeknakht (disambiguation) =

Sobeknakht was high steward during the 12th Dynasty in ancient Egypt.

Sobeknakht (Sbk-nḫt, "Sobek is strong") may also refer to:

- Sobeknakht I, official and nomarch during the Second Intermediate Period, father of the one below
- Sobeknakht II, official and nomarch during the Second Intermediate Period, son of Sobeknakht I
- Sobeknakht (king's daughter), princess during the late 12th or early 13th Dynasty
