= Sobeknakht II =

Ancient Egyptian nomarch

- Nomarch of the 3rd nome of Upper Egypt
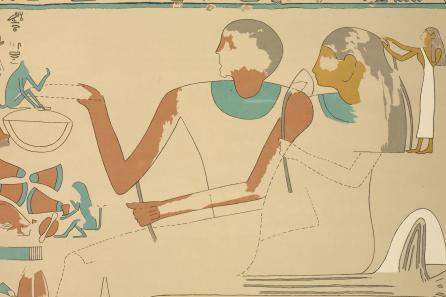
- Sobeknakht II and his wife on a painting from his tomb. Drawing by J.J. Tylor
- Predecessor: Sobeknakht I
- Dynasty: 16th or 17th Dynasty
- Burial: El-Kab, tomb T10
- Spouse: Reditenes (Member of the Elite), Ta-inty (King's Ornament)
- Father: Sobeknakht I
- Mother: Neferu (Member of the Elite)
- Children: (m) Sobeknakht III, (f) Ta-henuty, (f) Sobeknakht, (m) Sobeknakht

Sobeknakht II was an ancient Egyptian Nomarch at El-Kab and a supporter of the Theban 16th or 17th Dynasty during the Second Intermediate Period.

== Biography ==
Not much is known about Sobeknakht's life. He was the son of Sobeknakht I as well as his successor as Nomarch of Nekhen. His father obtained this office from a relative called Kebsi, who sold it in order to settle a debt of 60 deben of gold. The transaction is documented by the Juridical Stela, which was issued in Year 1 of the Theban pharaoh Nebiryraw I.

== Burial ==
At Elkab, the Tomb of Sobeknakht II is known as Tomb 66 (10). It is one of the best preserved and most richly decorated tombs of the Egyptian Second Intermediate Period. It is hewn out of the sandstone rock cliffs and consists of two rectangular chambers connected by a central doorway. The burial shaft is sunk into the floor of the innermost chamber, the walls of which are left blank unlike the outer chamber. Decorations include Sobeknakht with his wife and children and a number of monkeys in various poses and activities, such as eating food from the deceased's offering table.

=== Archeological history ===
The tomb was discovered in the 19th century; however, it was neglected. In 2003, in response to concerns about its deterioration, his tomb was cleaned by British Egyptologists and was found to contain a 22-line inscription with important historical significance. The inscription was made with red paint on the doorway between the two internal chambers.

It records a massive Nubian invasion, aided by peoples from the land of Punt and the Medjay, on the small and fragile 16th or 17th Dynasty city state of Thebes. Sobeknakht II claims to have strengthened El-Kab's defenses, mustered a fighting force, and launched a counter-attack, which was victorious due to the aid of the vulture-goddess Nekhbet A celebration is attended by an unnamed Egyptian king, and Sobeknakht endows the temple of Nekhbet with "a new sacred barque worked in electrum."

A vessel with Sobeknakht's name was discovered in Sudan, which seems to corroborate the events depicted. It also hints that Sobeknakht's tomb had already been filled and finished by the time of the invasion, and that the red text was added as a late addition to reflect these new events in his life, the corridor being the only remaining space left to complete such a task.

== Datation ==
In addition to reporting the trade of the governorship of Nekhen from Kebsi to Sobeknakht I (father of Sobeknakht II), the aforementioned Cairo Juridical stela contains an important genealogical charter which states that Kebsi inherited the title of Nomarch from his father Ayameru when the latter in turn inherited the vizierate from his father Aya. Now, Ayameru was appointed Nomarch of Nekhen in Year 1 of the 13th Dynasty of a king with the prenomen Merhotepre. Two kings are known with this prenomen, Merhotepre Sobekhotep and Merhotepre Ini. Scholars have often associated Merhotepre with Merhotepre Ini. This means that a period of only two family generations, or about 40–60 years at most, separate Year 1 of the 13th Dynasty king Merhotepre Ini from Year 1 of the 16th-dynasty king Nebiryraw I, the latter of whom is assigned a reign of 26 years in the Turin Canon.
