= Hormeni =

- Prince of Nekhen
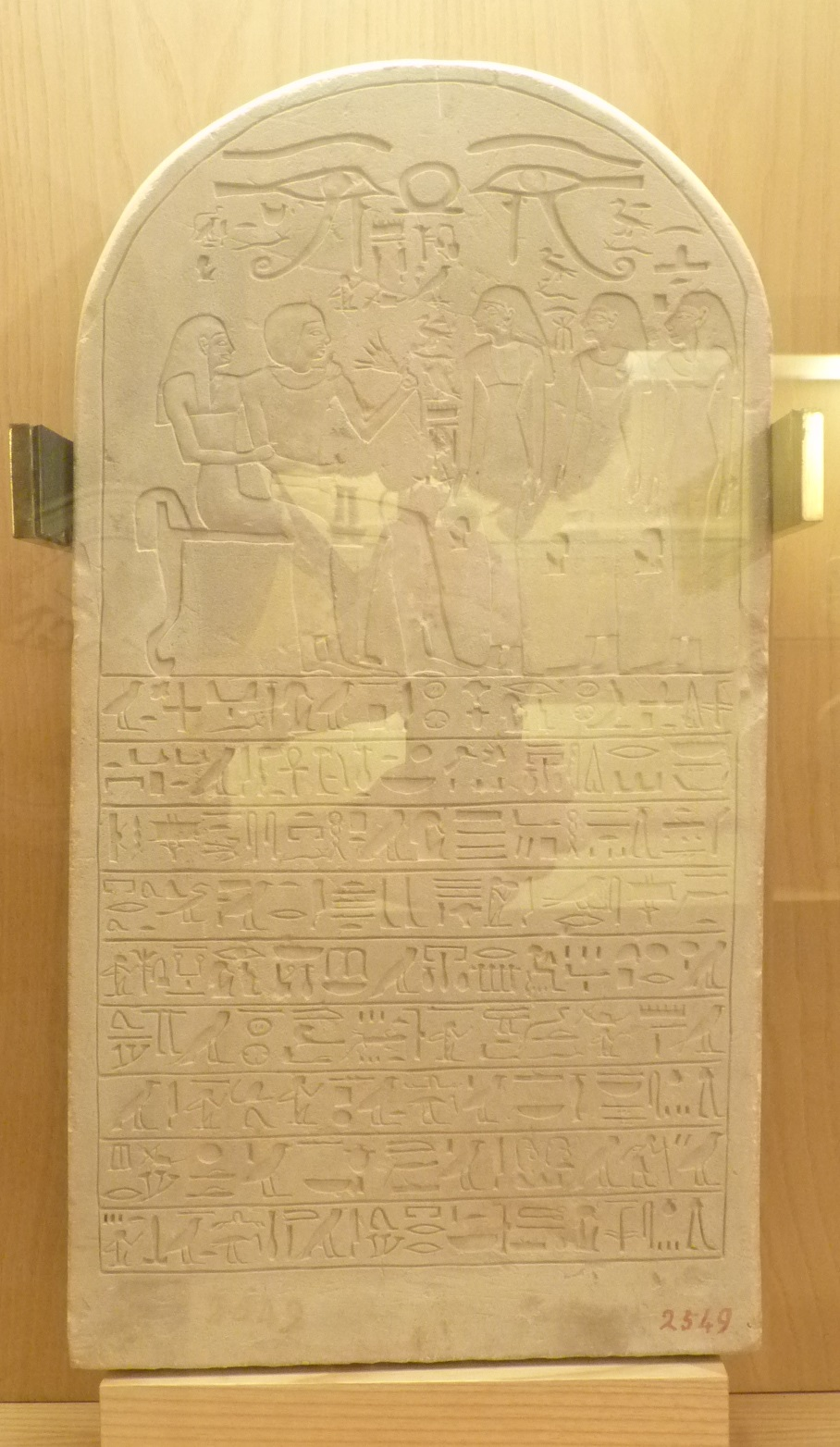
- Funerary stela of Hormeni (Florence 2549)
Egyptian name
G5 mn n P11 P1 A1Ḥr-mnj
- Dynasty: Eighteenth Dynasty
- Burial: possibly Burg el Hamman, Nekhen
- Spouse: Djiat
- Children: Hormeni, Ahmose, Ahhotep

Hormeni (also Harmone) was an ancient Egyptian dignitary who officiated at the beginning of the Eighteenth Dynasty.

== Biography ==
Details about Hormeni's life are known thanks to his funerary stela that probably came from El Kab. It was found by Ippolito Rosellini in approximately 1829 and currently, it is exhibited at the National Archaeological Museum in Florence (inv. no. 2549). On it, Hormeni is depicted along with his wife Dijat and their three daughters Hormeni, Ahmose, and Ahhotep.

A scribe since his early career, Hormeni also managed to become haty-a ("prince" or "mayor") of Nekhen, the capital of the third Upper Egyptian nome. He also had authority in Wawat (Lower Nubia) and he spent many years there, being in charge of collecting annual tributes for the pharaoh. After him, this task was assigned to the newly created office of Viceroy of Kush, a position first occupied by Ahmose called Si-Tayit.

== Possible tomb ==
Hormeni's tomb may be a rock-cut tomb in Nekhen that is located on the upper terrace of the Burg el Hamman. The tomb has not been published officially, but is mentioned in a field report. The tomb's decorations are difficult to see, but not impossible. The tomb owner, Hormini, is shown before Horus of Nekhen, who is depicted as a falcon-headed man. Isis, sometimes described as the mother of Horus, is present in the scene as well and she is depicted crowned with a scorpion. It might be the earliest representation of Hedetet.Hathor also was described as his mother, especially in earlier texts. During changes within the culture over the centuries, many of these associations blended or changed.

The texts also mention Thutmose I, possibly providing another link to associate the artifact with the eighteenth dynasty official. Tentatively, the owner of this tomb has been identified with the owner of the stela in Florence.
