= Juridical Stela =

Ancient Egyptian stele

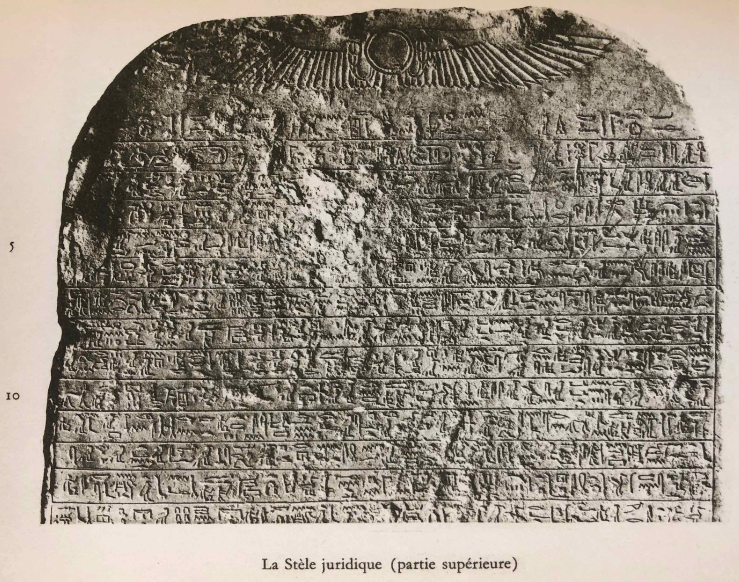
- Material: Limestone
- Length: 72 cm
- Height: 1.18 meters
- Created: c. 1650 BC
- Discovered: 1927; Luxor, Egypt
- Present location: Egyptian Museum, Cairo, Egypt
- Identification: JE 52453
- Language: Egyptian

The Juridical Stela or Cairo Juridical Stela (French: Stèle Juridique; Cairo JE 52453) is an ancient Egyptian stele issued around 1650 BC. Kept at the Cairo Museum, its main purpose is to document the sale of a government office.

== History ==
The Juridical Stela was found in 1927 during some consolidation works in the Great Hypostyle Hall at Karnak (in modern Luxor), where it was placed during the New Kingdom. The stele is actually older than the Hypostyle Hall, being issued during the Second Intermediate Period, and it is dated to the regnal Year 1 of the Theban King Nebiryraw I of the 16th or 17th Dynasty. The stele is made from limestone, and measures 1.18 m (46 in) in height and 72 cm (28 in) in width. It is carved with 28 lines of Egyptian hieroglyph text, and it is now housed at the Cairo Museum.

== Content ==
The text on the stele reports the sale of the office of governor of El-Kab from a man called Kebsi to a relative called Sobeknakht I. It seems that Kebsi contracted a significant debt of 60 gold deben towards Sobeknakht; not having the possibility to pay, Kebsi decided to sell his office to Sobeknakht who would become the new governor of El-Kab, with all the benefits that this charge entailed. All the documents necessary for the transaction were brought to the Vizier who checked Kebsi's genealogy in order to confirm that he was indeed the heir of the office.

The genealogy and all the passages of the government office can be summarized as follows:

- The earliest person mentioned is Vizier Aya and his wife, the King's daughter Reditenes. The couple had two sons, Aya “the younger” and Ayameru.
- Aya “the younger” held the government office until his unexpected death, when the office passed to his younger brother Ayameru.
- Later, Ayameru inherited the vizierate from his father. This happened in the regnal Year 1 of a king Merhotepre (cf. Merhotepre Sobekhotep or Merhotepre Ini of the 13th Dynasty).
- The now-Vizier Ayameru left the government office to his son Kebsi.
- Kebsi sold the office to Sobeknakht. This happened in the regnal Year 1 of king Nebiryraw I (i.e. the date on which the stela was issued).

The Vizier confirmed that Kebsi was heir of the office of governor of El-Kab. The whole process was sealed in the Vizier's quarters with the participation of witnesses, whereupon Sobeknakht received the rights to the office. On a separate note, this Sobeknakht was no other than the father of the more famous governor of El-Kab, Sobeknakht II.

== Importance ==
The monument is considered one of the most important of its kind, because it provides valuable juridical information about the provincial administration in Ancient Egypt, and about both the inheritance of an office and the possibility of trading it. The Juridical Stela is also an important temporal link within a quite obscure period of Egyptian history – the Second Intermediate Period – between the 13th Dynasty king Merhotepre and the later Theban king Nebiryraw I.
