= Khahotepre Sobekhotep VI =

Egyptian pharaoh

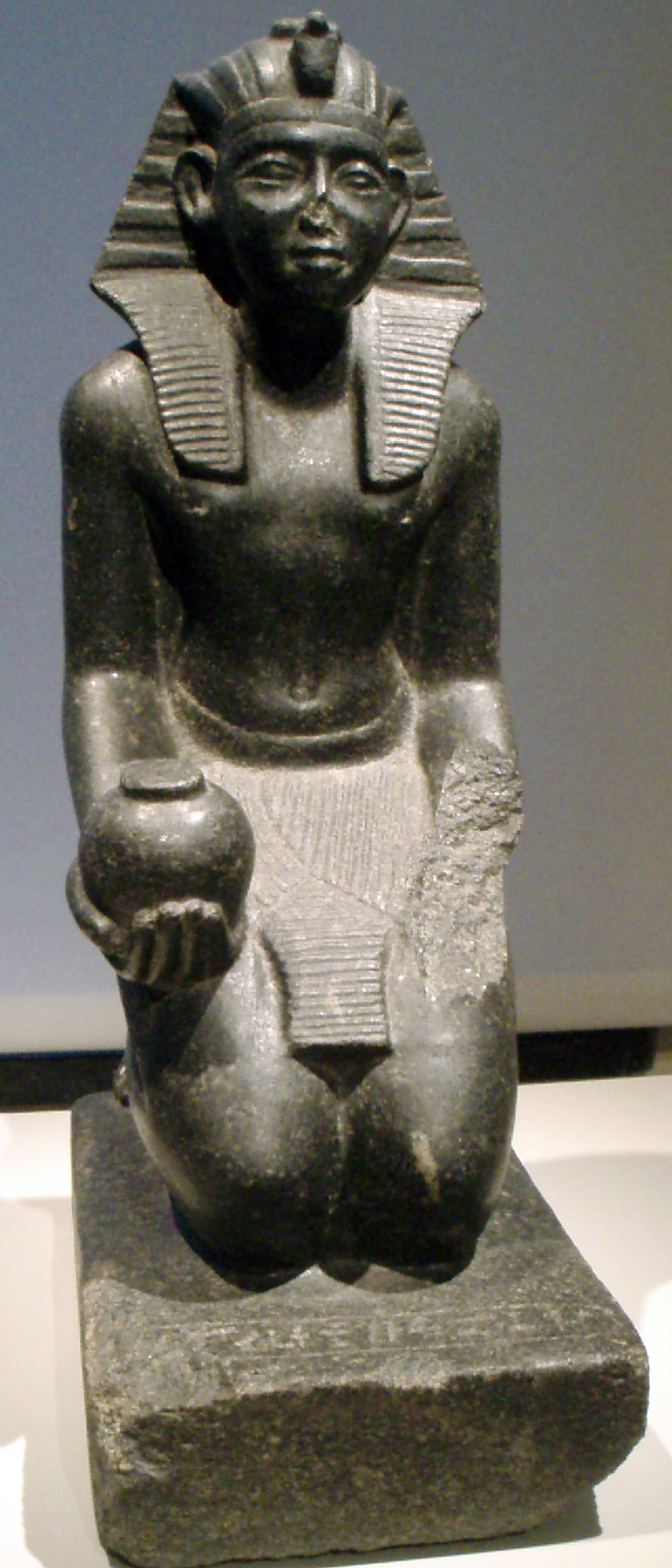
- Kneeling statue of Khahotepre Sobekhotep VI, on display at the Altes Museum, Berlin

Pharaoh
- Reign: 4 years, 8 months and 29 days, 1719-1715 BC
- Predecessor: Sobekhotep V
- Successor: Wahibre Ibiau
Royal titulary
Prenomen
Khahotepre
Ḫˁ-ḥtp-Rˁ
The satisfaction of Ra appears
M23 t L2 t < ra xa Htp >
Karnak king list
Khahotepre
Ḫˁ-ḥtp-Rˁ
The satisfaction of Ra appears
< ra xa Htp t p >
Turin King List
Khahotep Rahotep
Ḫˁ-ḥtp-Rˁ-ḥtp
The satisfaction of Ra appears
< ra xa a Y1 Htp t p > G7
Nomen
Sobekhotep
Sbk ḥtp
Sobek is satisfied
G39 N5 < sbk Htp t p >
- Consort: Nubhotepti ? Khaenoub ?
- Father: Sobekhotep IV ?
- Mother: Tjan ?
- Dynasty: 13th Dynasty

Khahotepre Sobekhotep VI (also known as Sobekhotep V) was an Egyptian king of the late 13th Dynasty during the Second Intermediate Period.

== Family ==
Khahotepre Sobekhotep VI's father was perhaps Sobekhotep IV, the best attested king of the entire second intermediate period. This hypothesis is based on an inscription found in the Wadi el-Hudi which attests that Sobekhotep IV had a son called 'Sobekhotep'. If this son is indeed Sobekhotep VI, then his mother would be possibly Tjan, wife of Sobekhotep IV. Sobekhotep VI's queen may have been named Khaenoub (also Khaesnebou) or Nubhotepti.

== Attestations ==
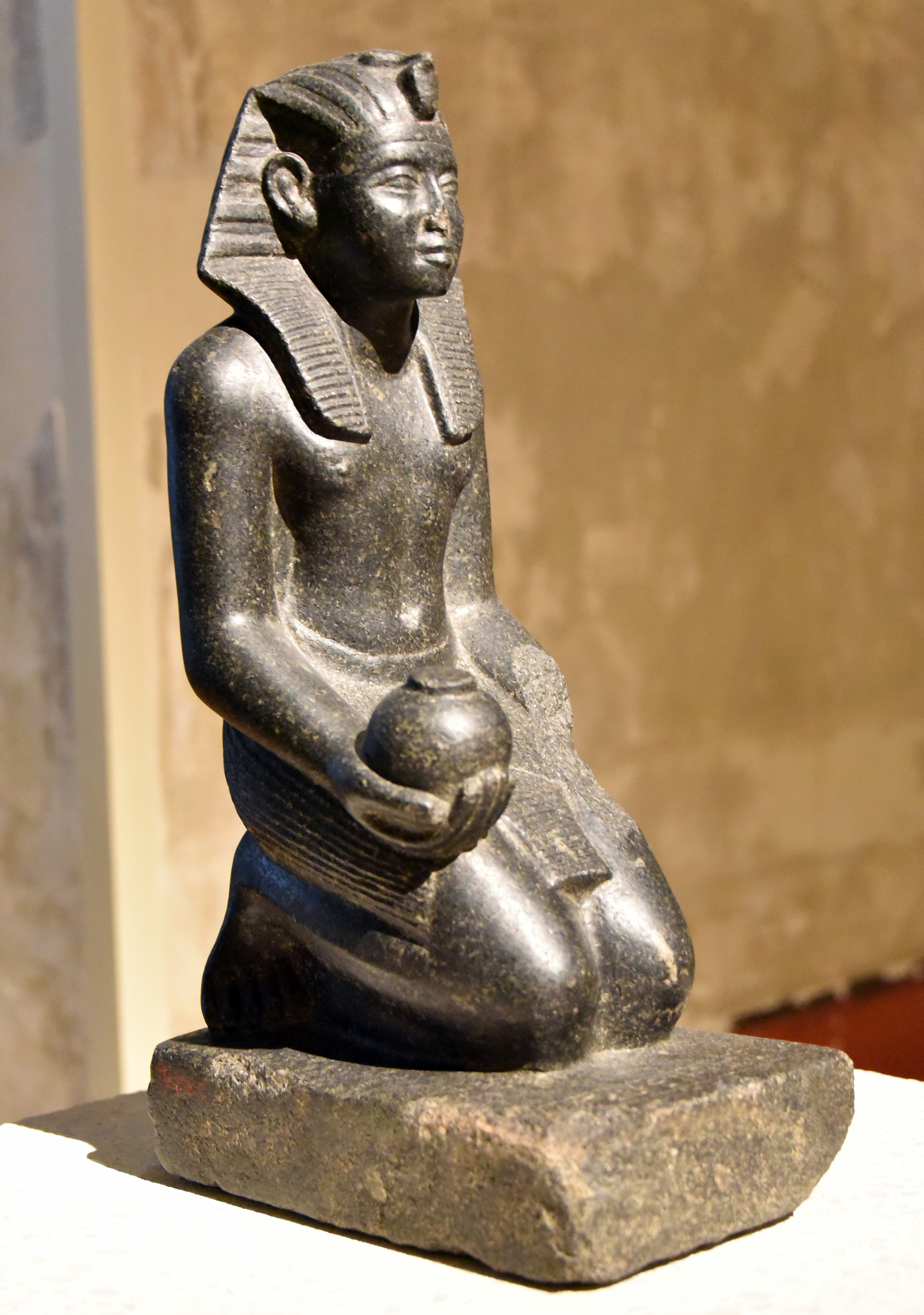
Kneeling figure of Sobekhotep V, from Egypt, 1750–1700 BCE. Neues Museum, Berlin

Khahotepre Sobekhotep may have had four regnal years. Only a few objects attest to his reign. There exists a scarab seal from Abydos and a kneeling statuette of the king, possibly from Kerma.

At Abydos, a fragmentary funerary stela dedicated to the god Wepwawet mentions [Kha]hotepre. The stela has also been assigned to Merhotepre Ini.

At Elephantine, a kneeling statue with a dedication to Satis, Lady of Elephantine, found at Kerma Tumulus X.

In Jericho, a scarab bearing the prenomen Khahotepre was found in a tomb associated with pottery Group III (MB IIB/C). It could be evidence of trade relations between the 13th dynasty state and the Levant.

Items of unknown provenance include 6 scarab seals, a cylinder seal and a seal impression.

=== Non-Contemporary Attestations ===
The Karnak King List #41 dating to Thutmoses III mentions his prenomen Khahotepre.

The Turin canon 8:01 dating to Ramesses II mentions Khahotepre, credited with a reign of 4 years, 8 months and 29 days, He is considered a successor of Sobekhotep IV. However, one line is missing (lacuna) just below the line of Sobekhotep IV. Ryholt speculates that this line would preserve the name of Merhotepre Sobekhotep.

== Theories ==
According to Egyptologist Kim Ryholt he was the thirty-first pharaoh of the dynasty, while Darrell Baker believes instead that he was its thirtieth ruler. Alternatively, Jürgen von Beckerath and Detlef Franke see him as the twenty-fifth king of the dynasty.

Ryholt dates Sobekhotep VI to 1719-1715 BC.

=== Identity ===
Until Ryholt's study of the Second Intermediate Period, it was believed that Sobekhotep VI's prenomen was Merhotepre. Reevaluating the archeological evidence, however, Ryholt attributed Merhotepre to Sobekhotep V and Khahotepre to Sobekhotep VI. Because of this change of prenomen, Merhotepre Sobekhotep and Khahotepre Sobekhotep are respectively called Sobekhotep VI and Sobekhotep V in older studies.

Preceded by Merhotepre Sobekhotep	Pharaoh of Egypt; Thirteenth Dynasty	Succeeded by Wahibre Ibiau
