= Sobeknakht I =

Ancient Egyptian official of the Second Intermediate Period

- Nomarch of the 3rd nome of Upper Egypt
- Predecessor: Kebsi
- Dynasty: 16th or 17th Dynasty
- Burial: Elkab
- Spouse: Nofru
- Children: Sobeknakht II

Sobeknakht I was an ancient Egyptian official of the Second Intermediate Period. He was the local Nomarch at Elkab.

== Biography ==
Sobeknakht I started his career as a King's Son and Overseer of the gs-pr. Later, he became Nomarch of Nekhen.

The overseer of the gs-pr was a royal estate manager in provinces often associated with the overseer of the sealed things (treasury), and was also connected to future Nomarchs.

== Attestation ==
Sobeknakht I is mainly known from two sources; the Juridical Stela and tomb inscriptions.

=== Nomarch of Nekhen ===
When Nebiriau became king, the Governorship of Nekhen was transferred from Kebsi to his brother Sobeknakht I.

==== Juridical Stela, Cairo JE 52453 ====
The Juridical Stela documents the transfer of the Governorship of Nekhen from a certain Kebsi to a relative, Sobeknakht I, in Year 01 of king Nebiriau. Kebsi had inherited this office from his father Iymeru when the latter became vizier. Iymeru had in turn inherited it from his elder brother Aya junior, who died prematurely without children. Prior to this, Aya Junior had inherited the office from their father Aya who became vizier in Year 01 of Merhotepre.

He holds the titles king's son, royal sealer, overseer of a half-domain, Nomarch, Nomarch of Nekhen, Sobeknakht (sꜣ-nsw; ḫtmw-bjtj; jmj-rꜣ gs-pr; ḥꜣtj-ꜥ; ḥꜣtj-ꜥ n nḫb sbk-nḫt).

==== Khartoum 1087 ====
At Kerma, a travertine receptacle/vessel. naming the Nomarch of Nekhen, Sobeknakht (ḥꜣtj-ꜥ n nḫn sbk-nḫt).

=== Posthumous ===
==== Tomb Inscription, Elkab Tomb 66 (10) ====
Sobeknakht I is known from the inscriptions in the tomb of the Nomarch Sobeknakht II as the father of the latter. Furthermore, from these inscriptions it is clear that the wife of Sobeknakht I was a woman with the title hereditary princess and the name Nofru. Only recently his tomb was identified at Elkab. The inscriptions in the tomb are only badly preserved, but the mentioning of a woman called Nofru and remains of titles typical for Nomarchs make the identification very likely.

He holds the titles iripat, Nomarch, overseer of god's servants, Sobeknakht (jrj-pꜥt; ḥꜣtj-ꜥ; jmj-rꜣ ḥmw-nṯr sbk-nḫt)
