= Merhotepre Sobekhotep =

Egyptian king

Sobekhotep V or VI?
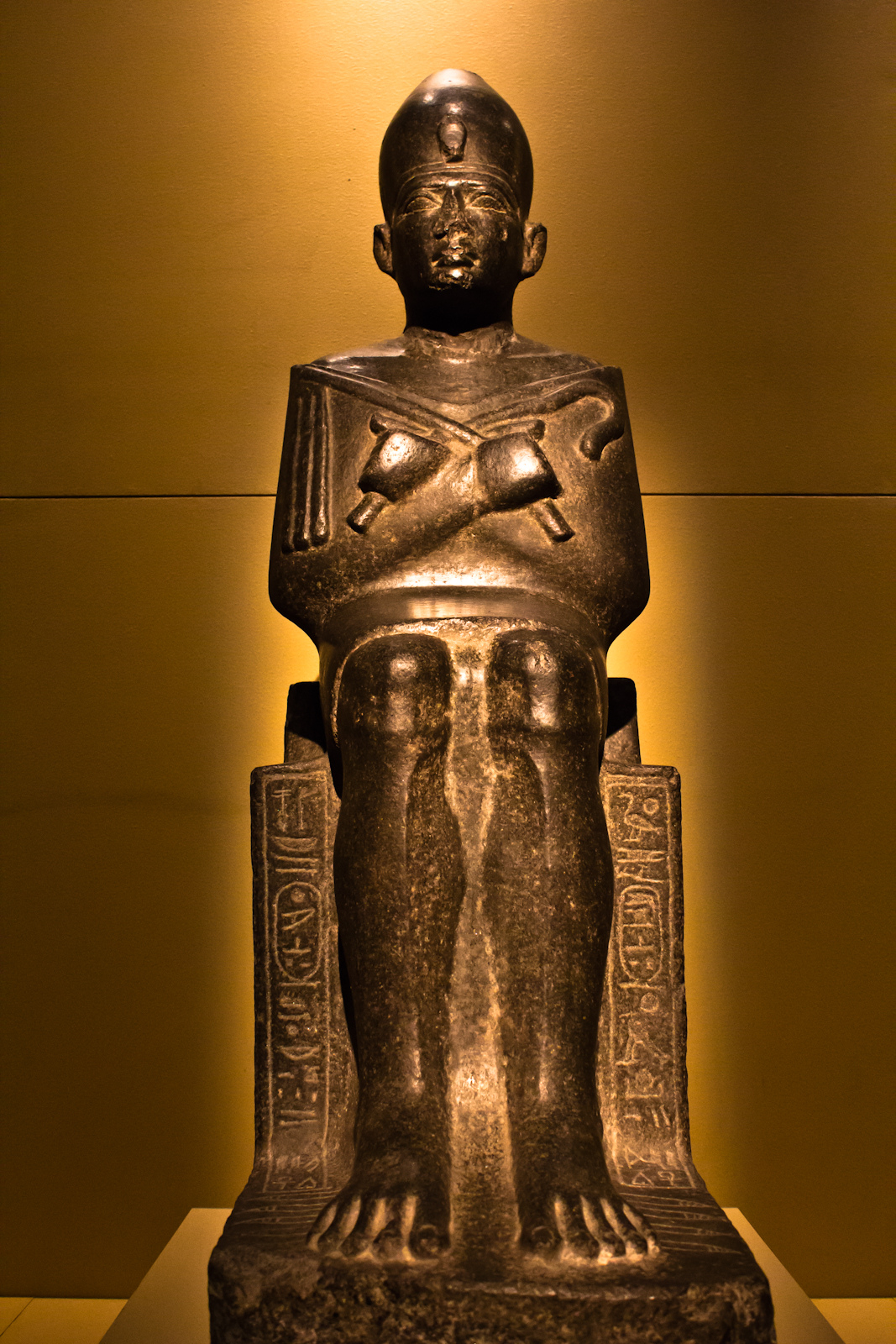
- A seated Statue of Merhotepre Sobekhotep V from the Cairo Museum, on display at the King Tut exhibit in Seattle. It clearly bears both his royal names.

Pharaoh
- Reign: c. 3(?) years
- Predecessor: Sobekhotep IV
- Successor: Sobekhotep VI
Royal titulary
Praenomen
Merhotepre
Mr-ḥtp-Rˁ
Beloved satisfaction of Ra
M23 t L2 t < ra U7 Htp t p >
Nomen
Sobekhotep
Sbk ḥtp
Sobek is satisfied
G39 N5 < sbk Htp t p >
- Father: Sobekhotep IV ?
- Mother: Nubhotepti'
- Dynasty: Late 13th Dynasty

Merhotepre Sobekhotep (also known as Sobekhotep V; Sobekhotep VI in older studies) was an Egyptian king of the late 13th Dynasty during the Second Intermediate Period.

== Attestation ==
Merhotepre Sobekhotep is mainly attested in Upper Egypt. Items can be separated between "Merhotepre", "Merhotepre Ini" and "Merhotepre Sobekhotep". There can be slight differences how they spell the name Merhotepre. Merhotepre Ini and his predecessor Merneferre Ay can be associated with Memphis-Faiyum region, while Merhotepre Sobekhotep seems more related to the Thebaid region.

[1] A seated statue of the king bearing his cartouche, now located in the Cairo Museum.

[2] From Karnak, a striding statue of Sobekhotep V Merhotepre.

[3] At Abydos, a stela mentions the prenomen "Merhotepre" writing in the same way as Merhotepre Sobekhotep.

[4] At Thebes, the Juridical Stela is dated to Year 1 of Nebiriau and mentions a decree issued in Year 1 of "Merhotepre". The stela have often been associated with Merhotepre Ini, but Merhotepre Sobekhotep is more likely.

=== Non-contemporary attestations ===
The Karnak King List 50 (52) dating to the time of Thutmose III, mentions "Merhotepre" between Sewahenra (49) and Wegaf (51). The entry can belong to either Merhotepre Ini or Merhotepre Sobekhotep, put the way Merhotepre is spelled suggests Merhotepre Sobekhotep. In addition, the rulers next to him support an earlier date.

The Turin King List, a king list redacted in the early Ramesside period, does not preserve the name of Merhotepre Sobekhotep. Kim Ryholt (1997) suggests Merhotepre Sobekhotep is missing from the list because he was listed in the line below that of Sobekhotep IV, a line lost in a lacuna of the papyrus.

While Franke and von Beckerath identified Merhotepre Sobekhotep with Merhotepre Ini, on the basis that they have the same prenomen, Ryholt showed in 1997 that he was listed in the lacuna below Sobekhotep IV. Furthermore, Ryholt points to the many rulers of the period who shared prenomen and yet were not the same person. Ryholt thus sees him as a separate ruler from Merhotepre Ini and credits him a reign of approximately 3 years.

== Theories ==
According to egyptologist Kim Ryholt he was the thirtieth pharaoh of the dynasty, while Darrell Baker believes instead that he was its twenty-ninth ruler. In older studies, Jürgen von Beckerath and Detlef Franke identified Merhotepre Sobekhotep with Merhotepre Ini, thereby making him Sobekhotep VI and the twenty-eighth ruler of the 13th Dynasty.

Merhotepre Sobekhotep's position following the reign of Sobekhotep IV is strongly suggested by the fact that five 13th Dynasty pharaohs are attested by genealogical seals which mention their parents. Four of these pharaohs are known to have been Sobekhotep III, Neferhotep I and his two brothers Sihathor, and Sobekhotep IV. But two genealogical seals bear name of the ruler's mother as The king's Mother Nubhotepti and the king as Sobekhotep. However, Sobekhotep III's mother was Jewhetibew whereas Neferhotep I, Sihathor and Sobekhotep IV were the sons of The King's Mother Kemi. This means that there was a different king named Sobekhotep who used genealogical seals in his lifetime. A further seal impression found at Tukh apparently mentions the father of this unknown king and while it is broken, and the father's name is unreadable, "it is clear from the traces that it was neither Monthhotep [Sobekhotep III's father] or Haankhef [Neferhotep I, Sihathor and Sobekhotep IV's father]". This seal impression is likely, therefore, to have been made by the paternal counterpart to the seal naming Nubhotepti. Since the seal impression bears a prenomen that appears to read mr-[...]-r' , Ryholt argues that we are dealing "with a king whose nomen was Sobekhotep and whose prenomen was constructed on the form mr-X-rˁ" such as Merhotepre or Merkawre Sobekhotep.

Ryholt notes, furthermore, that during the 13th Dynasty, royal genealogical seals were in use only during the period of the four identified kings, which succeeded each other on the throne: Sobekhotep III-Neferhotep I-Sihathor-Sobekhotep IV. Since during the 30+ years that followed in the reigns of Khahotepre Sobekhotep, Wahibre Ibiau and Merneferre Ay, no genealogical seals are attested for these three kings, it is safe to assume that "it had thus positively gone out of use by their reigns". Thus, Merkawre Sobekhotep would not have used it in his reign since he was the ninth successor of Sobekhotep IV. The 30-year gap also excludes the reigns of other intervening kings from the death of Sobekhotep IV and the accession of Merkawre Sobekhotep such as Sewadjkare Hori who ruled Egypt for five years as per the Turin King List. Therefore, king Merhotepre Sobekhotep, who is also attested by a statue from the Cairo Museum, would be the only candidate remaining to be the immediate successor of Sobekhotep IV and predecessor of Khahotepre Sobekhotep. Merhotepre Sobekhotep employed genealogical seals and his name was lost in a lacuna at the bottom of a column of the Turin canon. The successor of Merhotepre Sobekhotep, Khahotepre Sobekhotep, whose reign is mentioned on the Turin canon, also has a prenomen which is similar in style since it is built on an X-htp-rˁ formula, further confirming that both reigned in close succession.

== See also ==
- List of Pharaohs
