= Ahmose called Si-Tayit =

Ancient Egyptian official, Viceroy of Kush

- Viceroy of Kush
- Predecessor: none, first to hold office
- Successor: Ahmose called Turo
- Dynasty: 18th Dynasty
- Pharaoh: Ahmose I, Amenhotep I
- Children: Ahmose called Turo

Ahmose called Si-Tayit was possibly the first Viceroy of Kush. It is possible that the position was held by a son of Pharaoh Ahmose I before Ahmose called Si-Tayit was appointed Viceroy, but there is no conclusive evidence for such a Viceroy.

Before Si-Tayit the power in Kush seems to have been in the hands of a dignitary named Hormeni, who was the mayor of Hierakonpolis.

Ahmose called Si-Tayit served as Viceroy under both Ahmose I and Amenhotep I. Early in the reign of Amenhotep I, the position passed from Si-Tayit to his son Ahmose called Turo. The position of Viceroy was not hereditary, and the position did not pass to Turo's son Patjenna.
