= Ahmose called Turo =

Ancient Egyptian official, Viceroy of Kush

- Viceroy of Kush
- Predecessor: Ahmose called Si-Tayit
- Successor: Seni
- Dynasty: 18th Dynasty
- Pharaoh: Amenhotep I, Thutmose I
- Father: Ahmose called Si-Tayit
- Children: Ahmose called Patjenna
- Burial: Thebes

Ahmose called Turo (also Ture, Thure or Thuwre) was Viceroy of Kush under Amenhotep I and Thutmose I.

Ahmose called Turo was a son of Ahmose called Si-Tayit. Turo's son Ahmose called Patjenna would continue to serve the royal family during the reigns of Hatshepsut and Thutmose III.

Turo served under pharaoh Ahmose I as Commander of Buhen. Later he served as King's Son (of the Southern Region) under Amenhotep I (inscriptions in Semna, Uronarti). He served under Thutmose I according to inscriptions dating to year 1 and 3. Turo is mentioned in an inscription at West Silsila belonging to the vizier User. This inscription dates to the reign of Hatshepsut. This may be a posthumous mention of the Viceroy. It's possible there were family connections between Turo and User; Turo is shown leading Vizier Amethu's daughters in procession. (Amethu was User's father).

A coronation decree exists recording the accession of Thutmose I. This unique document is a royal decree issued on the king's coronation day to the Viceroy of Kush, Turo, informing him of the king's accession, fixing the full titulary, the royal name to be used in offering oblations, and the royal name to be used in the oath.

Behold, there is brought to thee this [commanded of the king in order to inform thee that my majesty has appeared as King of Upper and Lower Egypt upon the Horus-throne of the living, without his like forever. Make my titulary as follows:
Horus : "Mighty Bull, Beloved of Maat;"
Favorite of the Two Goddesses: "Shining in the Serpent-diadem, Great in Strength;"
Golden Horus: "Goodly in Years, Making Hearts Live;"
King of Upper and Lower Egypt: "Aakheperkare;"
Son of Re: "[Thutmose], Living forever, and ever.

The inscriptions in Sehel Island record how Thutmose I traveled south and found the canal of Senusret III (at the first cataract stopped up):

"Year 3, first month of the third season, day 22, under the majesty of the King of Upper and Lower Egypt, Aakheperkare (Thutmose I), who is given life. His majesty commanded to dig this canal, after he found it stopped up with stones, (so that) no ship sailed upon it. He sailed down-stream upon it, his heart glad, having slain his enemies. The king's-son, Turo."

== Burial ==
Ahmose called Turo was likely buried in Thebes. A statue of Turo was found in Deir el-Bahari and funerary cones were found in the Theban Necropolis.
