= Karnak King List =

Engraved list of Egyptian kings

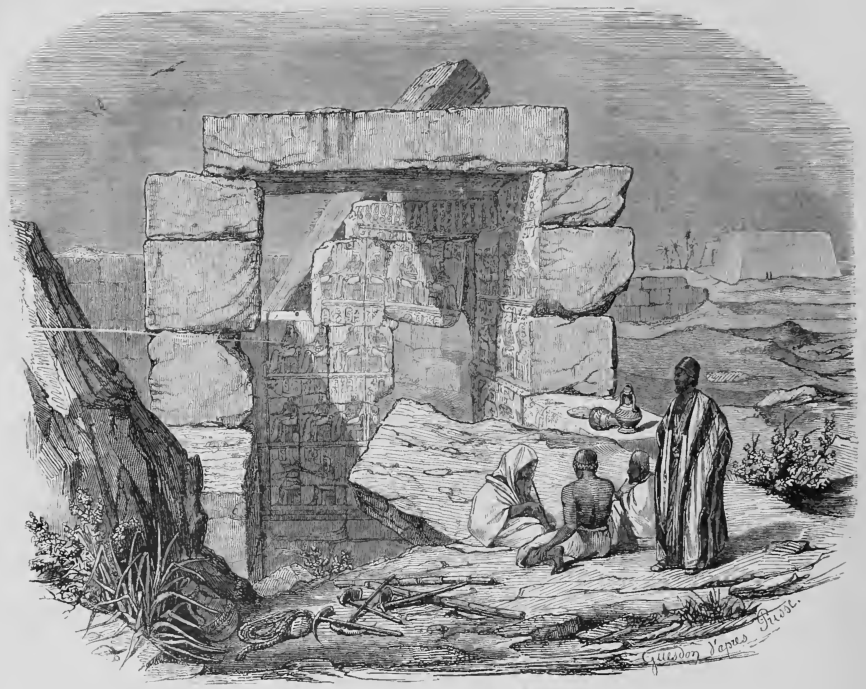
- Drawing of the list in 1843
- Created: c. 1450 BC
- Discovered: before 1826; Luxor, Luxor Governorate, Egypt
- Present location: Paris, Ile-de-France, France

The Karnak King List, a list of early Egyptian kings engraved in stone, was located in the southwest corner of the Festival Hall of Thutmose III, in the middle of the Precinct of Amun-Re, in the Karnak Temple Complex, in modern Luxor, Egypt. Composed during the reign of Thutmose III, it listed sixty-one kings beginning with Sneferu from Egypt's Old Kingdom. Only the names of thirty-nine kings are still legible, and one (Intef the Elder) is not written in a cartouche.

It is not a complete list of the Egyptian pharaohs, as other kings are known from other ancient lists, but this list is valuable as it contains the names of kings of the First and Second Intermediate Periods, which are omitted in most other king lists.

It was first described by James Burton in 1825. In 1843, a German expedition directed by Egyptologist Karl Lepsius was traveling up the Nile River to Karnak. A French adventurer, Émile d'Avennes, dismantled and stole the blocks containing the king list one night in order to secure it for France, and sent it home. Severely damaged, it is now on display at the Louvre in Paris.

== Drawing of the list ==
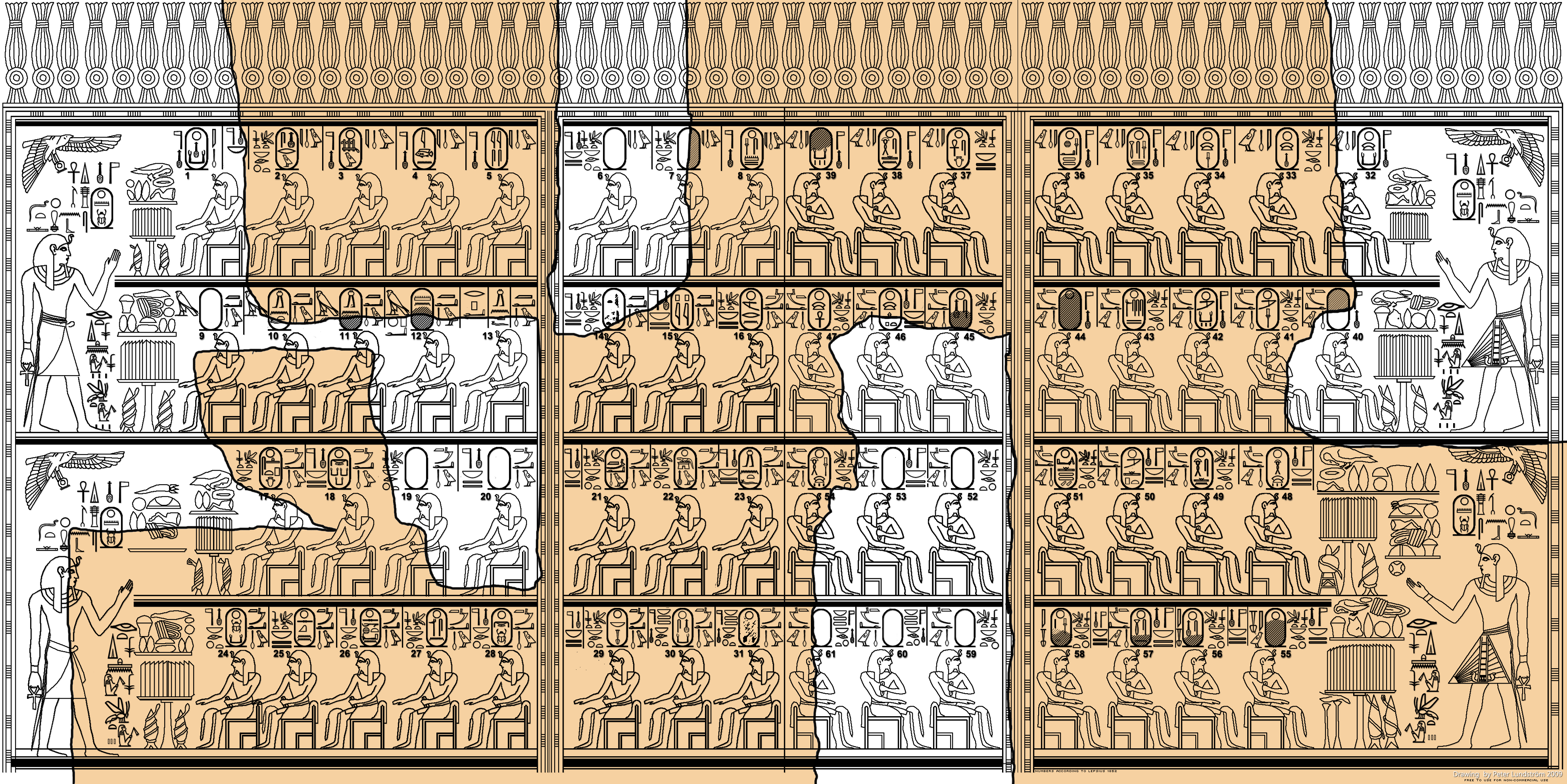
Drawing of the Karnak King List. The colored bits remain, the white are more or less lost.

== Description of the list ==
The list features the name of the pharaoh followed by the actual one inscribed on the list. The list comprises three sections and is divided at the center. The numbering follows Lepsius, counting from the sides, toward the center. Pharaohs that are known have the damaged part of the inscribed name in parentheses.

Left side
Top Row
#	Ruler	Inscribed name	Hieroglyphs
1.	Neferkare I?	(Neferkare) (Note: Original portion is lost but it can be inferred that Neferkare I was placed here.)	nTr nfr < ra nfr kA > P11 xrw nTr nfr nb(reconstitution)
2.	Sneferu	Sneferu	sw t bit t nb ir ra t < s nfr r w > P11 xrw w
3.	Sahure	Sahure	nTr nfr < ra sAH w > P11 xrw w
4.	Nyuserre Ini	Ini	nTr nfr < i in n > P11 xrw w
5.	Djedkare Isesi	Isesi	nTr nfr < i i s s > P11 xrw w
6.	Names lost		
7.	Names lost		
8.	Sekhemre Sementawy Djehuty	Sekhemre Sementawy	nTr nfr < ra abA s mn N17 N17 > P11 xrw w
Second Row
#	Ruler	Inscribed name	Hieroglyphs
9.	Name lost		
10.	Intef II	Intef	G5 HASH < ini n&t&f > mAa a xrw w
11.	Intef I?	In(tef)	G5 HASH < ini n HASH > mAa a xrw w
12.	Mentuhotep I	Men(tuhotep) (Note: Accompanied by the Horus name "Tepia", meaning "the ancestor", which is still visible next to it.)	G5 D1 p a < mn n HASH > mAa a xrw w
13.	Intef the Elder	Intef (Note: Name is not written inside a cartouche)	r p a ini n&t&f mAa a xrw w
14.	Name lost		
15.	Pepi I Meryre	Pepi	nTr nfr nb N19 < p p i i > mAa a xrw w
16.	Merenre Nemtyemsaf I	Merenre	sw t bit t nb N19 < ra U7 r n > U4 a xrw w
Third Row
#	Ruler	Inscribed name	Hieroglyphs
17.	Amenemhat I	Sehotepibre	sw t bit t nb ir ra t < ra s Htp t p ib > U4 a xrw w
18.	Amenemhat II	Nubkaure	nTr nfr nb N19 < ra nbw kA kA kA > U4 a xrw w
19.	Names lost		
20.	Names lost		
21.	Amenemhat IV	Maakherure	nTr nfr nb N19 sw t bit t nb ir ra t < ra U5 a xrw w > U4 a xrw w
22.	Sobekneferu	Sobekneferu	sw t bit t nb ir ra t < ra sbk nfr w > U4 a xrw w
23.	Sehetepkare Intef?	Intef	nTr nfr nb N19 < ini n&t&f > U4 a xrw w
Bottom Row
#	Ruler	Inscribed name	Hieroglyphs
24.	Senusret I	Kheperkare	nTr nfr nb ir ra t < ra xpr kA > U4 a xrw w
25.	Seqenenre Tao	Seqenenre	sw t bit t nb N19 < ra z q n n > U4 a xrw w
26.	Senakhtenre Ahmose	Senakhtenre	nTr nfr nb ir ra t < ra z xt x t D40 n > U4 a xrw w
27.	Bebiankh	Seuserenre	sw t bit t nb ir ra t < ra wsr s n > U4 a xrw w
28.	Nubkheperre Intef	Nubkheperre	nTr nfr nb ir ra t < ra nbw xpr > U4 a xrw w
29.	Mentuhotep II	Nebhepetre	nTr nfr nb N19 sw t bit t nb ir ra t < ra nb zmA > U4 a xrw w
30.	Mentuhotep III	Seneferkare	nTr nb N19 nfr nb ir ra t < ra s nfr kA > U4 a xrw w
31.	Mentuhotep IV?	(Nebtawy)re	nTr nb N19 nfr nb ir ra t < ra HASH > U4 a xrw w

Right side
Top Row
#	Ruler	Inscribed name	Hieroglyphs
32.	Senusret III?	(Khakaure) (Note: Original portion is lost but it can be inferred that Senusret III was placed here.)	nTr nfr < ra xa kA > P11 xrw w (reconstitution)
33.	Sobekhotep IV	Khaneferre	sw t bit t nb ir ra t < ra xa nfr > P11 xrw w
34.	Neferhotep I	Khasekhemre	nTr nfr < ra xa abA > P11 xrw w
35.	Sobekhotep III	Sekhemre Sewadjtawy	nTr nfr < ra abA s wAD N19 > P11 xrw w
36.	Sobekhotep I	Sekhemre Khutawy	nTr nfr < ra x a abA N19 > P11 xrw w
37.	Amenemhat VI	Sankhibre	sw t bit t nb N19 < ra s anx ib > P11 xrw w
38.	Nebiryraw I	Sewadjenre	nTr nfr < ra s sk mDAt n > P11 xrw w
39.	Snaaib?	(…)khau(re)	nTr nfr < HASH kA Z2 > P11 xrw w
Second Row
#	Ruler	Inscribed name	Hieroglyphs
40.	Name lost		
41.	Neferhotep II	Mersekhemre	sw t bit t nb ir ra t < ra U7 abA > U4 a xrw w
42.	Sobekhotep VII	Merkaure	nTr nfr < ra U7 kA Z2 > U4 a xrw w
43.	Sobekhotep VIII?	Seusertawy	sw t bit t nb ir ra t < ra s s s wsr N17 N17 > U4 a xrw w
44.	Unknown	(…)(re)	nTr nfr < ra HASH > U4 a xrw w
45.	Senusret IV?	Senefer(ib)re	sw t bit t nb ir ra t < ra s nfr HASH > U4 a xrw w
46.	Sobekhotep VI	Khahotepre	nTr nfr nb N19 < ra xa Htp t p > U4 a xrw w
47.	Khaankhre Sobekhotep	Khaankhre	sw t bit t nb ir ra t < ra xa anx > U4 a xrw w
Third Row
#	Ruler	Inscribed name	Hieroglyphs
48.	Sekhemre Wahkhau Rahotep	Wahkhaure	nTr nfr nb N19 < ra sk xa Z2 > U4 a xrw w
49.	Sewahenre Senebmiu	Sewahenre	sw t bit t nb ir ra t < ra s sk mDAt n > U4 a xrw w
50.	Merhotepre Sobekhotep	Merhotepre	nTr nfr nb N19 < ra U7 Htp t p > U4 a xrw w
51.	Wegaf	Khutawire	sw t bit t nb ir ra t < ra D43 mDAt N19 N21 N21 > U4 a xrw w
52.	Names lost		
53.	Names lost		
54.	Sobekemsaf I	Sekhemre Wadjkhau	sw t bit t nb ir ra t < ra abA sk xa Z2 > U4 a xrw w
Bottom Row
#	Ruler	Inscribed name	Hieroglyphs
55.	Unknown	(…)re	nTr nfr nb N19 sw t bit t nb ir ra t < ra HASH > P11 zmA w
56.	Seneferankhre?	Senefer(…)re	nTr nfr nb N19 sw t bit t nb ir ra t < ra s nfr HASH > P11 zmA
57.	Sewadjare Mentuhotep?	Sewadj(n)re	nTr nfr nb N19 < ra s wAD n > U4 a xrw w
58.	Sekhemre Shedwaset?	Sekhemre (…)	nTr nfr nb N19 sw t bit t nb ir ra t < ra abA Z1 HASH > P11 zmA
59.	Names lost		
60.	Names lost		
61.	Names lost		

== Gallery ==
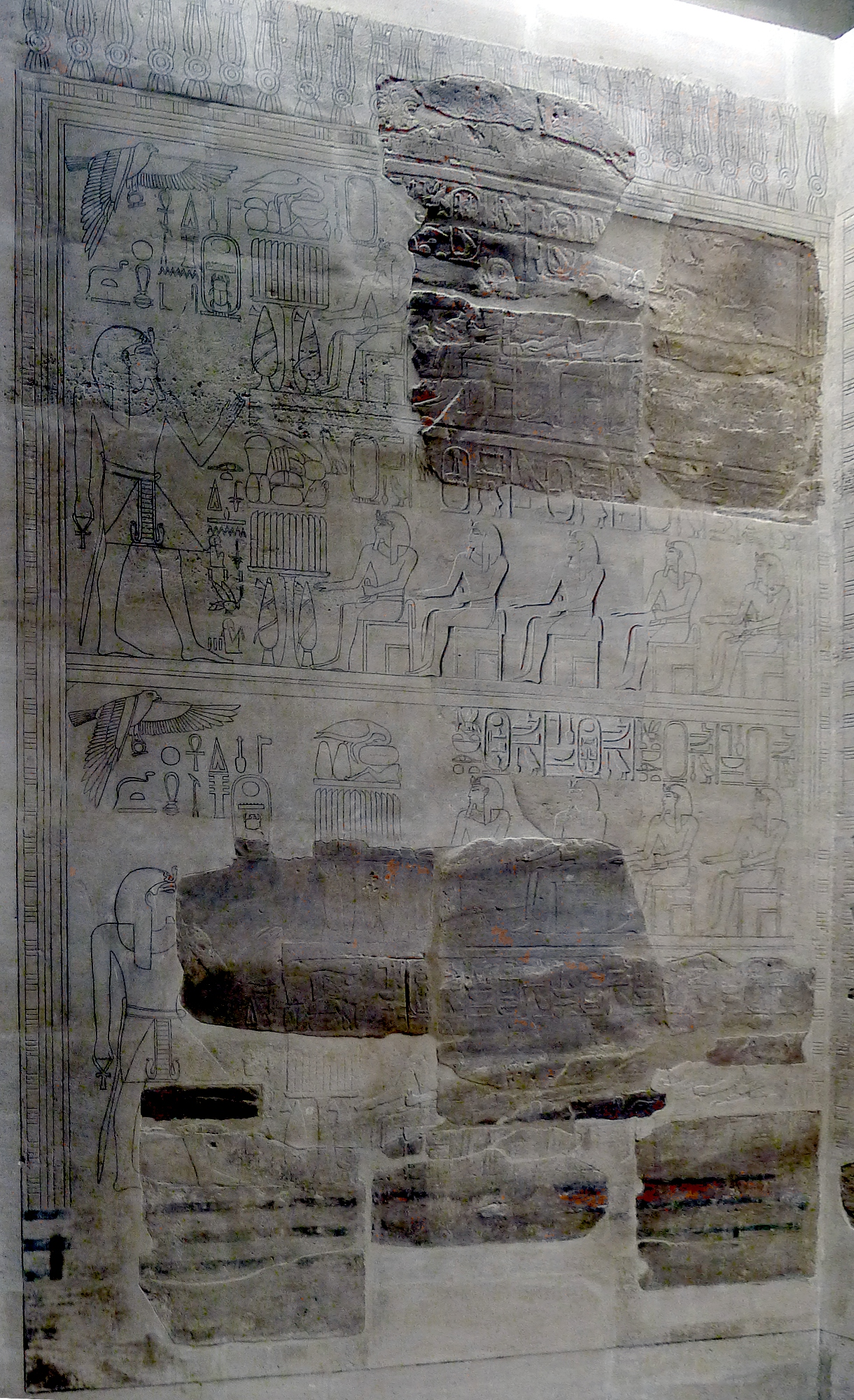
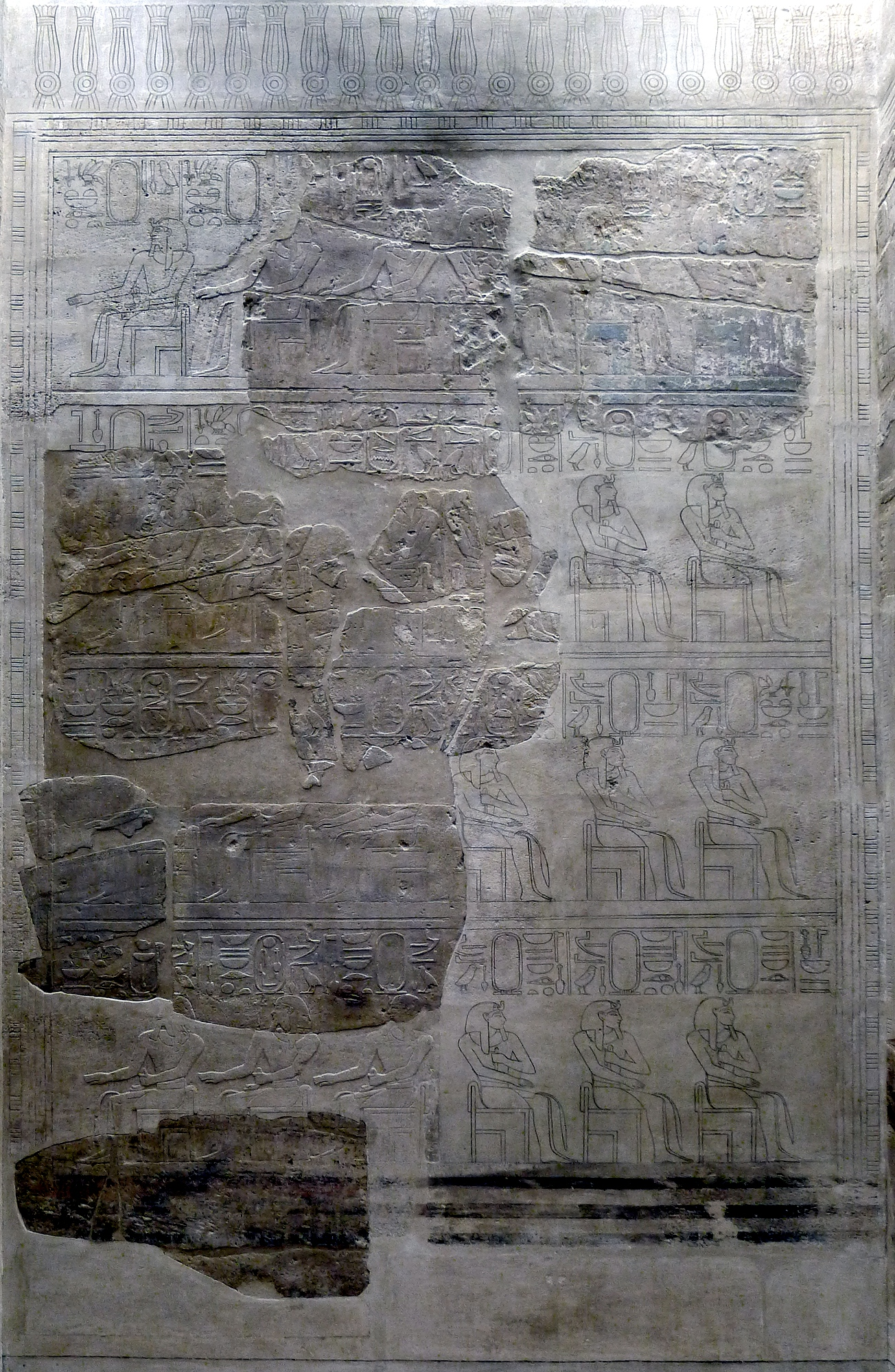
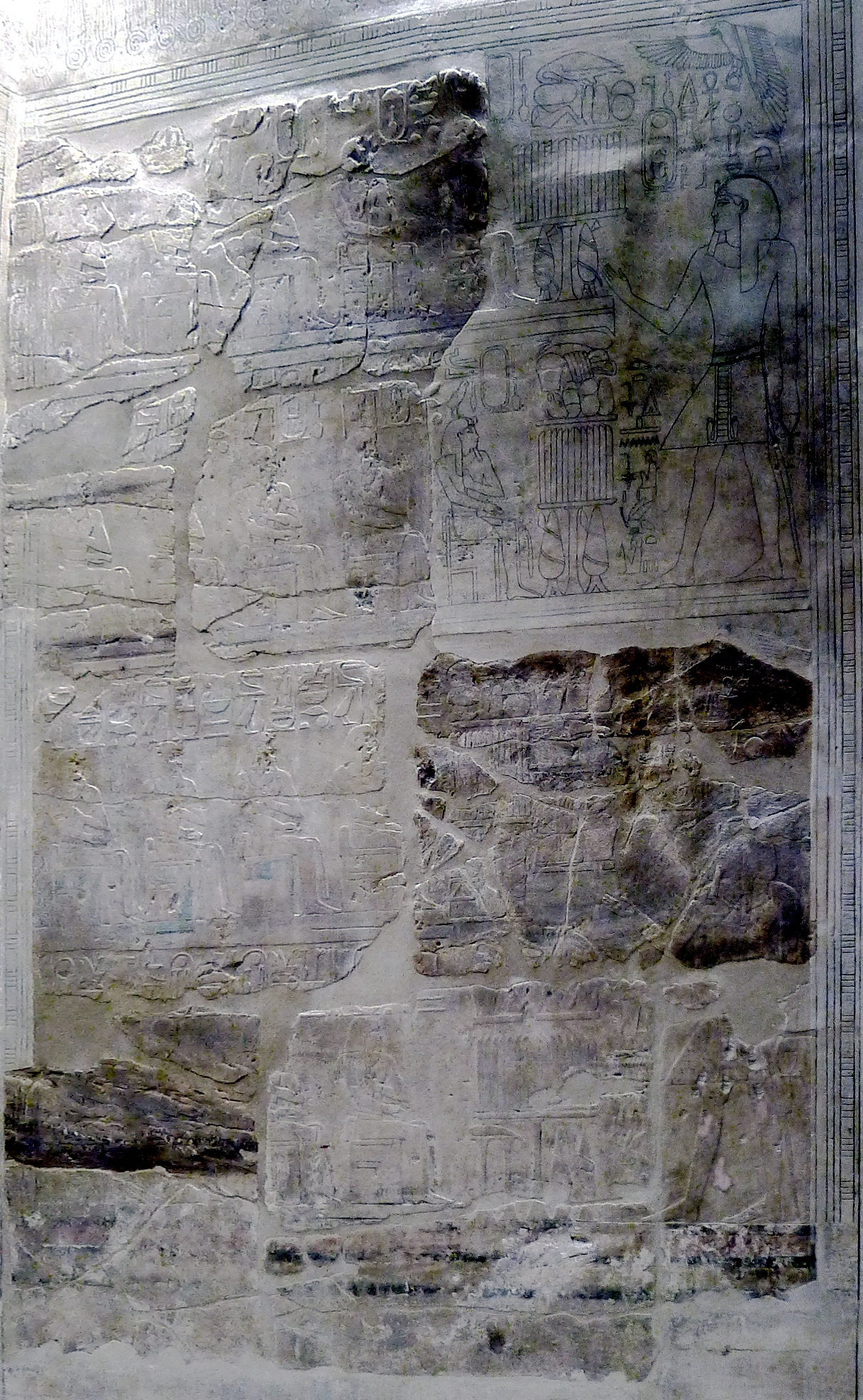
Detailed photos of the actual list in the Louvre

== See also ==
- Abydos King List
- Manetho King List
- Palermo Stone
- Ramesseum king list
- Saqqara Tablet
- Turin King List
- Medinet Habu king list
