= Sobeknakht (king's daughter) =

- King's Daughter
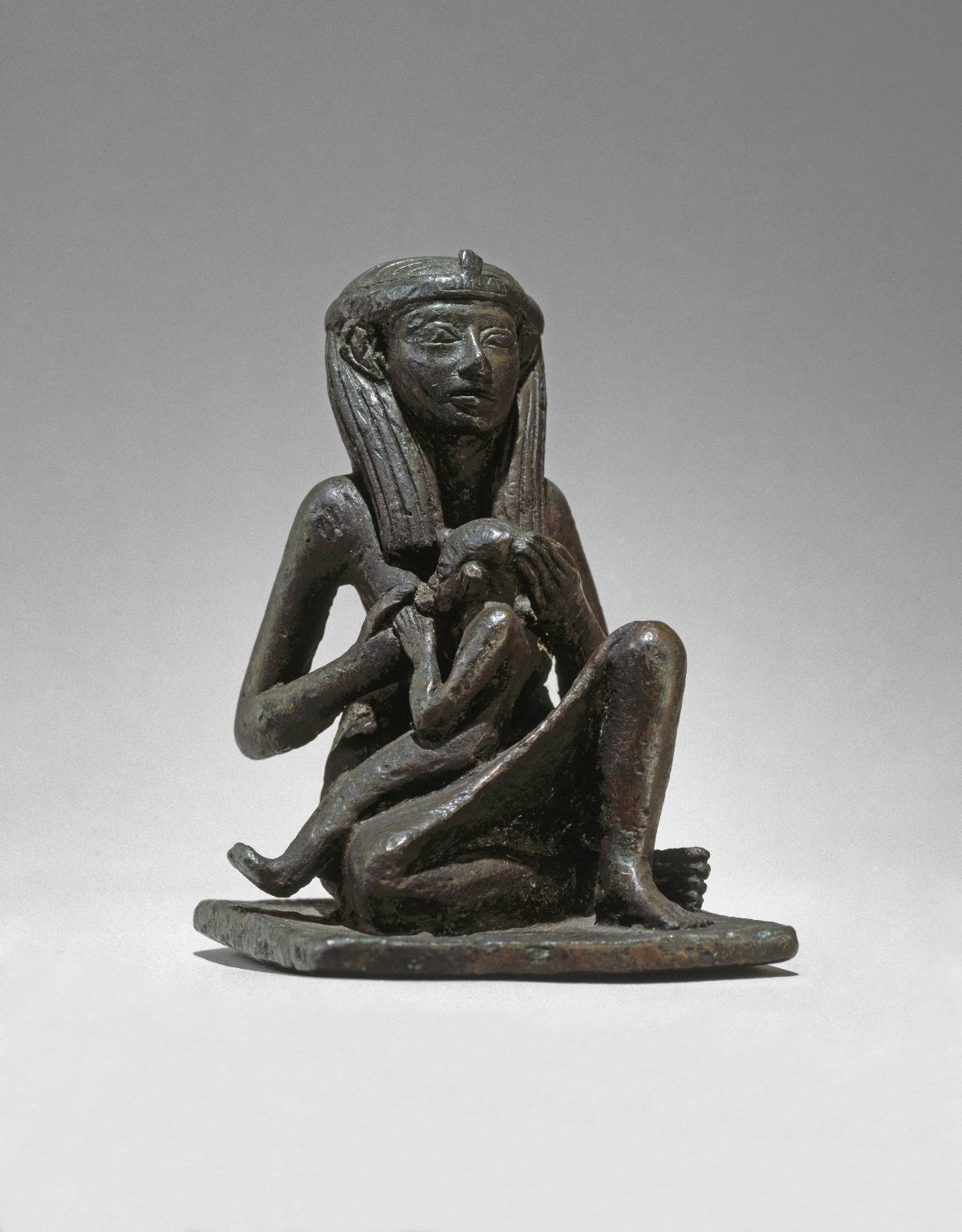
- Copper statuette of Sobeknakht
- Dynasty: 12th or 13th Dynasty

Sobeknakht was a king's daughter during the late 12th Dynasty or early 13th Dynasty of Ancient Egypt. She was the daughter of an unknown king and is shown on a copper statuette with a suckling child who is a prince.

== Biography ==
King's daughter Sobeknakht is not known from other sources than a statuette made of arsenical copper. Copper statues/statuettes are especially known during the reign of Amenemhat III into the early 13th Dynasty, before political turmoil makes such artworks less common. Apparently, Sobeknakht was the daughter of an unknown king of this period, and mother to an unknown prince. Thus, her husband might also have been a king. However, the statuette may be open for other interpretations.

== Copper statuette of Sobeknakht ==
The copper statuette of Sobeknakht shows great skills in design and manufacturing of metal statuary. It represents a woman suckling a male child. This type of scene may reflect Isis-Horus and later Mary-Jesus, thus showing roots back to the Middle Kingdom of Ancient Egypt. The inscription refers to "hereditary noblewoman", Sobeknakht. She is wearing the uraeus-cobra indicating that she is a princess. Also the child is shown as a prince. The statuette may be interpreted as celebrating a birth, signal a reigning king's devotion to his mother or a wish for divine help in conceiving a child who would become Egypt's king. It is part of the collection of the Brooklyn Museum.
