= Sewahenre Senebmiu =

Egyptian pharaoh

- Sonbmiu, Sonbmijew, Senebmaui
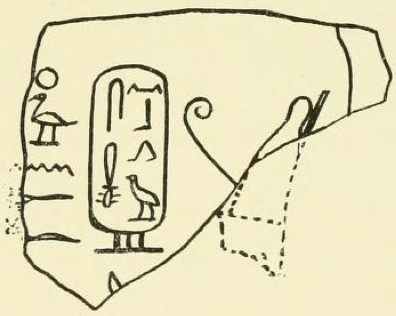
- Drawing by Wallis Budge of a fragment of a limestone stele of Senebmiu, from Gebelein.

Pharaoh
- Reign: after 1660 BC, possibly for 1 year
- Predecessor: uncertain, Se[...]kare (von Beckerath)
- Successor: unknown
Royal titulary
Prenomen
Sewahenre
Sw3ḥ-n-Rˁ
M23 t L2 t < ra s wAH Y1 n >
Turin canon:
Uncertain attribution
Se[...]enre
< N5 HASH Y1 n >
Karnak king list:
Sewahenre
Sw3ḥ-n-Rˁ
< ra s wAH Y1 n >
Nomen
Senebmiu
Snb-miw
G39 N5 N36 Z1 f < s n b mi D54 w >
- Dynasty: 13th Dynasty

Sewahenre Senebmiu (also Sonbmiu) is a poorly attested Egyptian pharaoh during the Second Intermediate Period, thought to belong to the late 13th Dynasty.

== Attestations ==
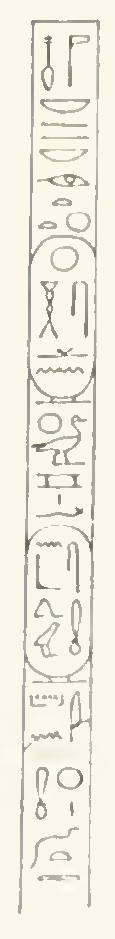
Inscription of Senebmiu from Deir el-Barhi.

Senebmiu is a poorly attested pharaoh. Contemporary attestations of Senebmiu are few and all originate from Upper Egypt. Darrell Baker and Daphna Ben Tor suggest that this may signal that the 13th Dynasty had lost control of Lower and possibly Middle Egypt at the time.

=== Gebelein, stela (BM EA 24898) ===
A fragment of a limestone stele discovered by G.W. Fraser in 1893 in Gebelein and now in the British Museum (BM EA 24898) bears the mention "The son of Ra, of his body, Senebmiu". The stele once depicted the king wearing the double crown and probably making an offering, but most of the relief is lost.

=== Deir el-Bahri, naos (Cairo JE 46196) ===
An attestation of Senebmiu was uncovered in the mortuary temple of Mentuhotep II at Deir el-Bahri, where the side of a small naos is inscribed with the king's titulary.

=== Qurna, staff (Moscow I.1.a. 1801, a, b) ===
A staff bearing the king's prenomen and inscribed for the "Royal sealer, overseer of marshland dwellers Senebni" was found in a now-lost tomb in Qurna on the west bank of the Nile opposite Karnak.

=== Karnak King List ===
The Karnak king list entry 49, redacted during the reign of Thutmose III, mentions his prenomen Sewahenre after Sekhemre Wahkhau Rahotep.

=== Turin King List ===
The Turin canon, redacted during the time of Ramesses II, is severely damaged after the record of Sobekhotep VII and the identity and chronological order of the last 19 kings of the 13th Dynasty is impossible to ascertain from the document. Senebmiu's prenomen Sewahenre may have been partially preserved on column 8, line 16 of the papyrus, which reads Se[...]enre. Darrell Baker and Kim Ryholt note that this attribution is far from certain as it could also correspond to another obscure king of this period with the name Sekhaenre.

== Theories ==
According to Egyptologist Jürgen von Beckerath, he was the forty-first king of the 13th Dynasty. Alternatively, Darrell Baker proposes that he may have been its fifty-seventh ruler. Kim Ryholt only specifies that Senebmiu's short reign dates to between 1660 BC and 1649 BC.

== See also ==
- List of pharaohs
