= Nekhen (nome) =

Subnational administrative division of Ancient Egypt

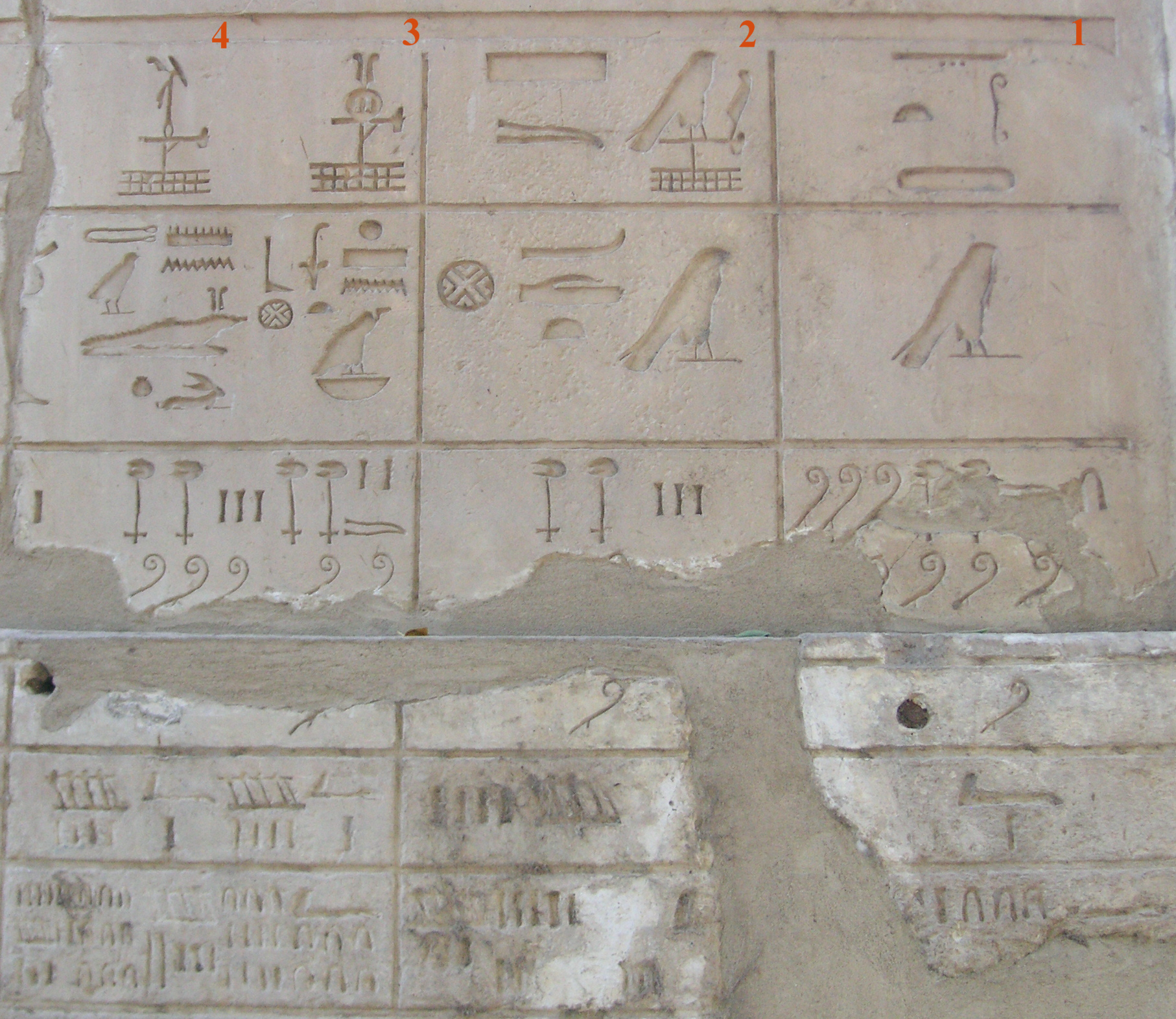
The nome mentioned on the White Chapel of Senusret I (no. 3)

Nekhen was the name of the third Upper Egyptian nome (province). Nekhen is also the Egyptian name of Hierakonpolis, one of the main towns in the province. During the Ptolemaic Greek and Roman eras, the province was called Latopolites, for Esna was in this period the main town and its Greek name was Latopolis or Letopolis. The main towns in the province were Nekhen, Elkab and Esna. The province is already mentioned in inscriptions of the Old Kingdom.
