= Nebiryraw I =

Ancient Egyptian king

Sewadjenre Nebiryraw
- Nebiryerawet, Nebiriau
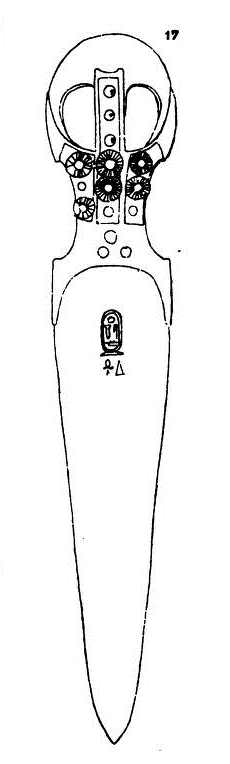
- Dagger of Nebiryraw I (JE 33702)

Pharaoh
- Reign: 26 regnal years 1627-1601 BC
- Predecessor: Seankhenre Mentuhotepi
- Successor: Nebiryraw II
Royal titulary
Horus name
Sewadjtawy
S.w3ḏ-t3wj
He who causes the Two Lands to flourish
G5	s M13 N17 N17
Nebty name
Netjerkheperu
Nṯrj-ḫprw
Divine of transformations
G16	R8 L1 Z3
Golden Horus
Neferkha
Nfr-ḫa
Golden falcon, perfect of appearances
G8 F35 N28
Prenomen
Sewadjenre
S.w3ḏ-n-Rˁ
He who is made to flourish by Ra
M23 t L2 t < N5 s M13 Y1 n >
Karnak king list: Sewadjenre
S.w3ḏ-n-Rˁ
He who is made to flourish by Ra
< ra s wAD mDAt n >
Nomen
Nebiryraw
Nb-jrj-r-3w
The possessor of all< nb i r Z4 r F40 >
Turin canon: Nebiryawre
Nb jrj 3w Rˁ
The possessor of all (things of) Ra
< ra nb i r y Aw Z7 mDAt Z2 >
- Children: Nebiryraw II?
- Died: 1601 BC
- Dynasty: 16th Dynasty

Sewadjenre Nebiryraw (also Nebiriau I, Nebiryerawet I) was an ancient Egyptian king of the Theban-based 16th Dynasty, during the Second Intermediate Period.

== Attestations ==
His main attestation is in the Thebaid region, the Juridical Stela preserving his names and provides the highest attestation Year 1. He is known from several seals.

[1] At Thebes, the Juridical Stela, a well known administrative document dated to his regnal Year 1. This stela also mentions a predecessor king "Merhotepre", which may be Merhotepre Sobekhotep. On the stela his nomen is written as Neb-iri-er-au (nb-iri-Ꜣw).

[2] At Hu, a cemetery yielded a copper dagger with the prenomen of Nebiriau that was discovered by Flinders Petrie in the late 1890s.

[3] Nebiryraw is also depicted along with the goddess Maat on a small stela which is part of the Egyptian collection located in Bonn.

[4] Seals. All the seals issued by Nebiryraw were made of clay or frit rather than the usual steatite which implies there were no mining expeditions dispatched to the Eastern Desert region of Egypt during his reign. Two seals of this king were found at Lisht which at the time was part of the Hyksos realm; this finding may demonstrate diplomatic contacts between the Theban dynasty and the Hyksos during Nebiryraw's reign, although this is uncertain. In the Petrie Museum, see UC 11608 and some faience scarabs (UC 11609, 11610, 11611, 11612) do not give royal titles, and may be read as a blessings instead.

=== Non-contemporary attestations ===
==== Karnak King List ====
In the 18th Dynasty, the Karnak King List #38 (33) mentions Sewadjenra (swꜢḏ.n-rꜤ) between Sankhibra (37) and ...khaure (39).

==== Turin King List ====
In the 19th Dynasty, the Turin King List 11:05 mentions "The Dual King Nebiriawra (nb-iri-(r)-Ꜣw(t)) reigned 26 years ...". Here he is between Se...en...ra (11:04) and Nebitawra (11:06). The Turin King List uses another variant of the nomen compared with the Juridical Stela. On the Turin Canon he is credited with a 26-year-long reign and was succeeded by his namesake Nebiryraw II, who may have been his son. His highest attestation is Year 1 and there are hardly enough archaeological finds to support a reign of 26 years.

==== Other sources ====
Nebiryraw's throne name Sewadjenre (along with the epithets "good god" and "deceased") appears on the base of a bronze statuette of the god Harpocrates now in Cairo (JE 38189), along with other royal names, two of them – Ahmose and Binpu – apparently belonging to princes of the 17th Dynasty which would replace the 16th Dynasty shortly thereafter. The statuette also mentions a "good god Neferkare, deceased" which is generally believed to be the throne name of Nebiryraw's purported son and successor, Nebiryraw II. The statuette is clearly non-contemporary, however, since the cult of Harpocrates was introduced during the Ptolemaic period i.e. about 1500 years after the people named on the statuette had lived.
