= Elkab =

Archaeological site in Egypt

Elkab ⲛ̀ⲭⲁⲃ الكاب
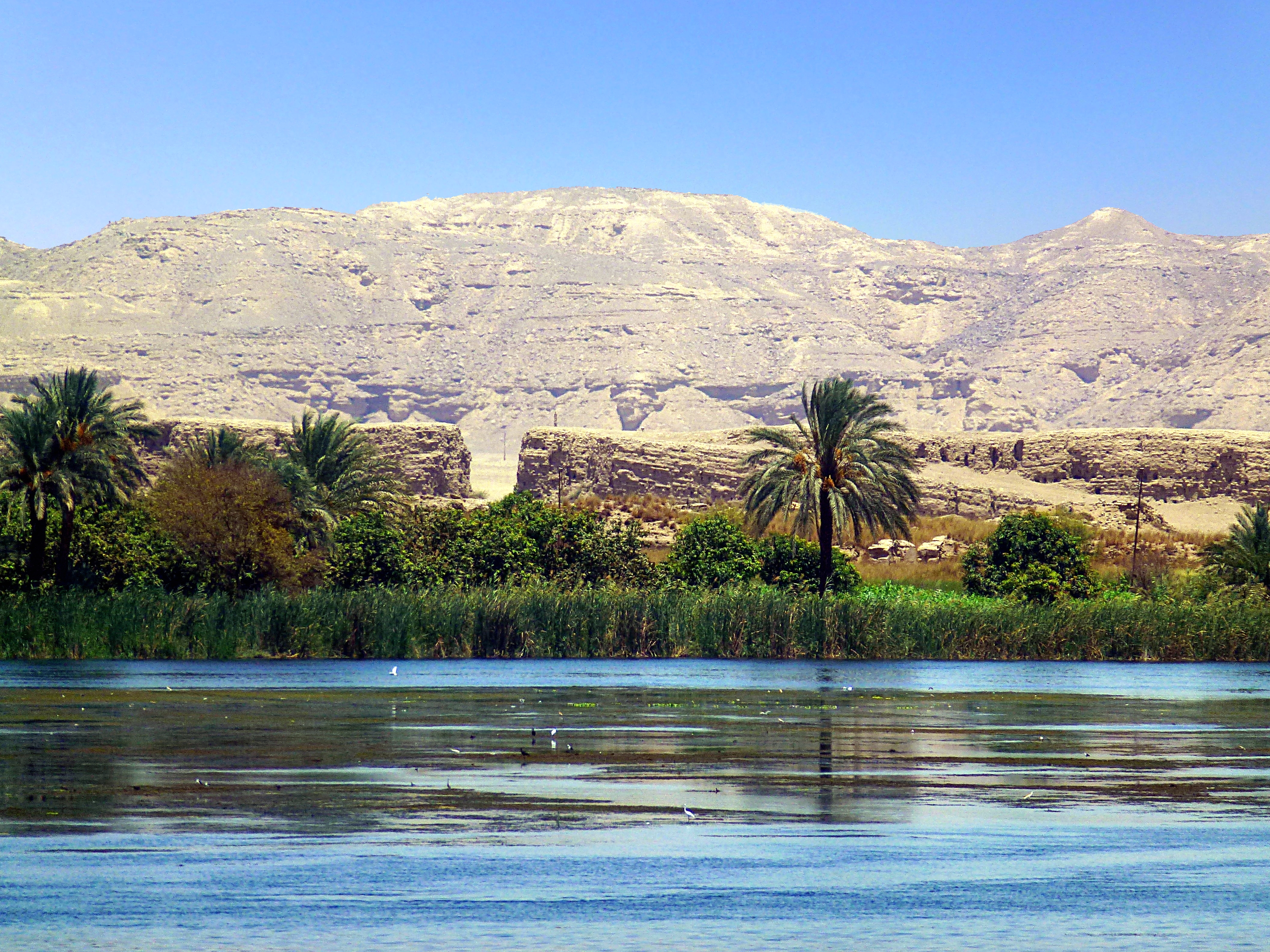
- View of the site of Nekheb (modern Elkab)

- Location in Egypt
- Coordinates: 25°7′8″N 32°47′52″E
- Country: Egypt
- Governorate: Aswan
- Time zone: UTC+2 (EST)

Eileithuia / el-Kab

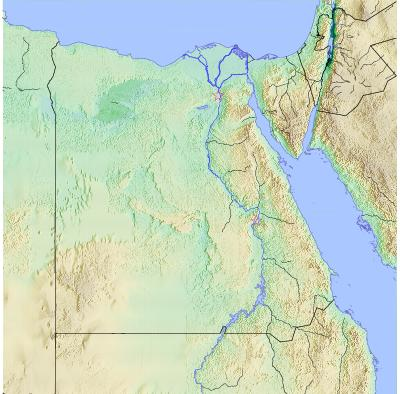

Elkab, also spelled El-Kab or El Kab, is an Upper Egyptian site on the east bank of the Nile at the mouth of the Wadi Hillal about 80 kilometres (50 mi) south of Luxor (ancient Thebes). Elkab was called Nekheb in the Egyptian language (Coptic: ⲛ̀ⲭⲁⲃ enkhab, Late Coptic: [ənˈkɑb]), a name that refers to Nekhbet, the goddess depicted as a white vulture. In Greek it was called Eileithyias polis, "city of the goddess Eileithyia".

Elkab consists of prehistoric and ancient Egyptian settlements, rock-cut tombs of the early Eighteenth Dynasty (1550–1295 BC), remains of temples dating from the Early Dynastic period (3100–2686 BC) to the Ptolemaic Kingdom (332–30 BC), as well as part of the walls of a Coptic monastery. This site was first scientifically excavated by James Quibell at the end of the nineteenth century, but other archaeologists have spent time at this site include Frederick William Green, Archibald Henry Sayce, Joseph John Tylor, and Somers Clarke. However, Belgian archaeologists took over the project in 1937, and it has remained in their hands since then. Much of the research done at this site took place within the town enclosure of Elkab. However, since the 1980s the work has shifted more to the north and north east of the town.

== Description of site ==
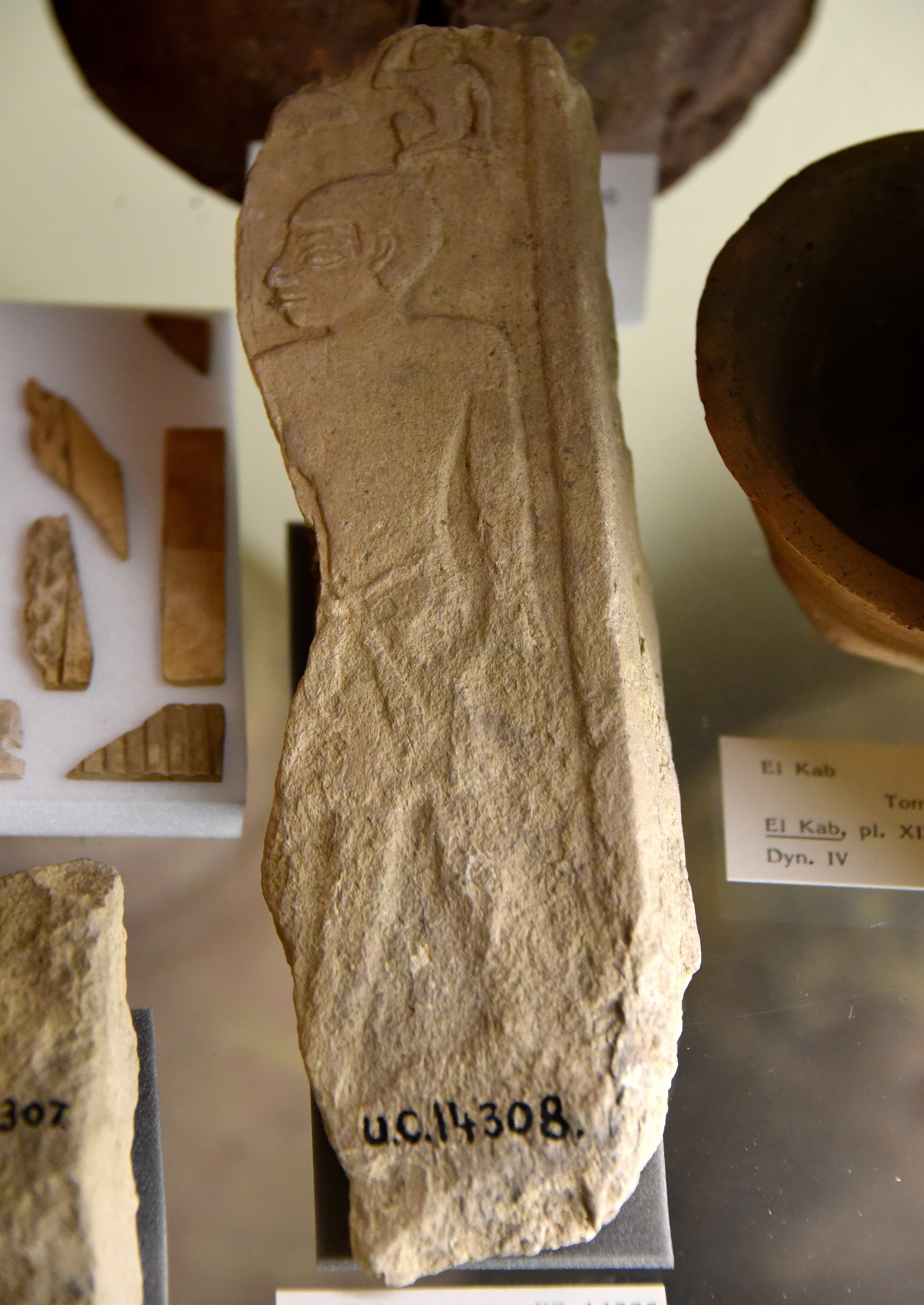
Fragment of a relief block or stela. Standing male figure below hieroglyphs. Limestone. 4th Dynasty. From the mastaba of Kameni (Ka-Mena) at El-Kab (Nekheb), Egypt. Petrie Museum, London

M22 mwt nb b t niwt
nḫb(t)
in hieroglyphs
Era: Old Kingdom
(2686–2181 BC)

M22 b n nw V1
nḫb(w)
in hieroglyphs
Era: Middle Kingdom
(2055–1650 BC)

Elkab is in Upper Egypt, located on the east side of the Nile River, almost to the opposite of Hierakonpolis (on the other side of the river) and about fifty miles south of Thebes. With the way the river meandered and eroded the rocks and sand, the Nile River is almost level with the town, but according to Somers Clarke in his journal article “El-Kab and the Great Wall,” “in its early youth the town must have stood well above the flood waters.” The site could be described as a bay between sandstone cliffs to the north and south, and this same sandstone was used to build the temples found in this site.

== First excavation ==
During Quibell's first excavation, most of the work was done in the cemetery east of the town. There Quibell found many buried skeletons, all with their heads pointing towards the north, and none of them mummified. This being the earliest cemetery at the site, pots, bead, paint slabs and mirrors were found in these burials, but no papyrus or text were found anywhere.

== Ancient Nekheb ==
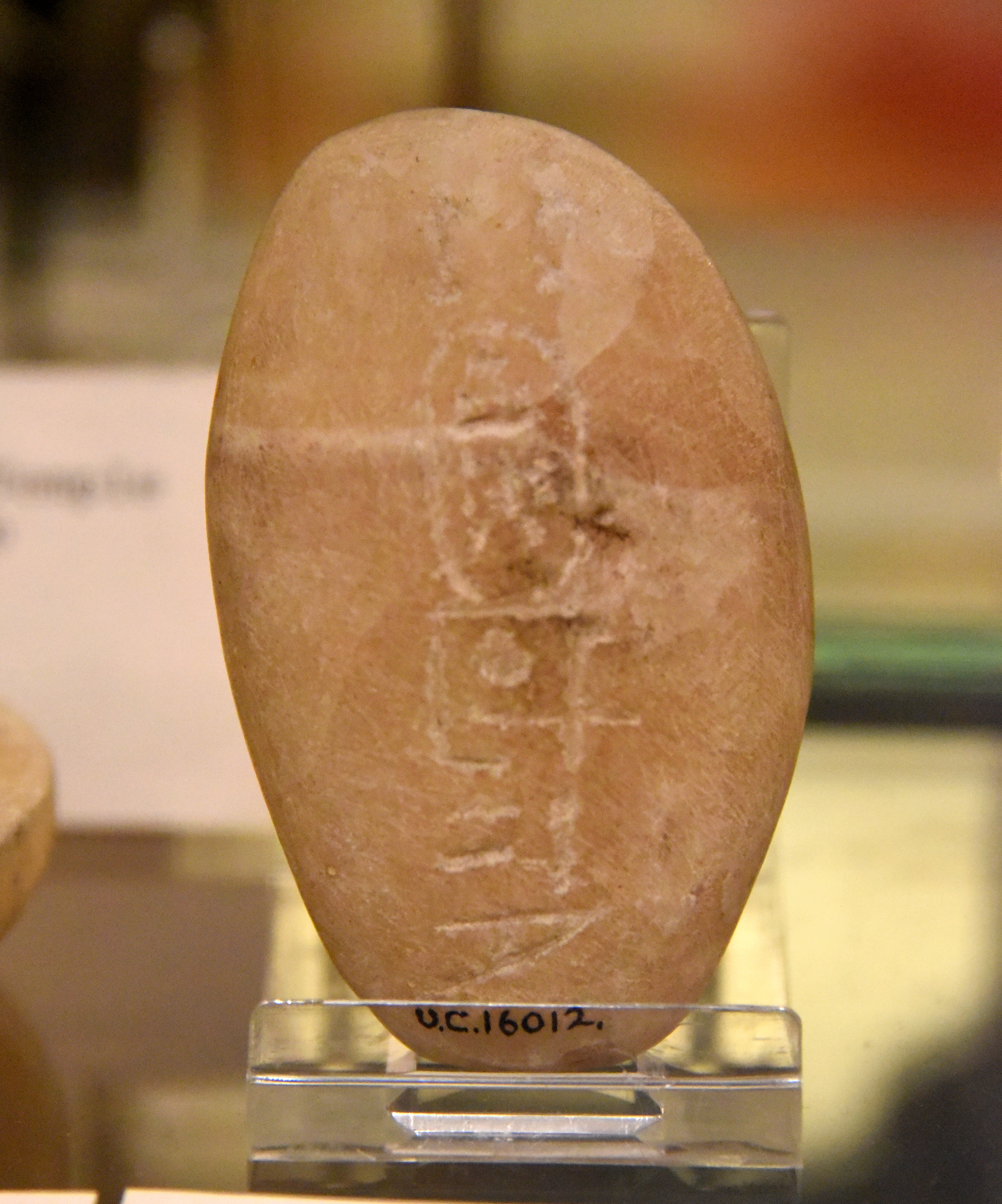
Calcite model shell, inscribed with cartouche "Beloved of Nekheb". 19th Dynasty. From El-Kab, Egypt. Petrie Museum, London

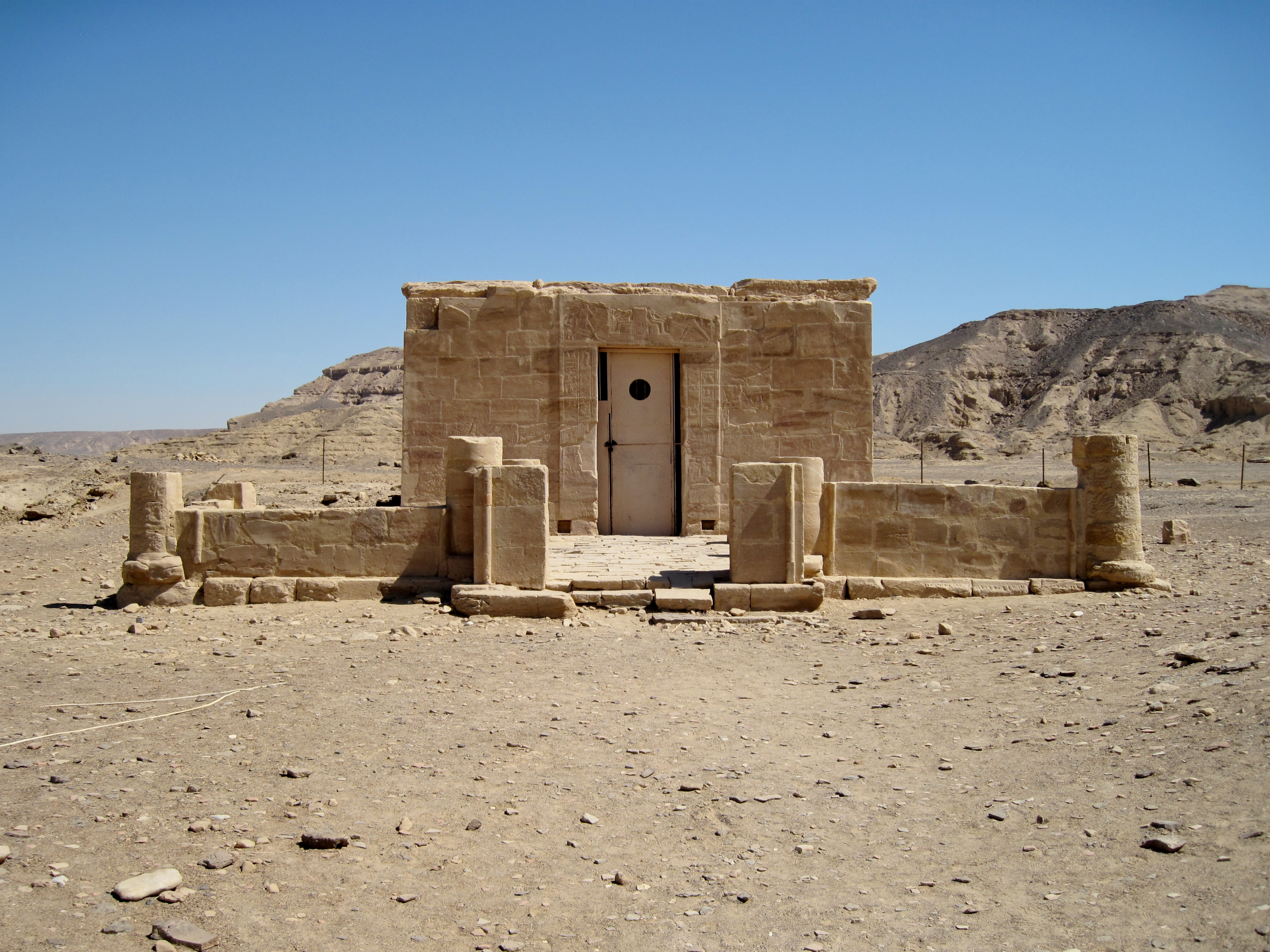
Exterior view of the Temple of Amenhotep III at El-Kab

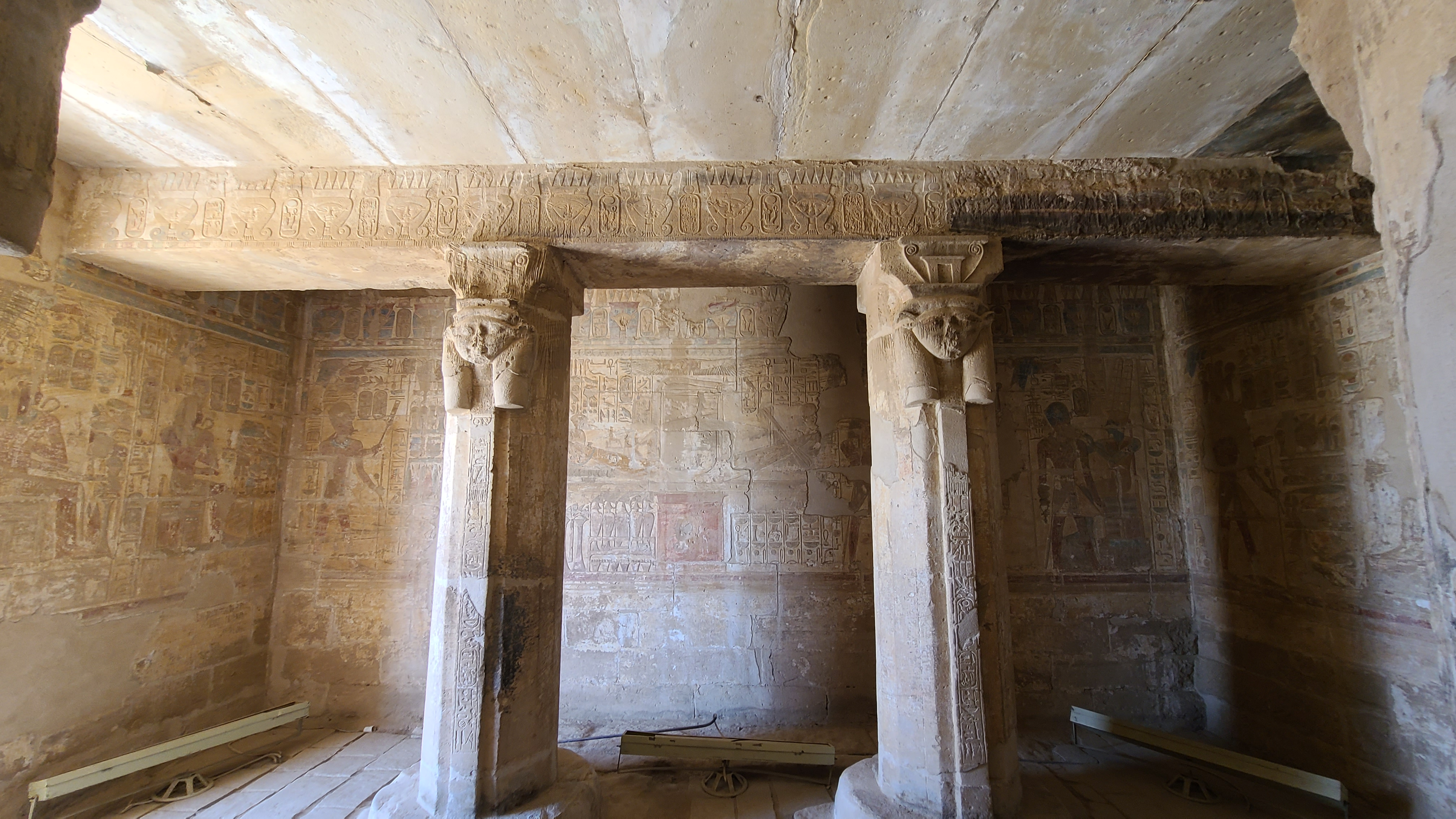
Interior view of the Temple of Amenhotep III at El-Kab

The walled settlement of Nekheb was one of the first urban centres of the Early Dynastic period, and for a short time in the New Kingdom (1550–1069 BC) it eclipsed the city of Nekhen or Hierakonpolis on the opposite bank, becoming the capital of the third nome of Upper Egypt. Its massive mudbrick walls, dating to the Late Period (747–332 BC) and thought to have been built by Nectanebo II as a defensive measure, are still largely preserved. They enclose an area of about 25,000 square metres (270,000 sq ft).

Near the centre of the Nekheb are the remains of sandstone temples dedicated to the ancient Egyptian deities Nekhbet and Thoth that date primarily to the Eighteenth to Thirtieth Dynasties (1550–343 BCE), but the original foundation of the temple of Nekhbet almost certainly dates back to the late fourth millennium BC.

=== Necropolis ===
The necropolis has some important tombs, showing the early history of the Eighteenth Dynasty and the reunification of Egypt. The rock tombs of the provincial governors of Nekheb in the New Kingdom include those of Sobeknakht II an important official whose saved the Theban Sixteenth or Seventeenth Dynasty from near destruction by invading forces from the Kingdom of Kush, Ahmose, son of Ebana, an admiral in the wars of liberation against the Hyksos rulers (c. 1550 BCE), and Setau, a priest during the reign of Ramesses III (1184–1153 BCE). The style of the early Eighteenth Dynasty wall paintings anticipates that of the first New Kingdom nobles' tombs at Thebes.

== Ptolemaic and Roman eras ==
During the Greco-Roman period, the town flourished and became known as Eileithyias polis (Greek: Ειλείθυιας πόλις, Latin: Lucinae Civitas). This village may have thrived for a little while, but it seems that in 380, the city was demolished, either from military or political events. All that remains of the actual buildings are the lower parts of the walls of the houses, but luckily many of the artifacts that would have been inside the houses remained. Coins from the first to fourth century were recovered along with Demotic Greek and ostraca.

== Walls ==
One of the discoveries at the site that Quibell questioned the most during his dig was the walls that surrounded the serdab. However, much more research has been done since then, and according to a journal article published by the "British Museum of Ancient Egypt and Sudan", the walls date to about the 30th Dynasty, or about the 4th century BC. In 1921, an article titled "El-Kab and the Great Wall" was published in "The Journal of Egyptian Archaeology", and it explained further the three different sets of walls and what they were used for. The first set of walls (the word set being used to describe a double range of walls) "encloses part of the ancient town, second a double range [encloses] the temple group, and lastly, most conspicuous of the three, the great and massive wall [cuts] across the site of the ancient town." This last wall mentioned surrounds a plot of land that had never actually been inhabited. After some time, because the movement of the Nile River towards the city had threatened to destroy the construction, the original wall around the city could no longer be useful.

The Egyptians had to construct a new wall, farther from the Nile, so that the people could continue to build their houses and live in an area safe from destruction. James Breasted also mentions these walls in an account he wrote of the site in 1897. In his article he states with admiration that, "it is the only city of remote antiquity the walls of which still stand almost intact. From the cliffs back of the town one may look down upon it, stretched out beneath one's feet, and almost see the majestic temple, surrounded by the beautiful villas of the feudal lords, whose soldiery once manned the now silent walls." He then goes on to describe these walls as sun baked brick that are laid thirty-eight feet thick, and surround an enclosure two thousand feet long and fifteen hundred feet wide.

== Ancient campsites ==
In 1967 Pierre Vermeersch discovered a series of well-stratified Epipaleolithic campsites. Radiocarbon-dated to c.6400-5980 BC, these are the type-sites of the Elkabian microlithic industry, filling a gap in the prehistoric cultural sequence of Egypt between the Upper Paleolithic (c. 10,000 BC) and the earliest Neolithic (c. 5500 BC).

== Ancient texts ==
Since the 1980s, even more discoveries have been made. The surrounding hills are inscribed with petroglyphs that range in time period, from Predynastic to Islamic times, not to mention hieroglyphics that also vary in date (but for the most part were written during the 6th dynasty). At first, many thought these inscriptions to be similar to modern day graffiti – random phrases written by passerby and travelers. However, once further studied, it was realized that these phrases are actually short texts that mention the inhabitants of the town. This is very interesting, because it tells us that Egyptians took note of who lived in what villages, or at least who lived in Elkab. Of course, these inscriptions are only dated from the Sixth Dynasty, but it still tells us a little bit about what they valued.

== See also ==
- List of ancient Egyptian sites

== Bibliography ==
- Comité des Fouilles Belges en Égypte (ed.), Elkab, 8 vols (Brussels and Louvain, 1971-2010).
- J.E Quibell, El-Kab (London, 1898).
- El Kab at Project Gutenberg by James E. Quibell (1898 account of archeological expedition)
- P. Vermeersch, 'L'Elkabien. Une nouvelle industrie epipaleolithique an Elkab en Haute Egypte, sa stratigraphic, sa typologie'. CdE 45 (1970), 45-68.
- Ian Shaw and Paul Nicholson, The Dictionary of Ancient Egypt, 92-3.
