= Khepresh =

Egyptian royal headdress

- Khepresh, the blue crown of Egypt

Details
- Country: Ancient Egypt

The khepresh (ḫprš) was an ancient Egyptian royal headdress. It is also known as the blue crown or war crown. New Kingdom pharaohs are often depicted wearing it in battle, but it was also frequently worn in ceremonies. While it was once called the war crown by many, modern historians refrain from characterizing it thus.

No original example of a khepresh has yet been found. Based on ancient artistic representations, some Egyptologists have speculated that the khepresh was made of leather or stiffened cloth covered with a precise arrangement of hundreds of sequins, discs, bosses, or rings. Given that the deshret (red crown) and hedjet (white crown) were apparently woven of some sort of plant fiber, the circles or rings decorating ancient artistic representations of the khepresh may instead indicate the regular array of hexagonal holes in an open triaxial weave. As with many other royal crowns, a uraeus (cobra) was hooked to the front of the khepresh.

== History ==
S7
Blue Crown
"War Crown"
in hieroglyphs

The Blue Crown, or War Crown, was represented in hieroglyphs.

=== Second Intermediate Period ===
A modern drawing of a pharaoh with a blue crown

The earliest known mention of the khepresh is on the stela Cairo JE 59635 [CG 20799] which dates to the reign of pharaoh Neferhotep III, during the Second Intermediate Period. In this and other examples from the same era, the word is written with a determinative that represents the cap crown, a lower and less elaborate type of crown.

The earliest known depiction of the khepresh is on the stela Cairo CG 20517 which dates to the reign of Snaaib, during the Second Intermediate Period. The stela shows him wearing the Khepresh crown and adoring the god Min

=== New Kingdom ===
During the New Kingdom, pharaohs were shown with this crown in military circumstances. However, some scholars think that the crown was also meant to evoke the divine power of the pharaoh, and was thereby worn to religiously situate kings as manifestations of gods on earth.

Images of the khepresh from the reign of Ahmose I, first king of the Eighteenth Dynasty, show a headdress that is taller than the cap crown and more angular than later forms of the khepresh. This crown continued to evolve during the early Eighteenth Dynasty, attaining its best-known form in the reigns of Hatshepsut and Thutmose III. After Amenhotep III's reign – and particularly during the 18th and 19th Dynasties – it came into fashion and was even adopted by some pharaohs as a primary crown.

=== After the New Kingdom ===
The crown was not seen depicted in the Kushite Dynasty (747 to 656 BCE). However, depictions of the crowns returned in the Twenty-sixth Dynasty of Egypt (664 to 525 BCE). Some of the Ptolemaic and early Roman pharaohs are also depicted wearing it, with the last depiction being from the reign of Trajan.

== Gallery ==
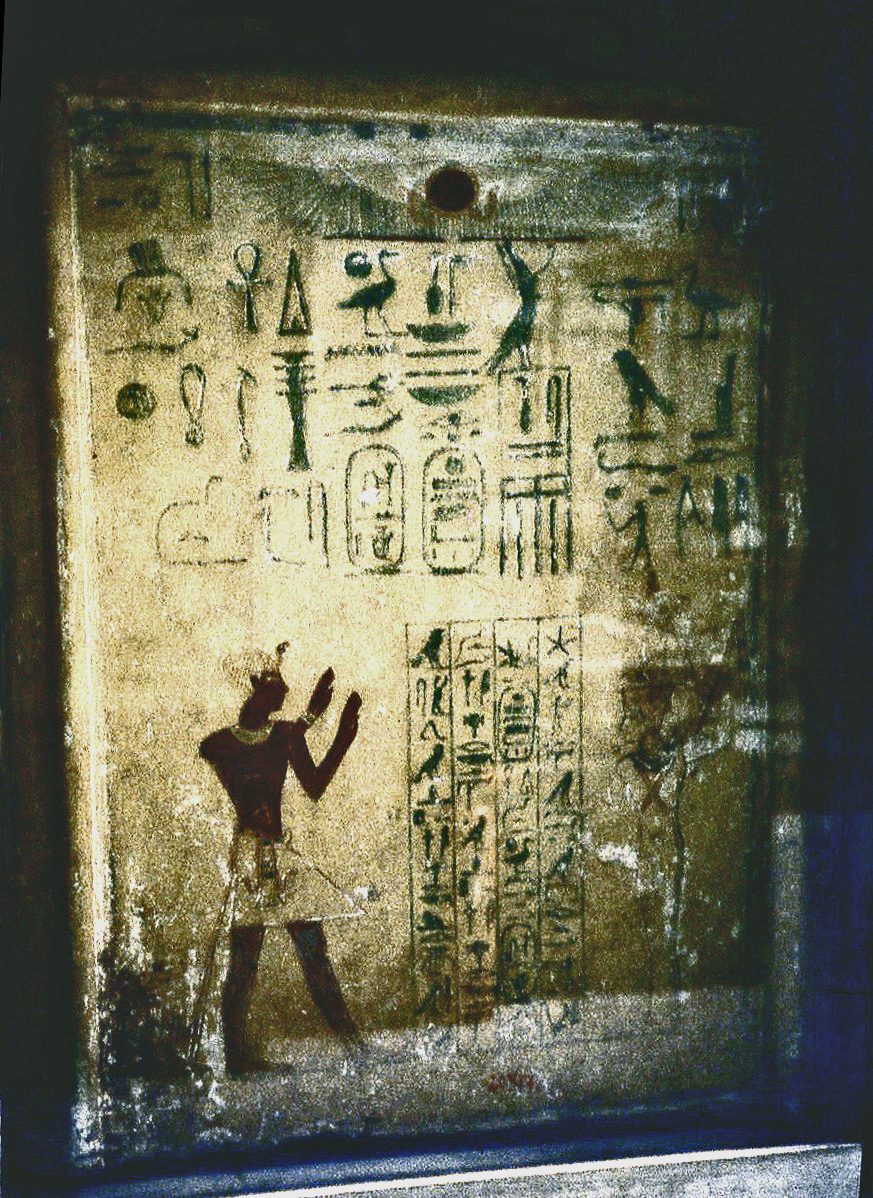
Snaaib

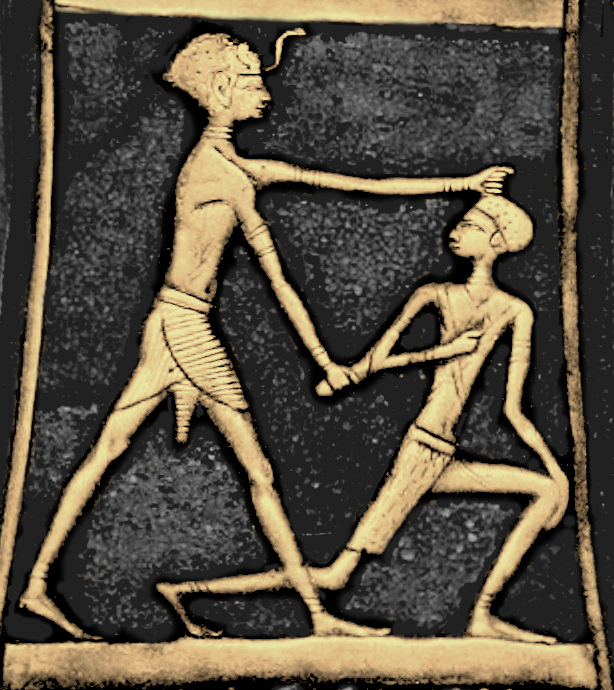
Ahmose I

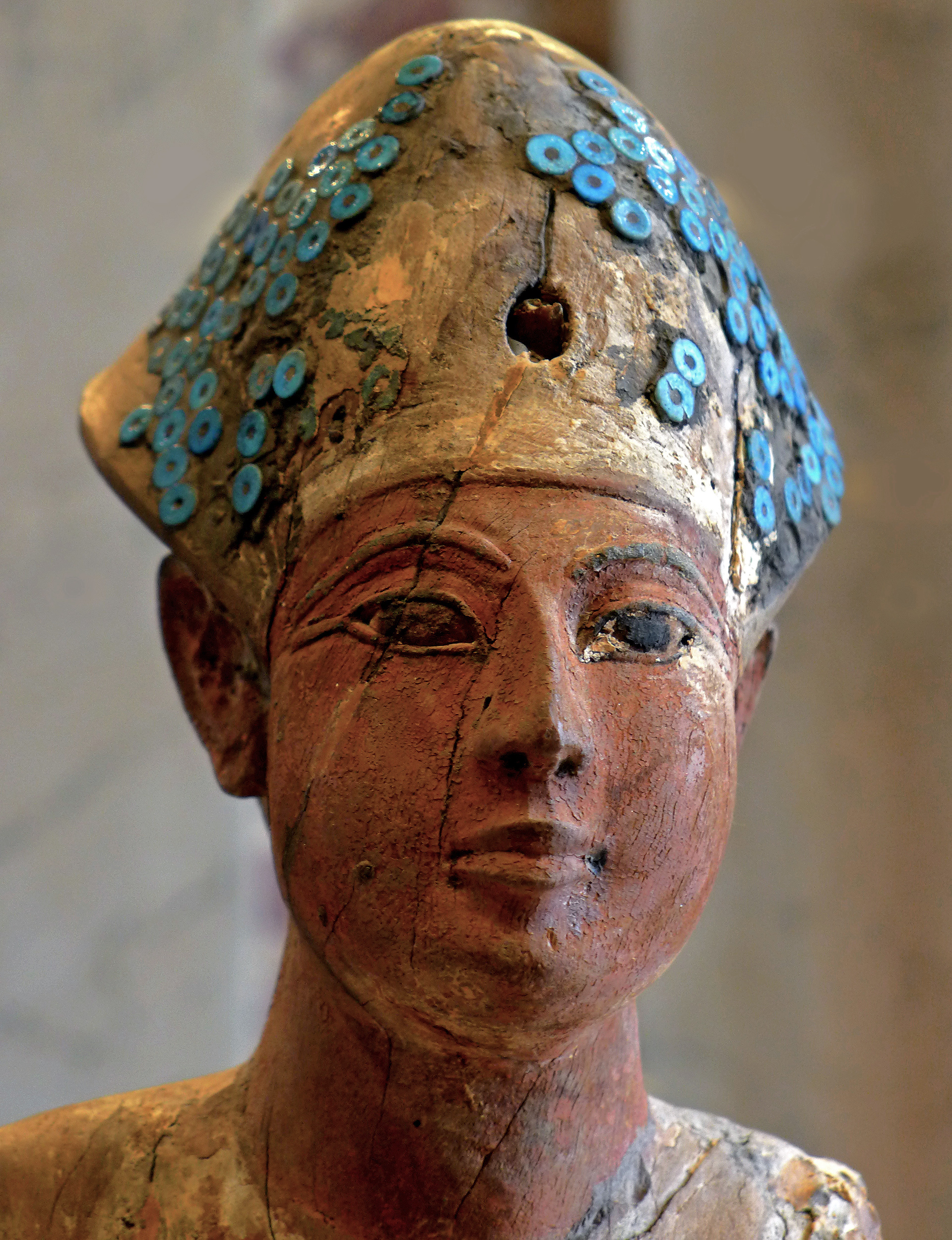
Amenhotep I

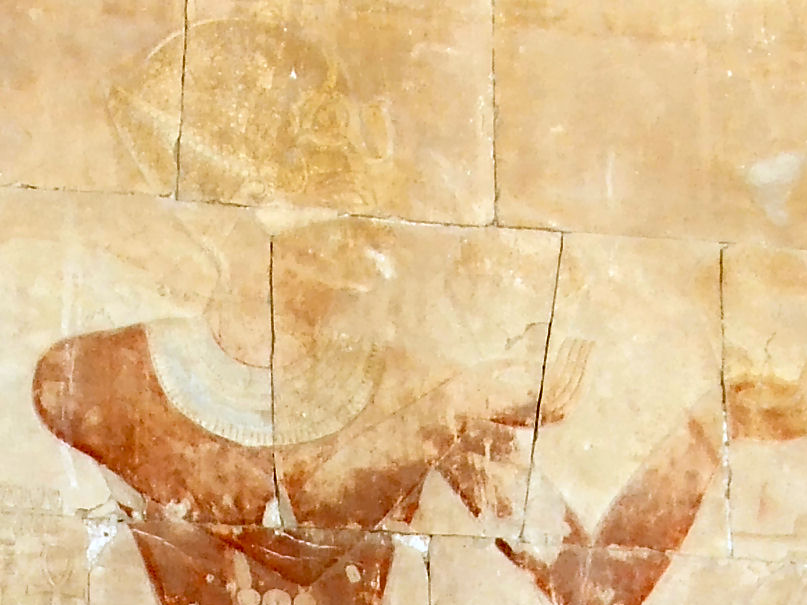
Hatshepsut

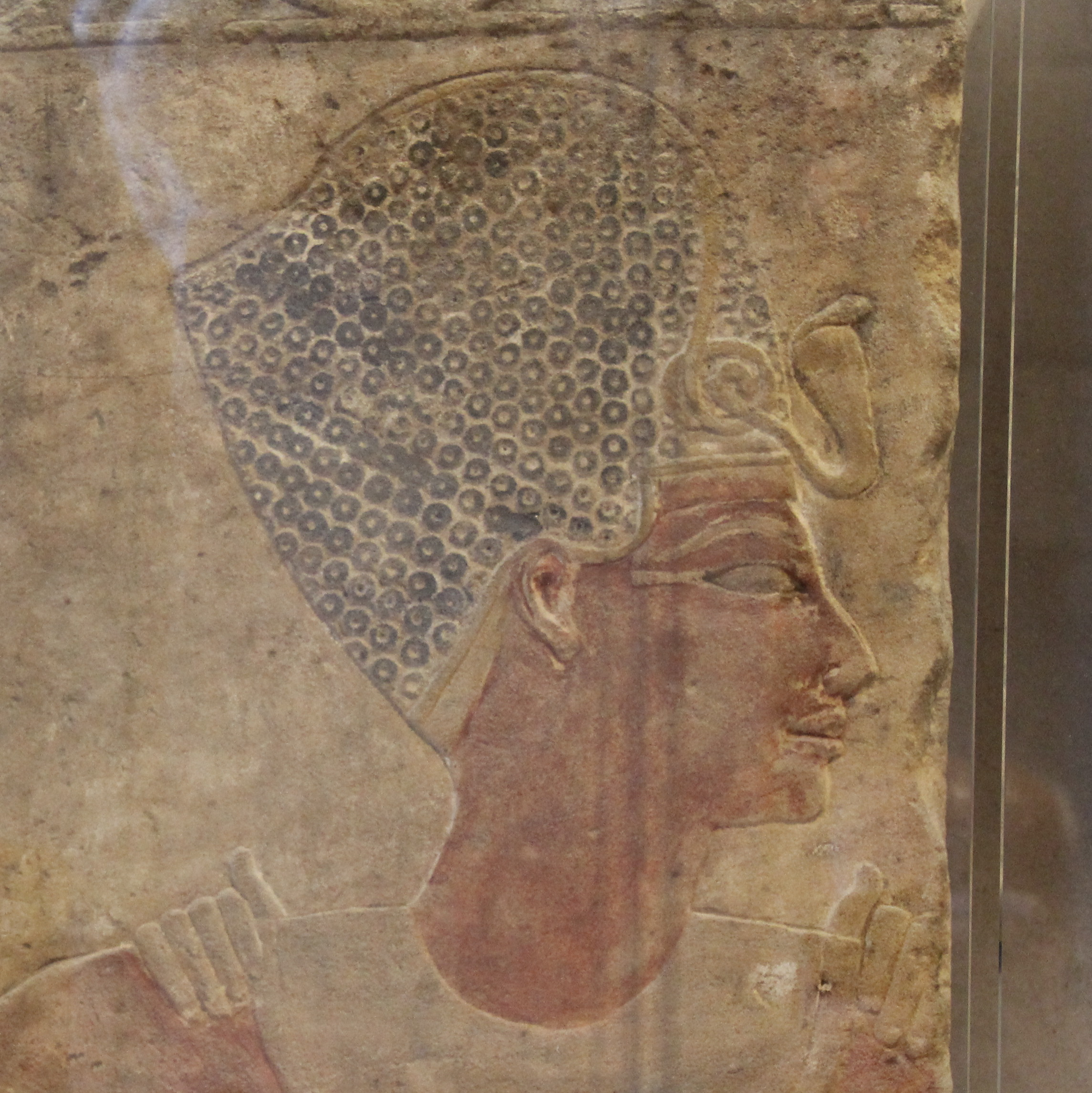
Thutmose III

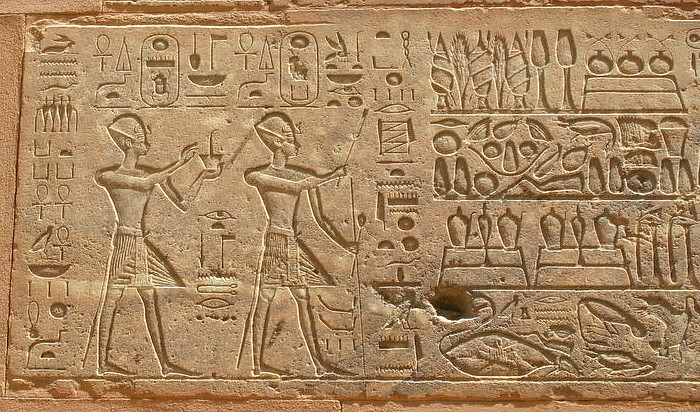
Relief from the Red Chapel showing Thutmose III behind Hatshepsut while both are wearing the Khepresh and making offering to the gods.

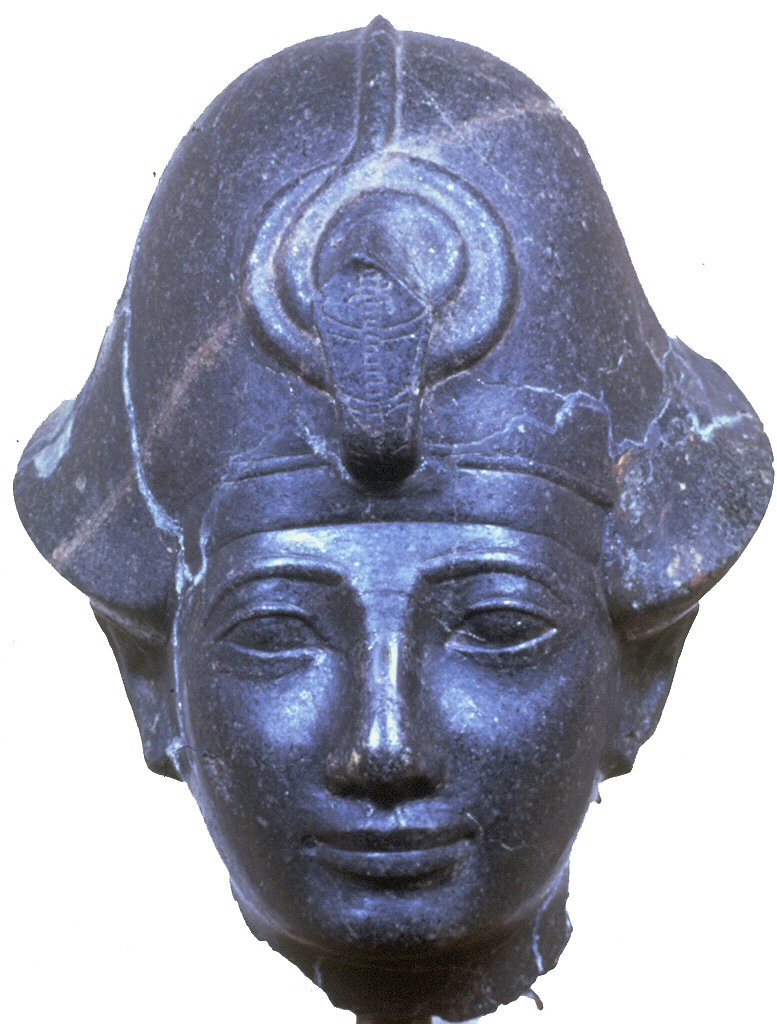
Amenhotep II

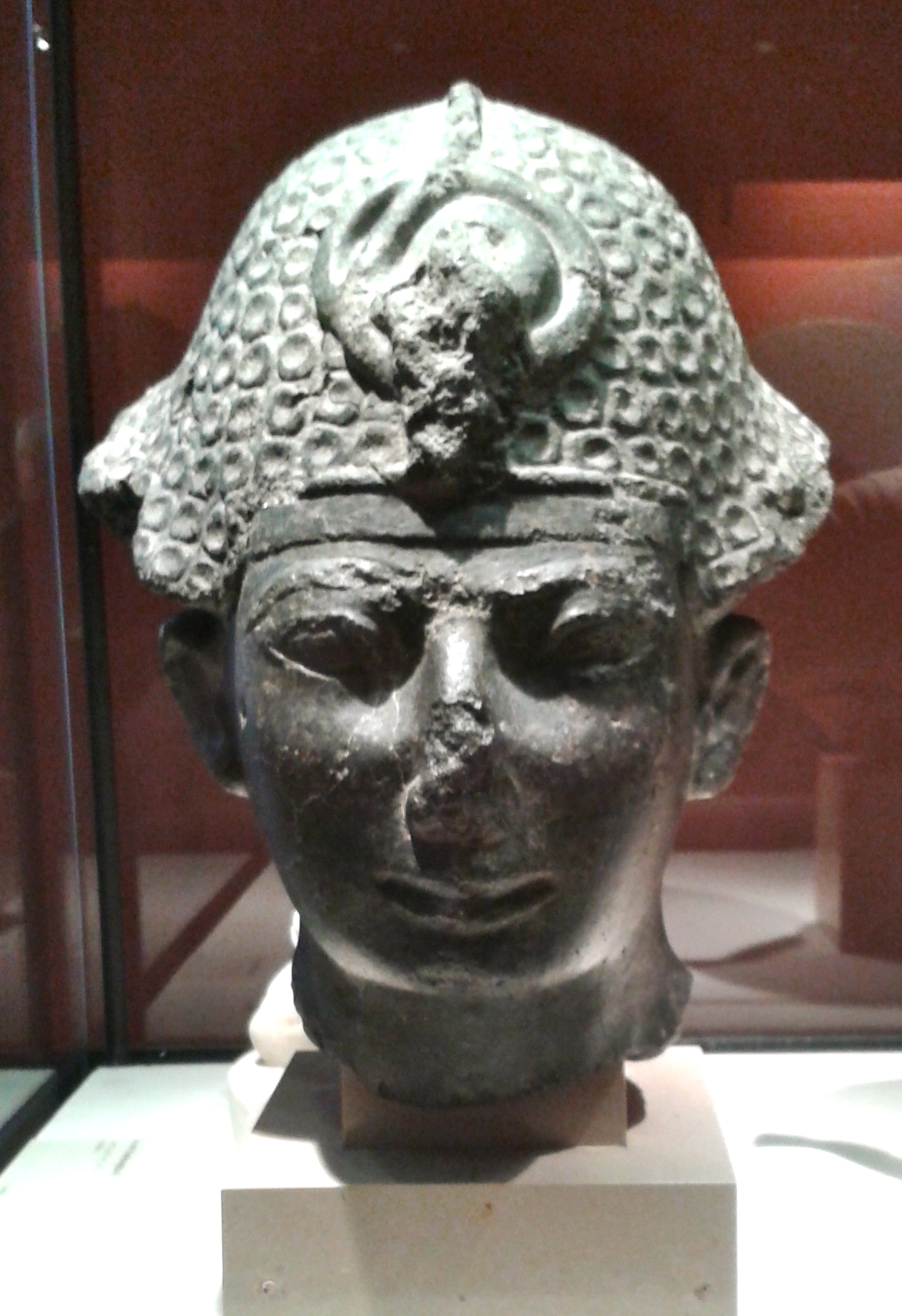
Thutmose IV

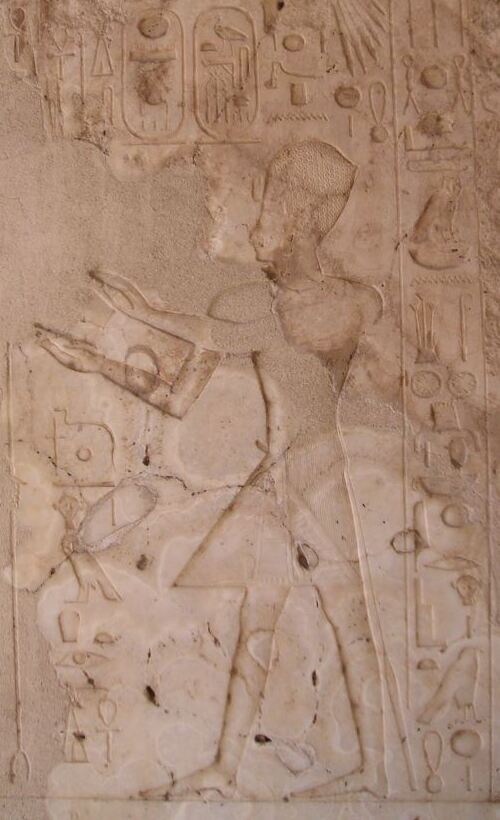
Relief from the Barque Chapel of Thutmosis IV showing Thutmose IV wearing the Khepresh and making offering to the gods.

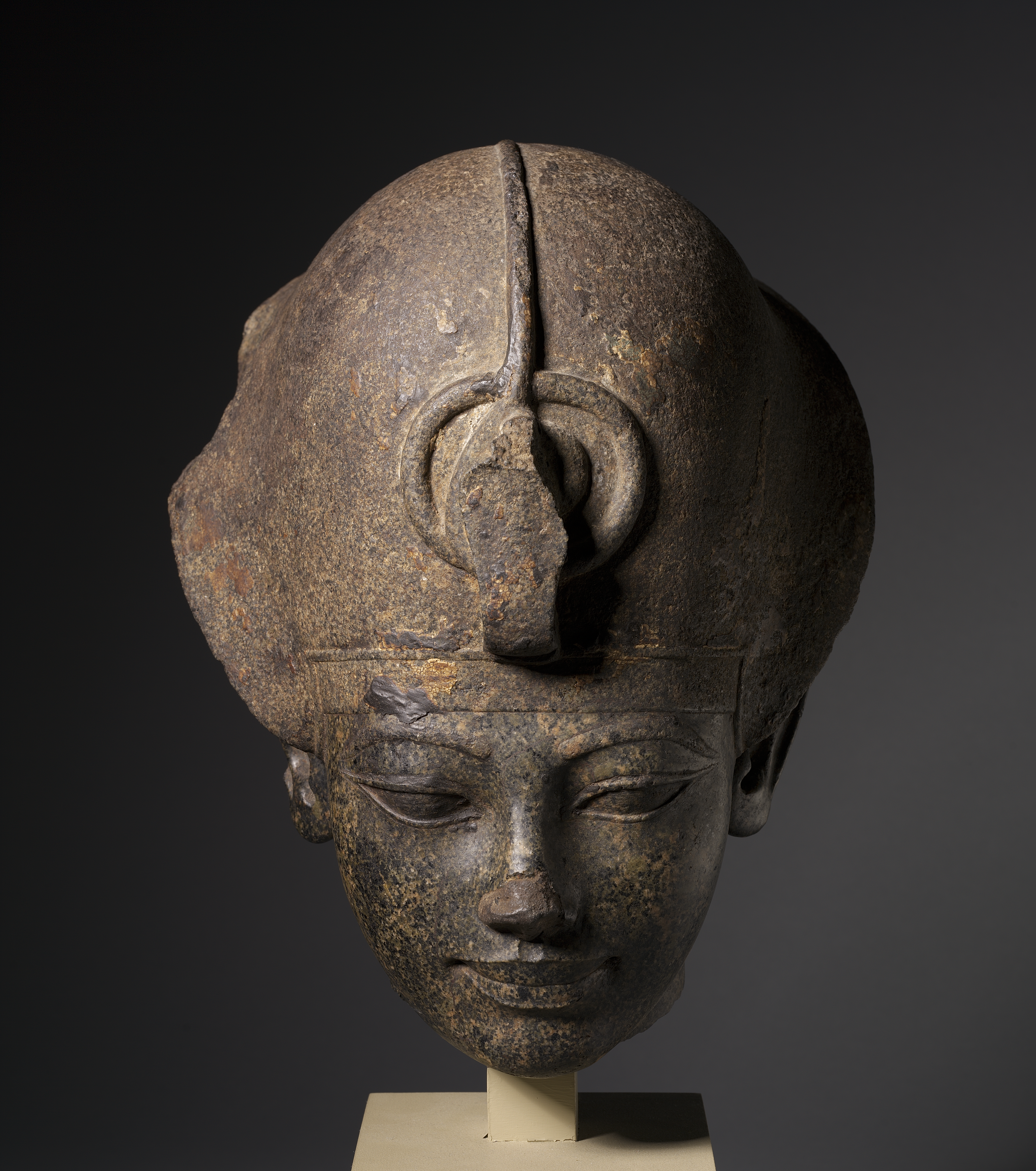
Amenhotep III

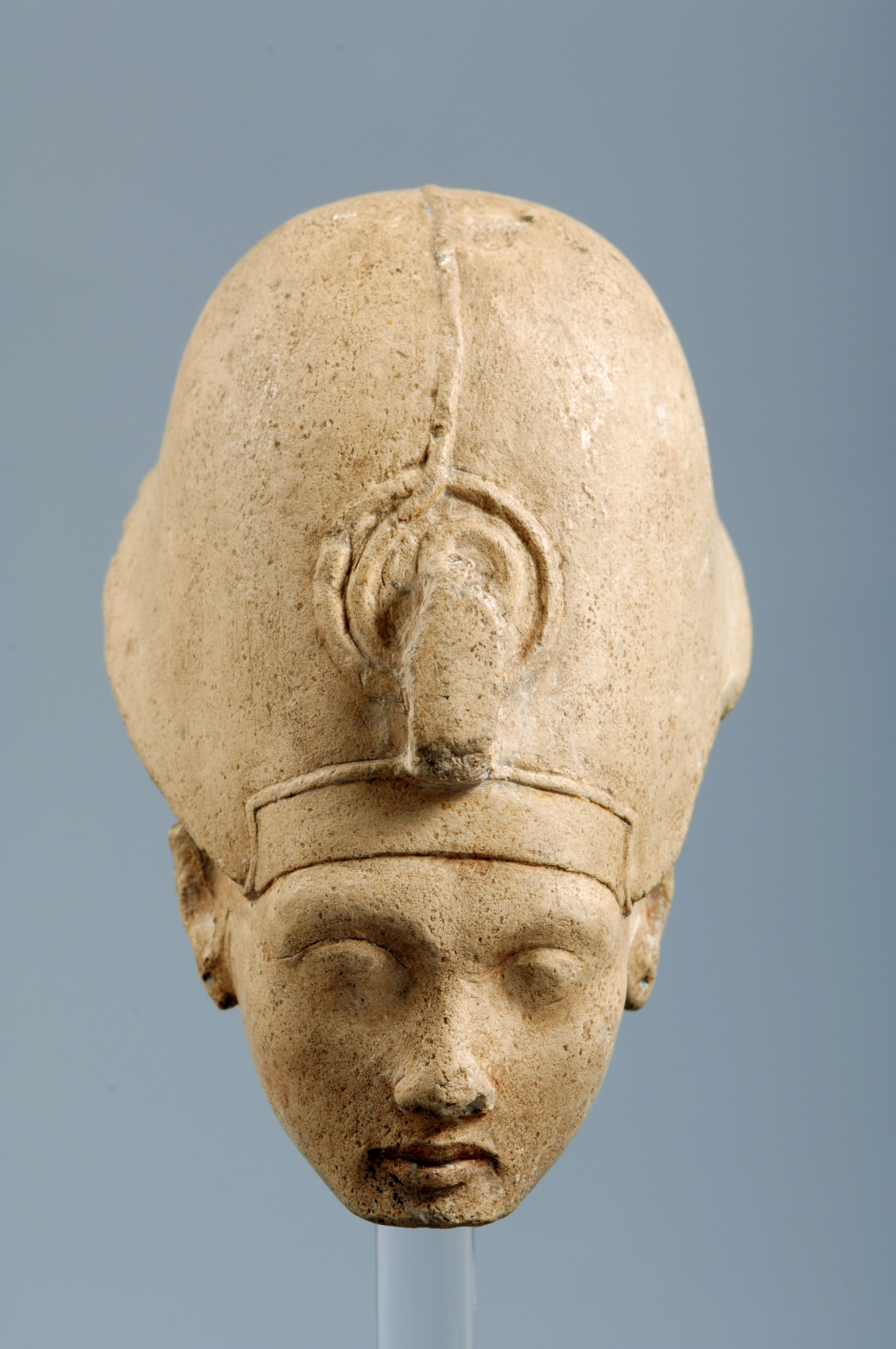
Akhenaten

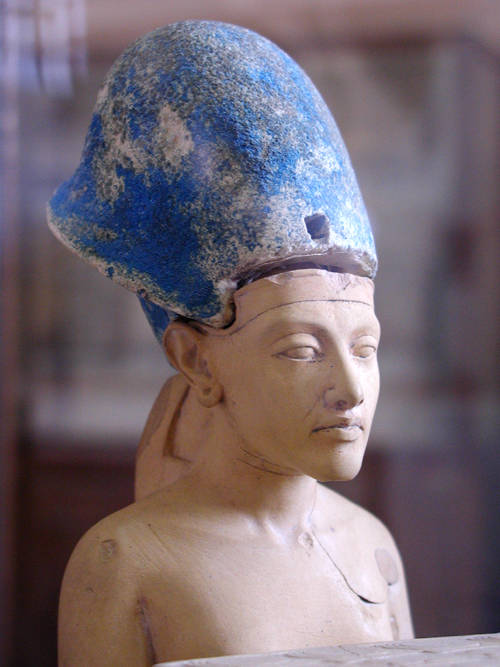
Akhenaten with blue paint on the khepresh crown

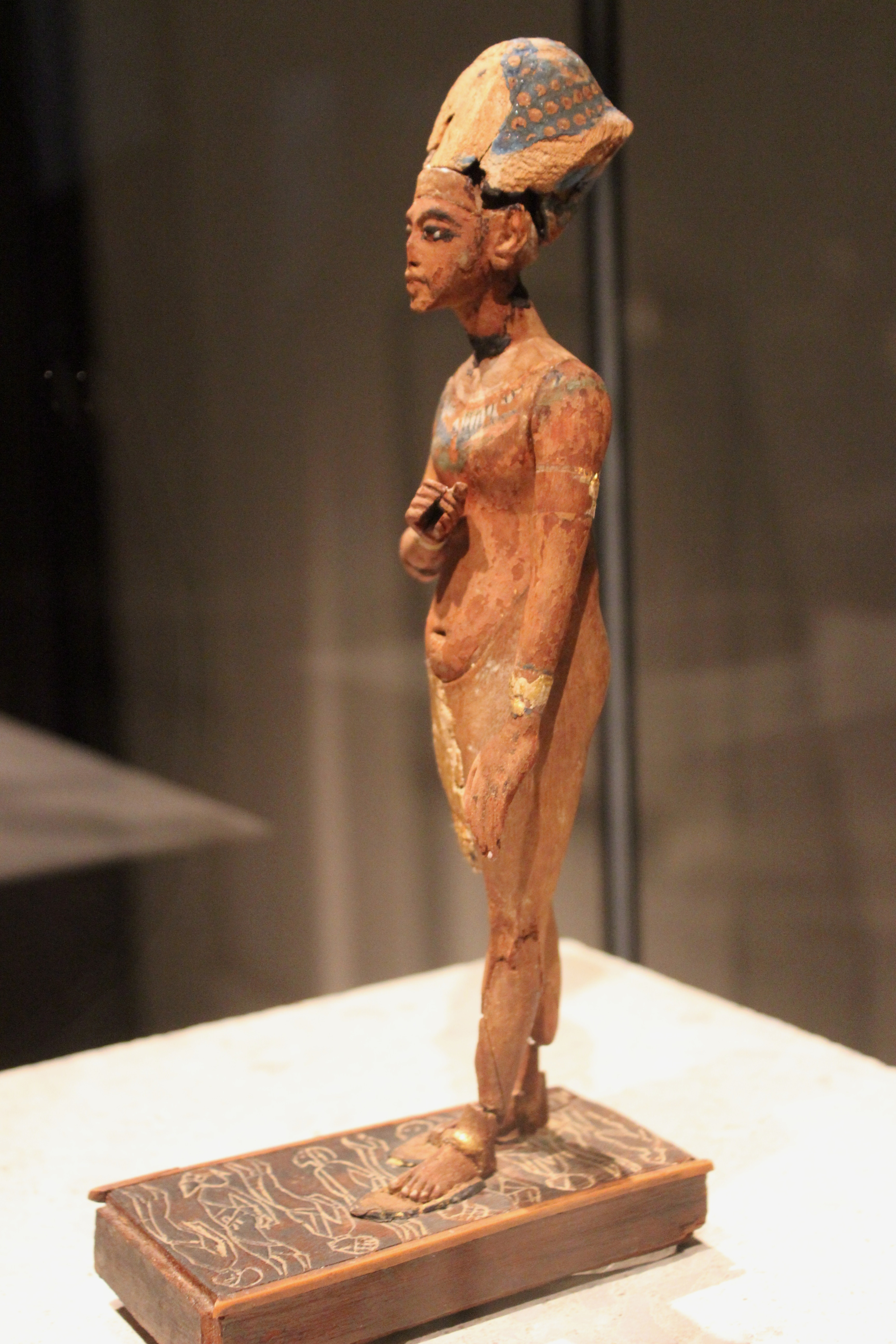
Wooden standing statue of Akhenaten. Currently in the Egyptian Museum of Berlin.

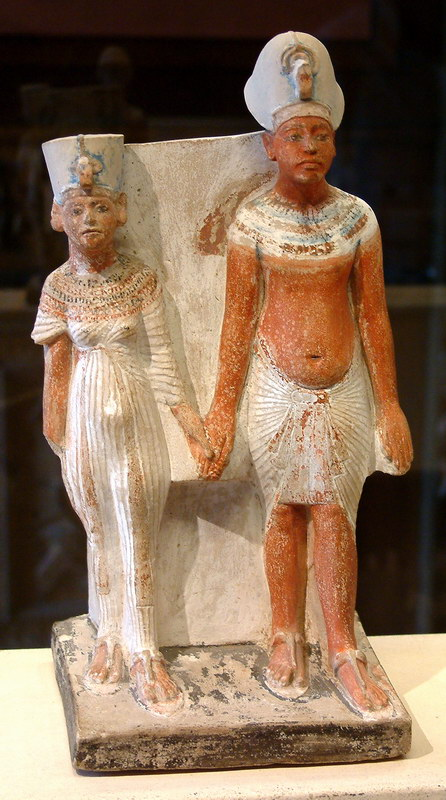
Akhenaten and Nefertiti statuette

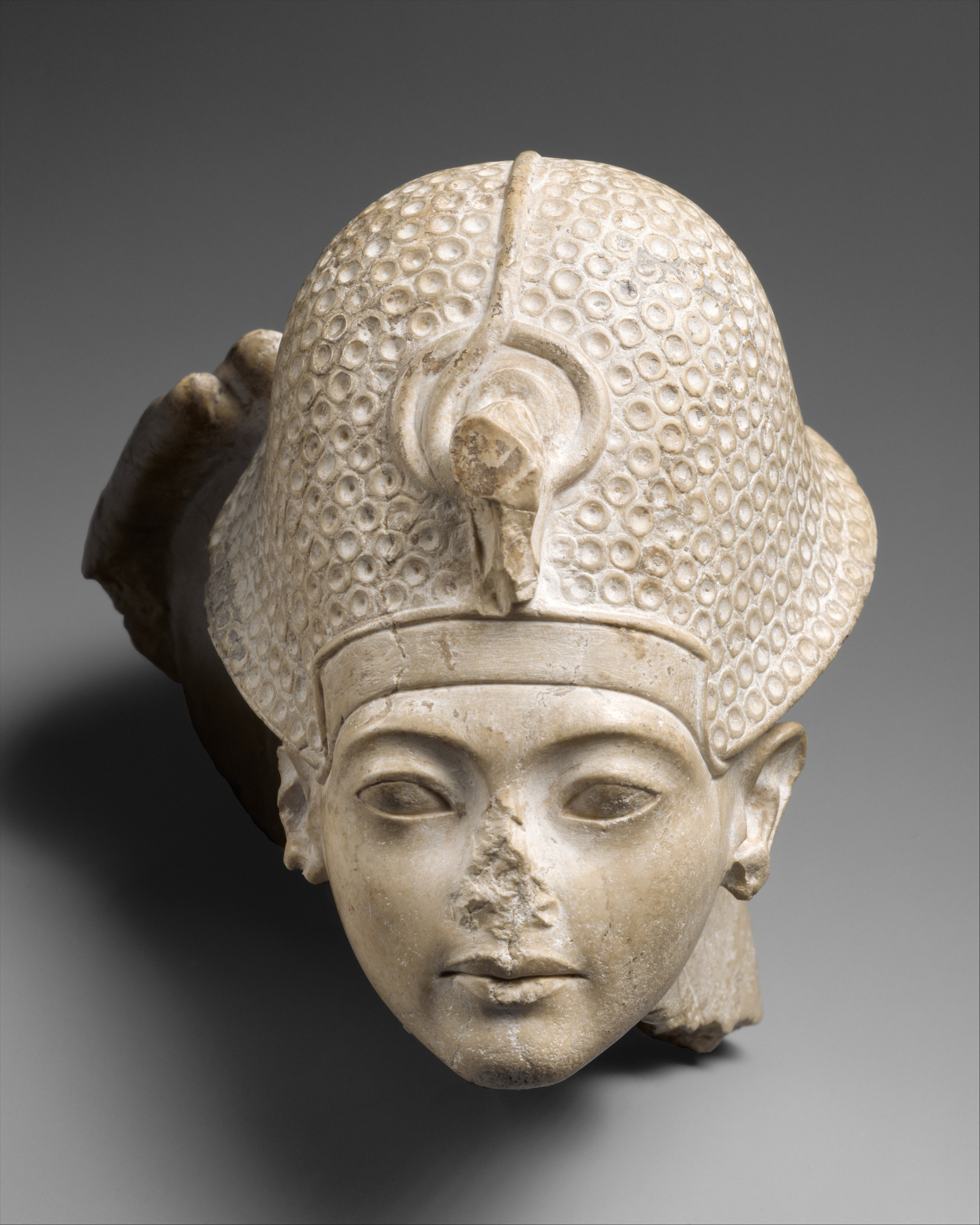
Tutankhamun

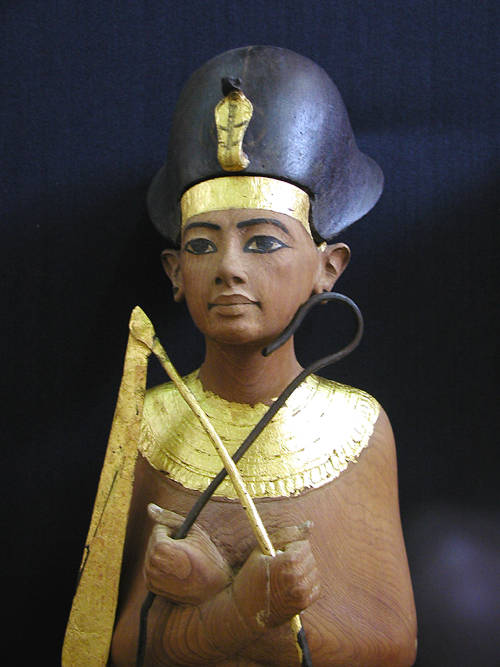
Tutankhamun ushabti

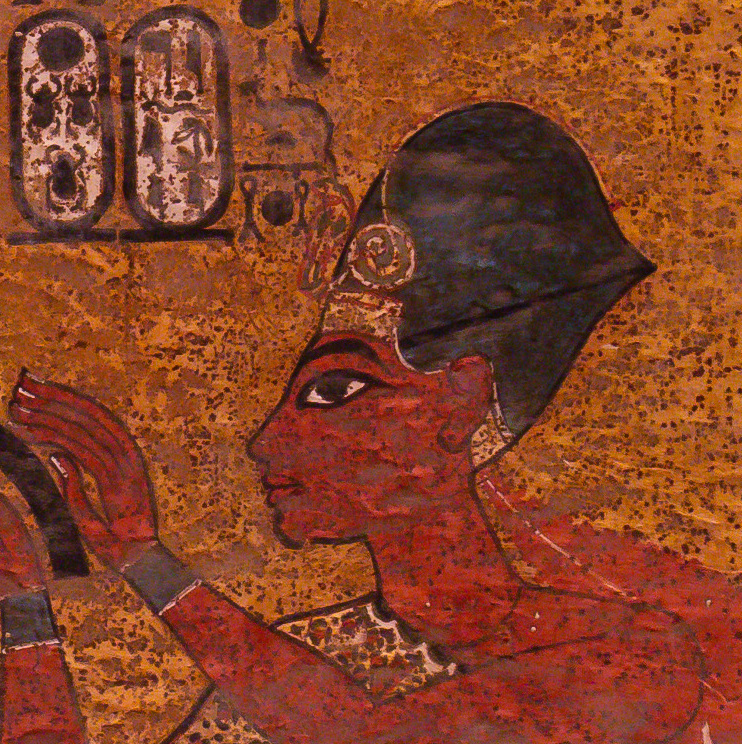
Ay

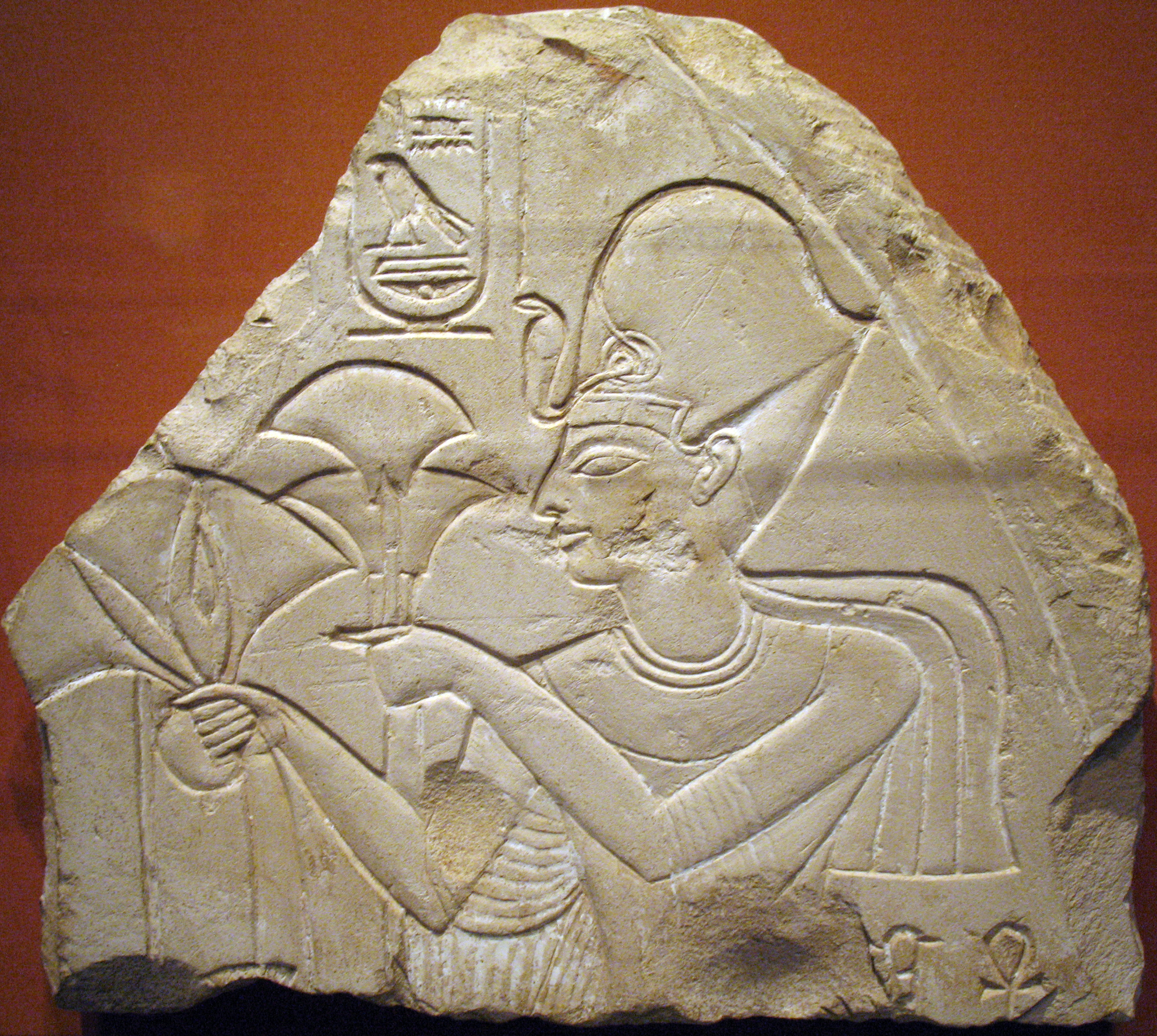
Horemheb

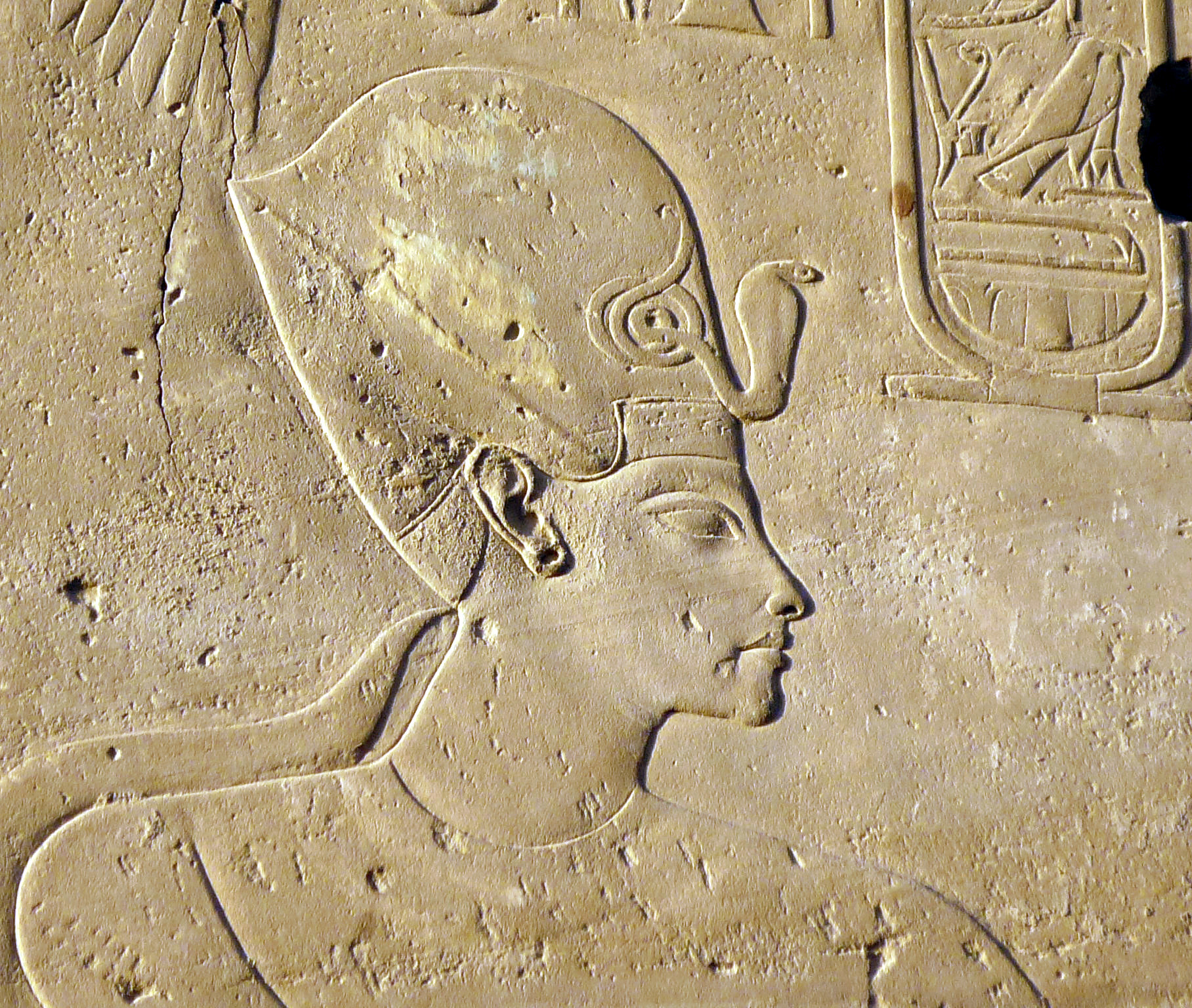
Horemheb relief

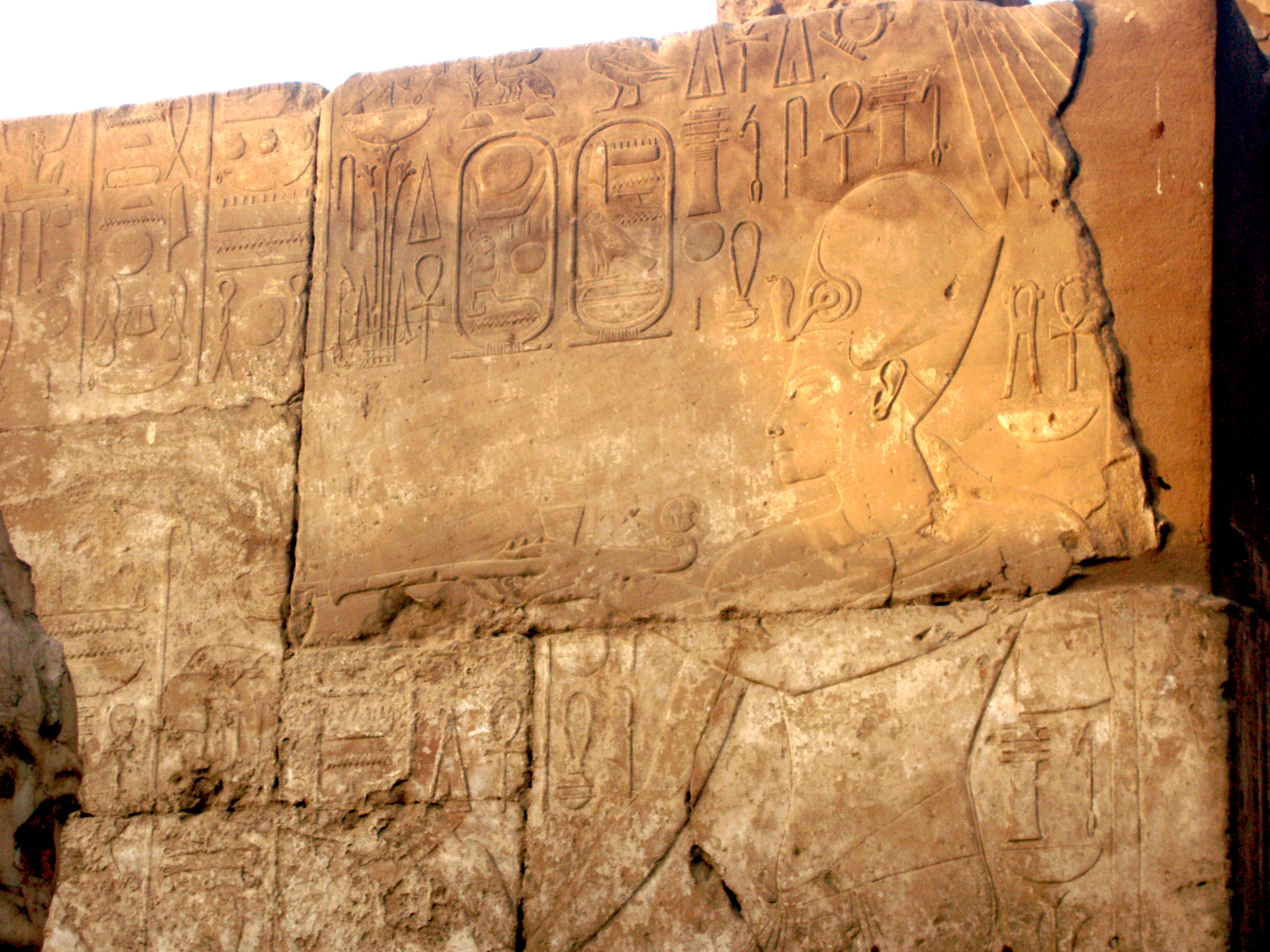
This relief shows Tutankhamun (usurped by Horemheb) wearing the khepresh crown. Luxor Temple.

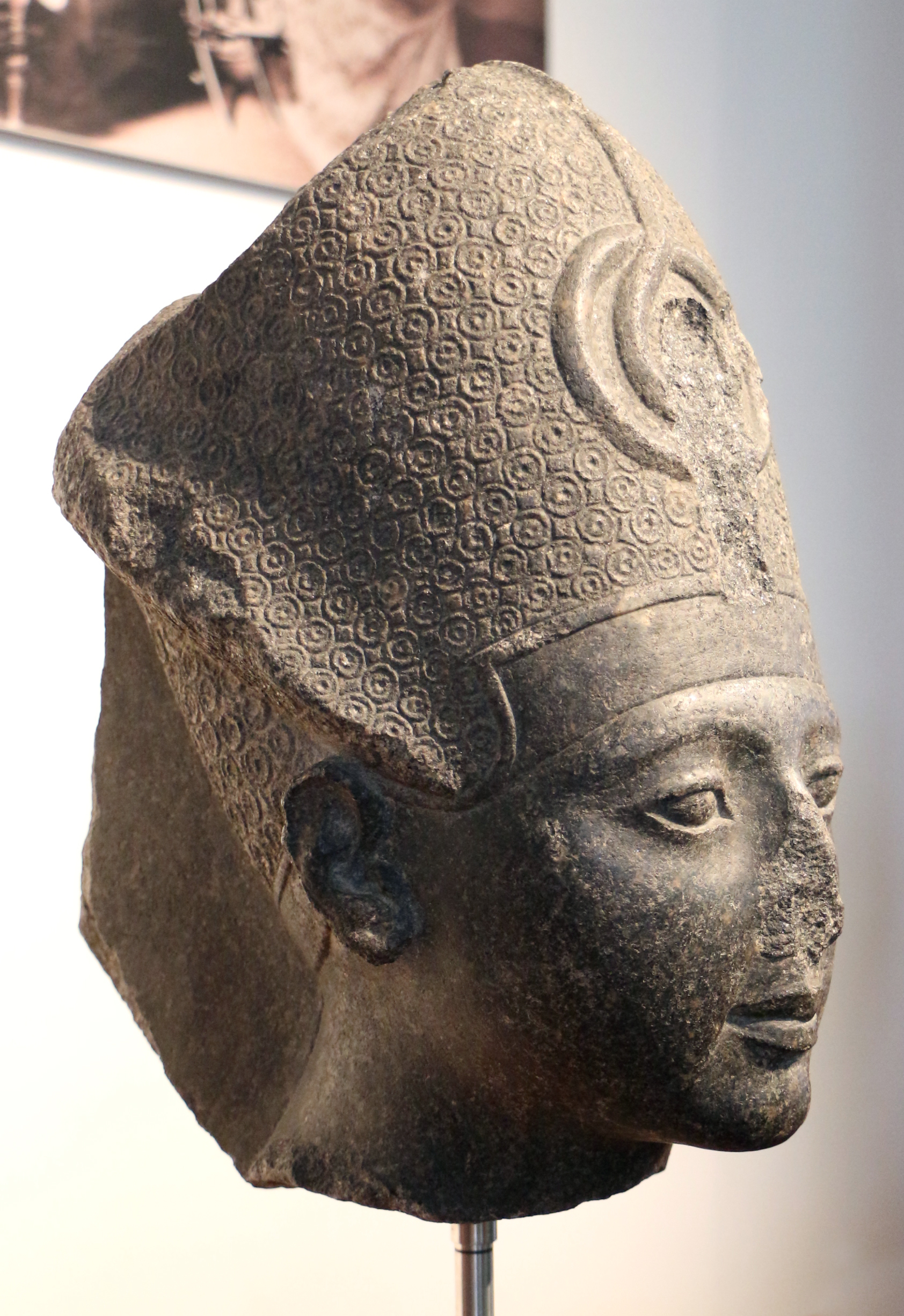
Seti I

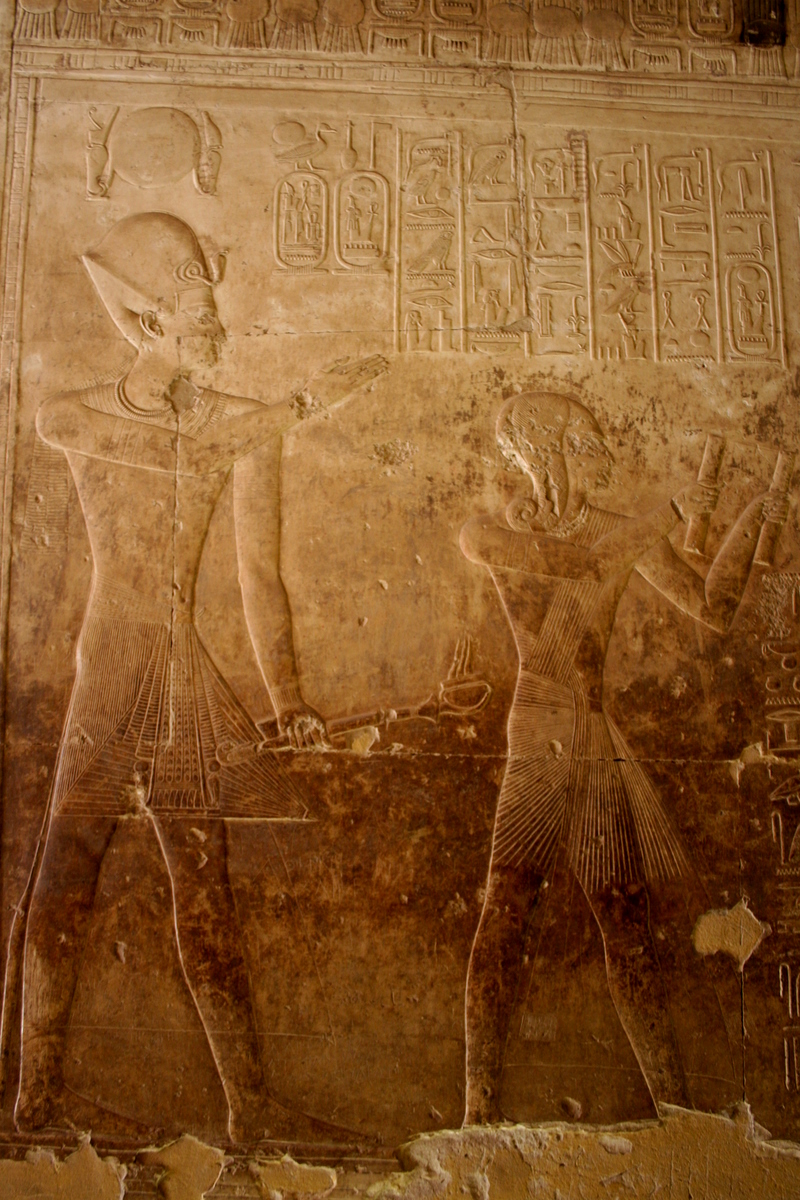
Relief of the Abydos King List showing Seti I and his son Ramesses II on the way to make an offering. Seti is seen wearing the Khepresh while Ramesses is depicted as a prince holding censers.

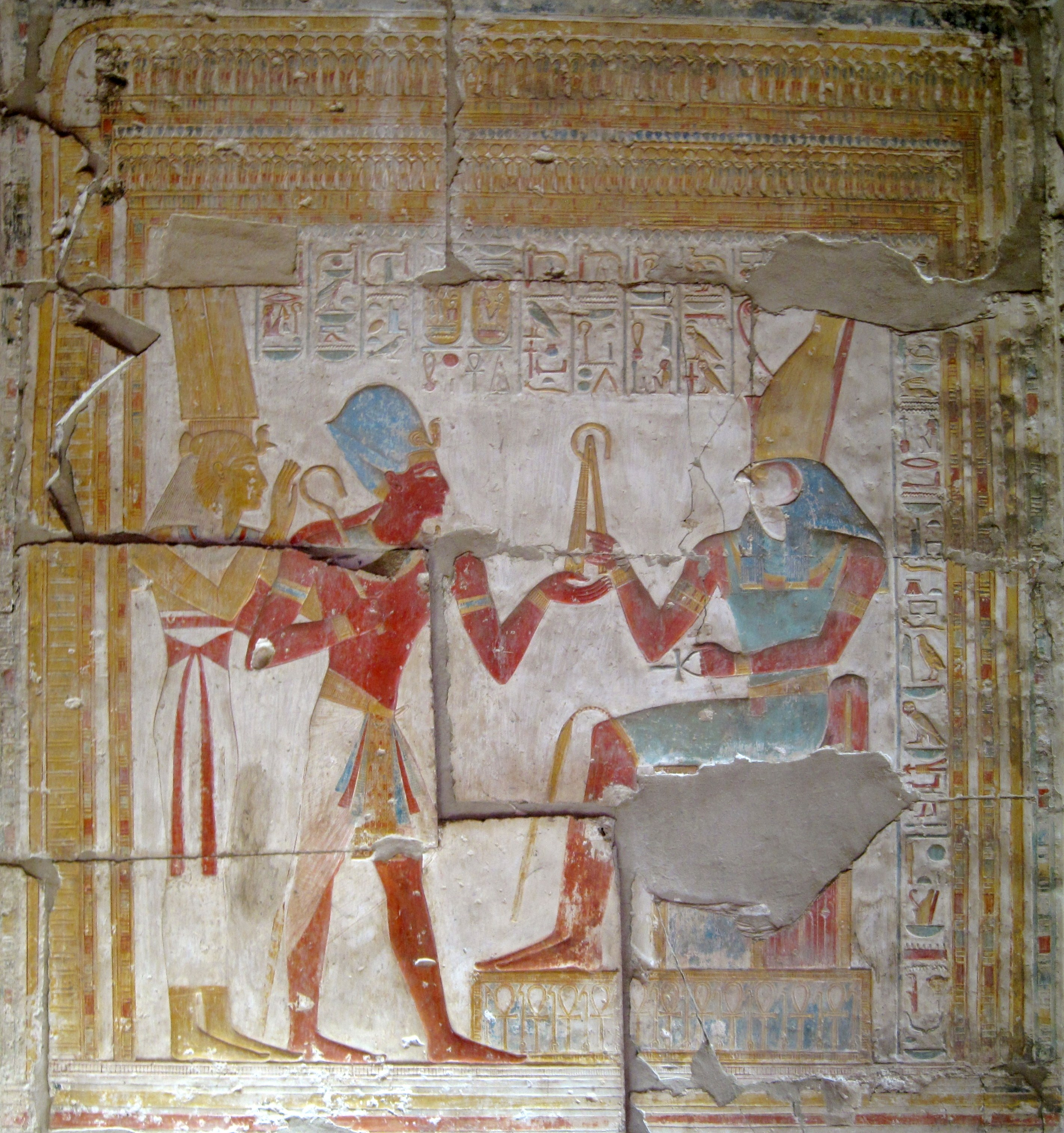
Relief in the temple of Seti I of Seti I wearing the Khepresh while presenting an offering to Horus

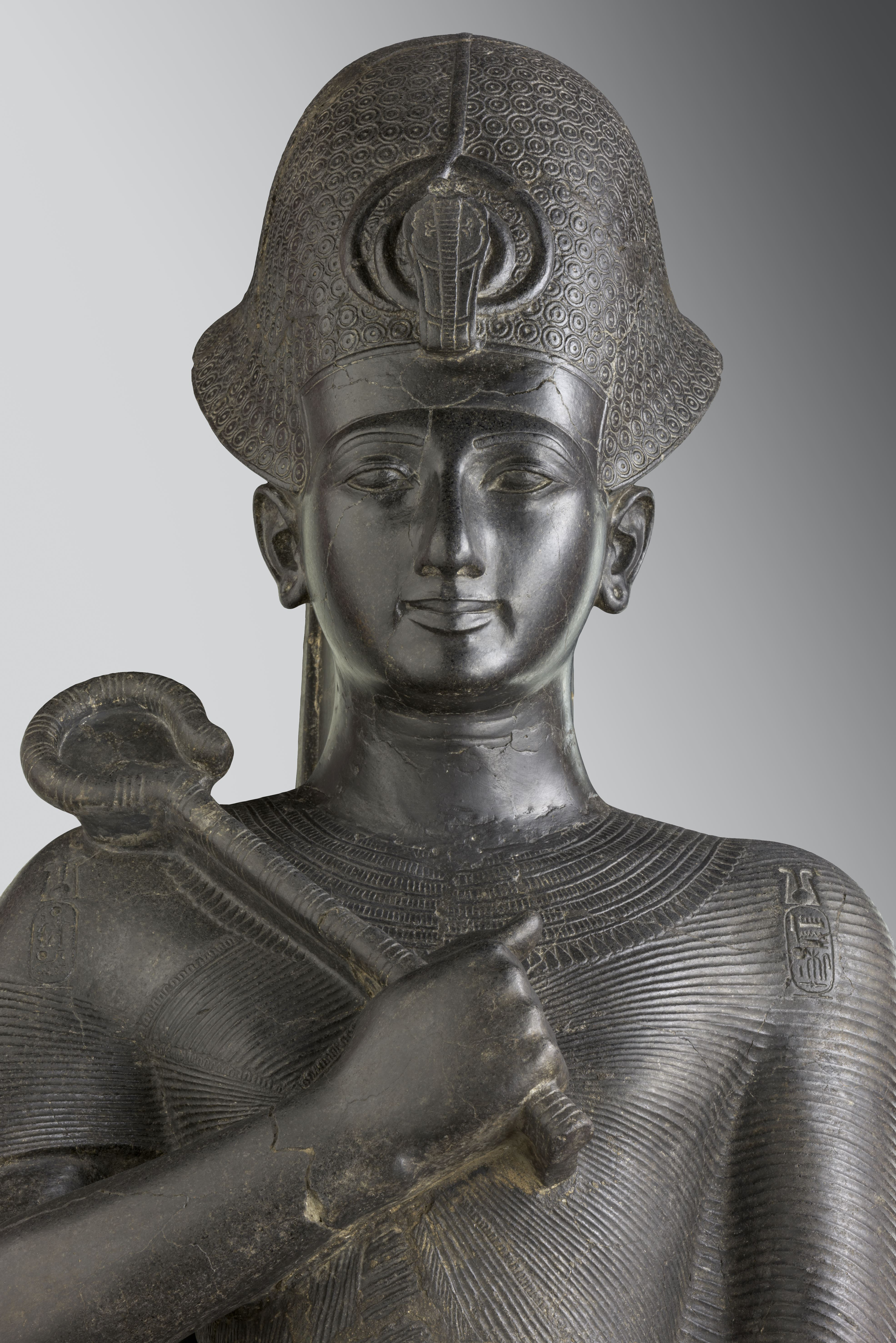
Ramesses II

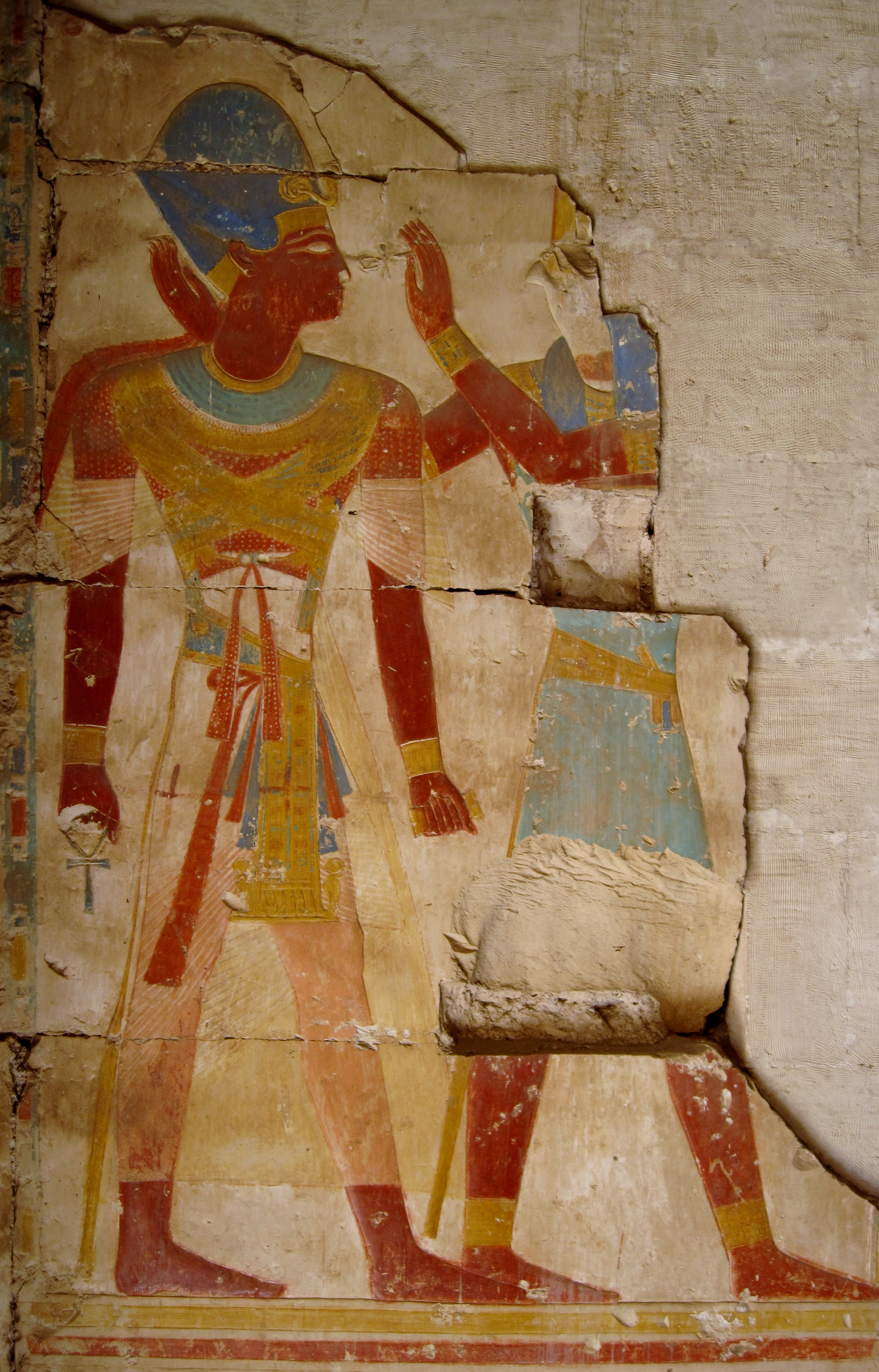
Fragment of a painted relief of Ramesses II wearing the Khepresh while being accompanied by Horus

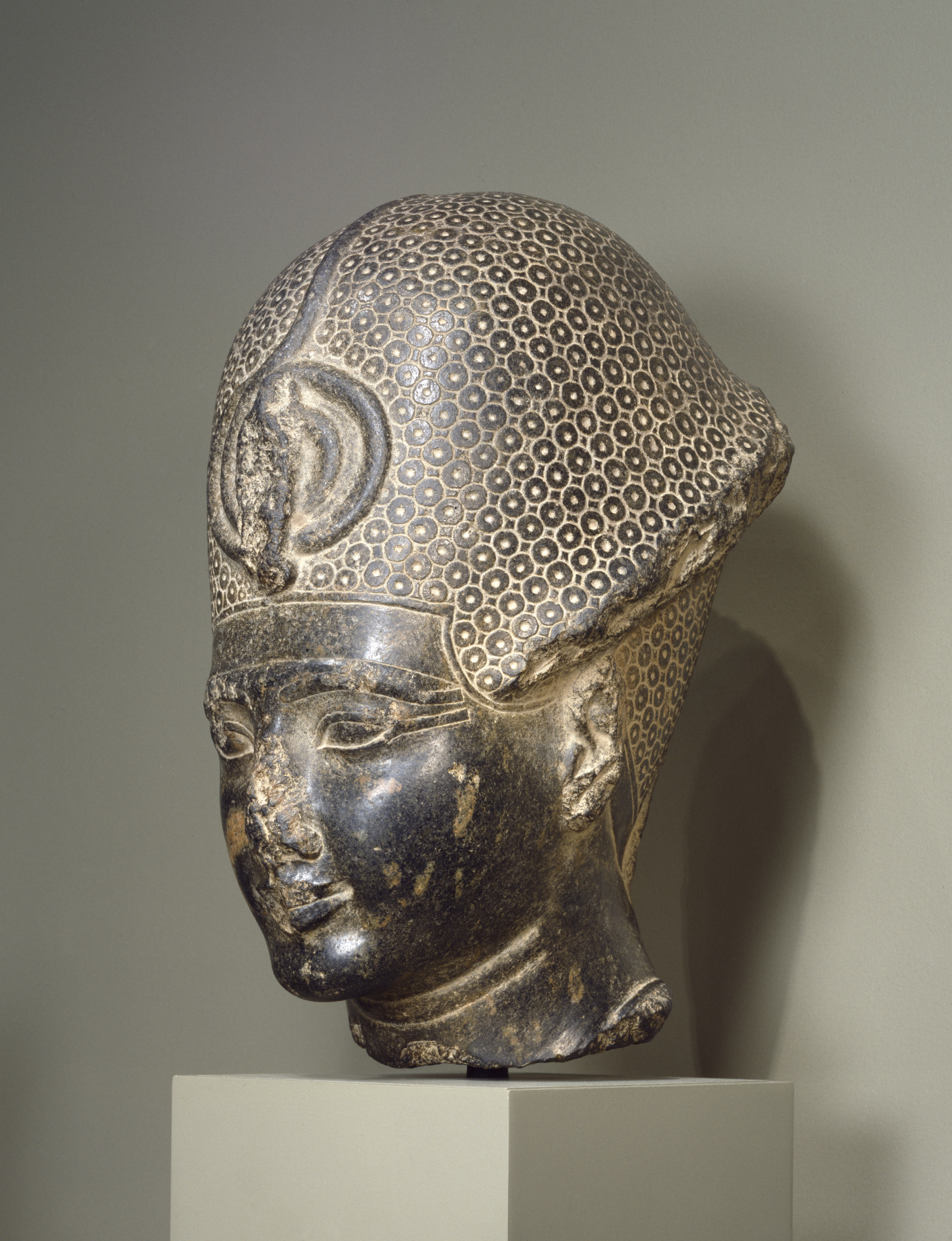
This statue shows Amenhotep III (recarved as Ramesses II) wearing the khepresh crown. Walters Art Museum, Baltimore.

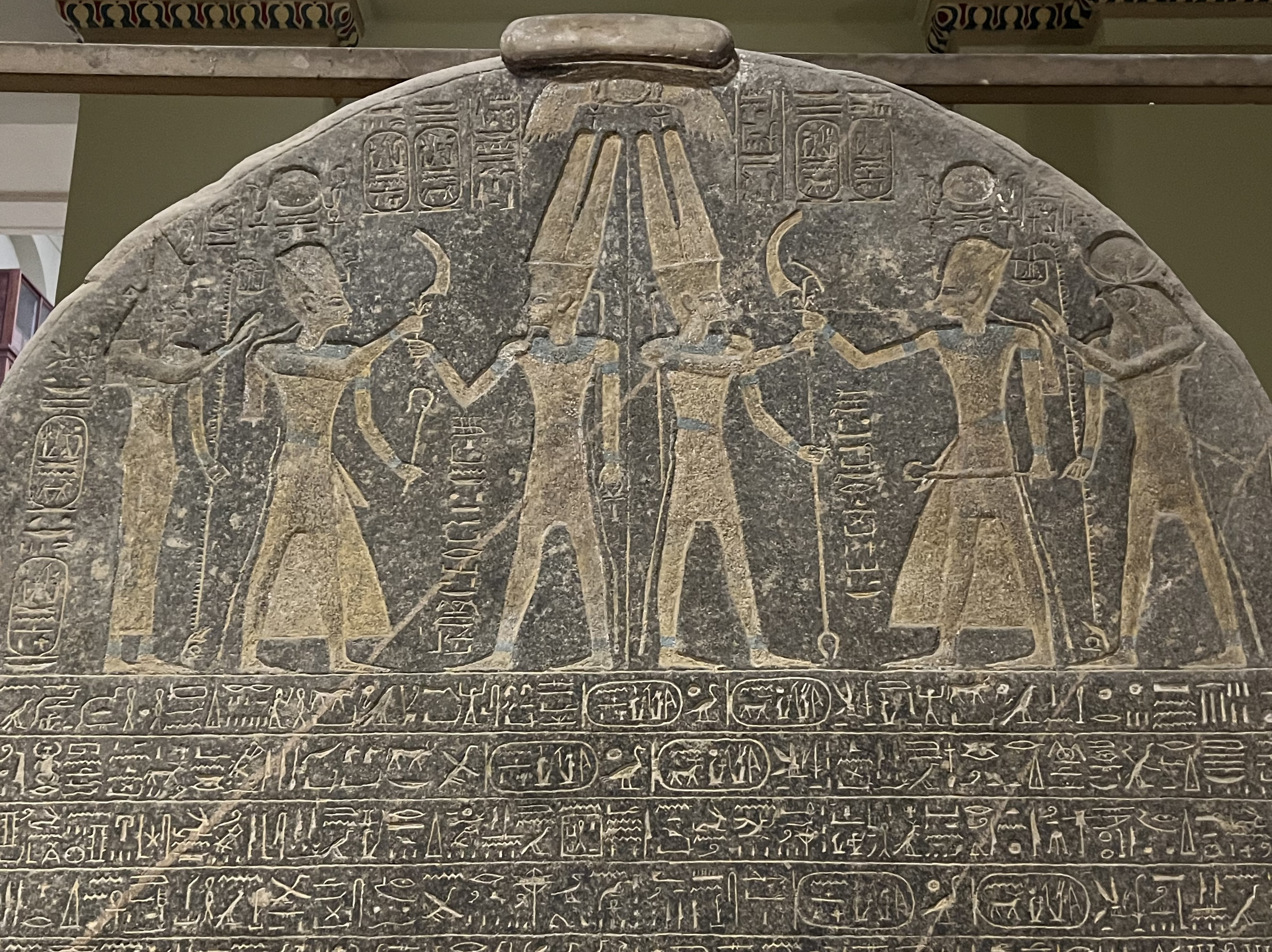
Merneptah

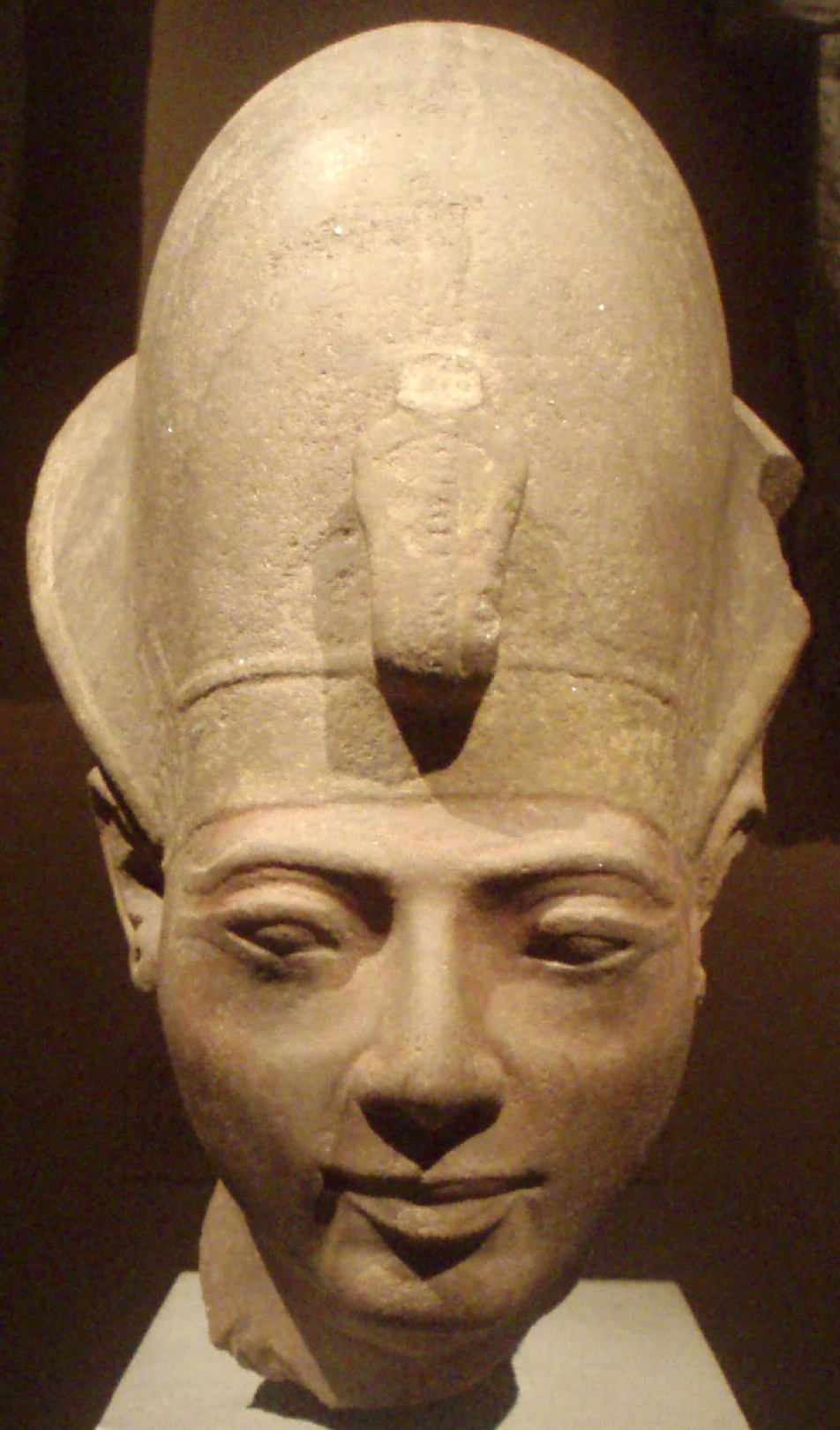
Amenmesse

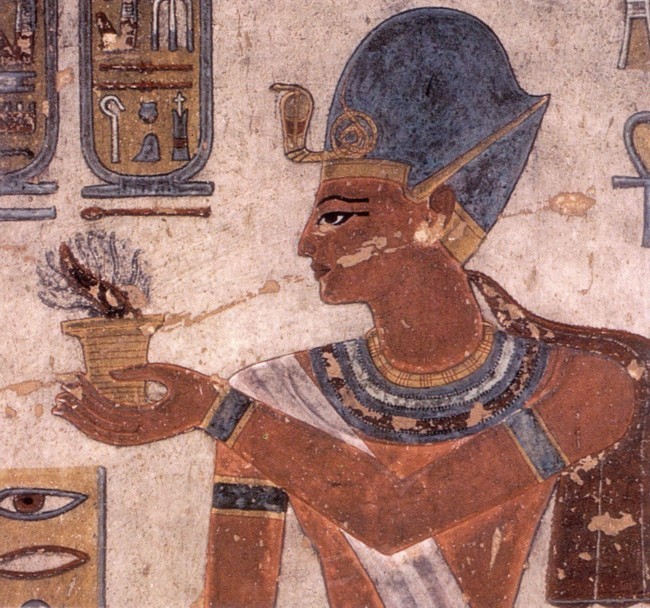
Ramesses III

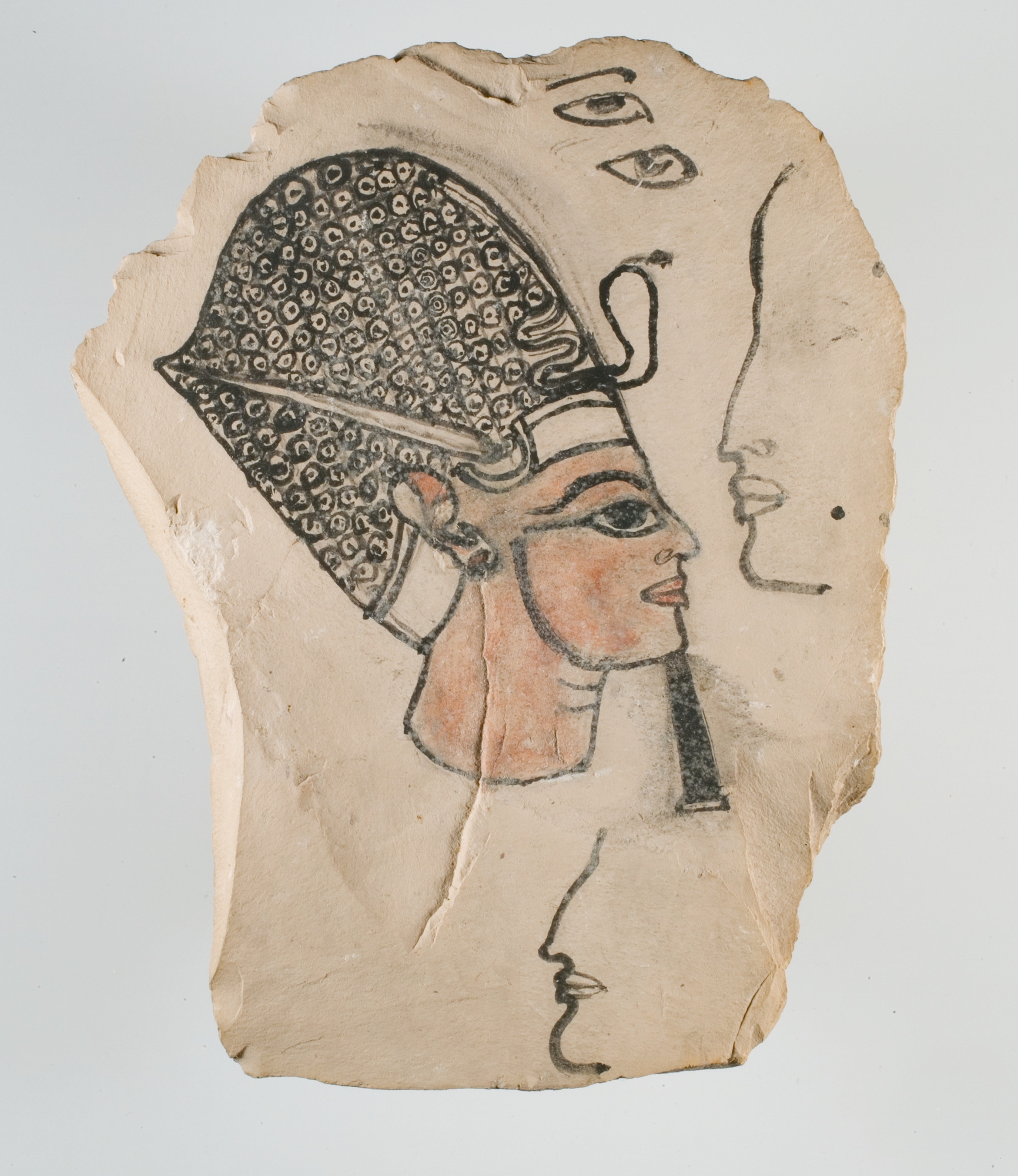
Ramesses IV

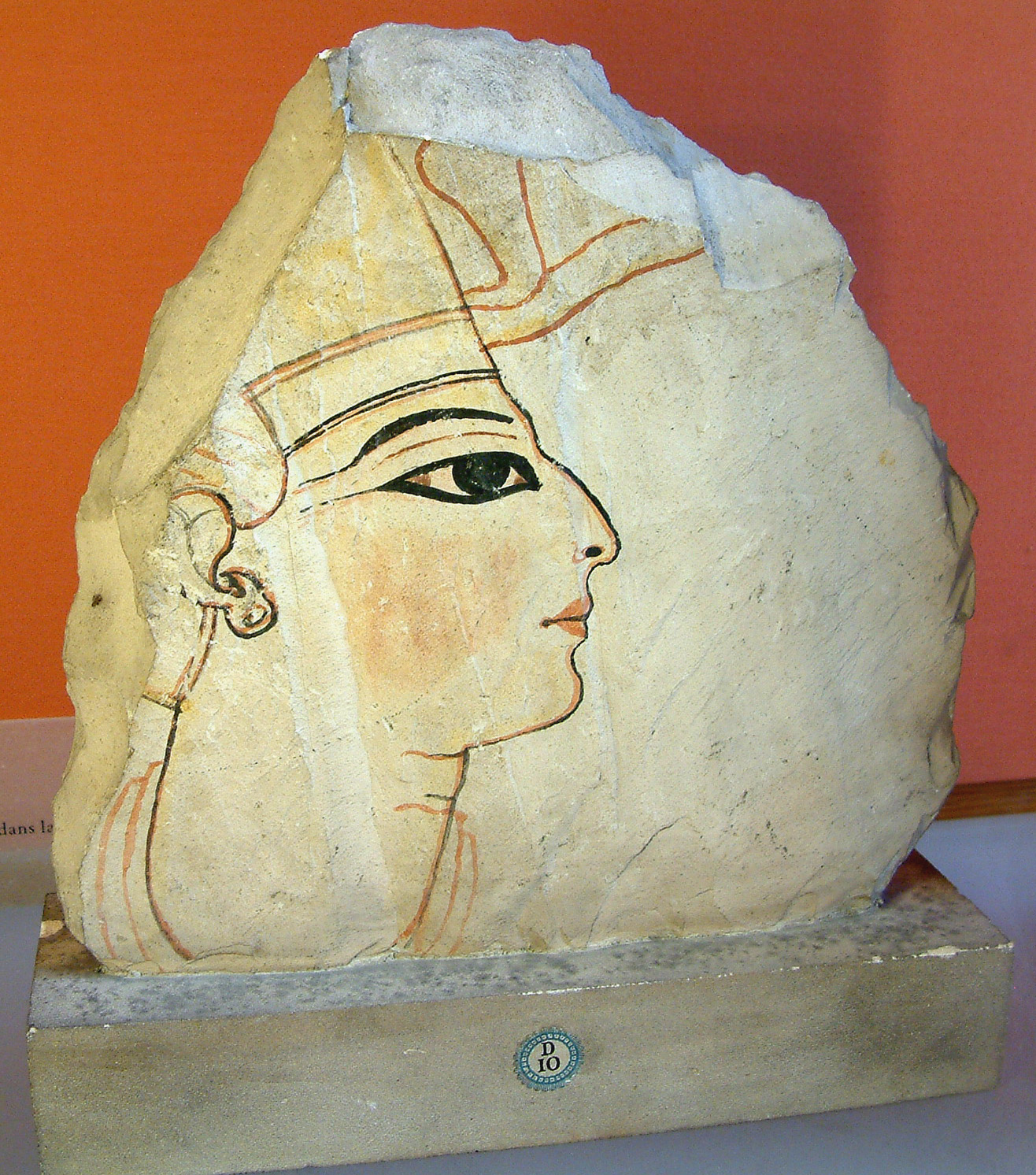
Ramesses VI

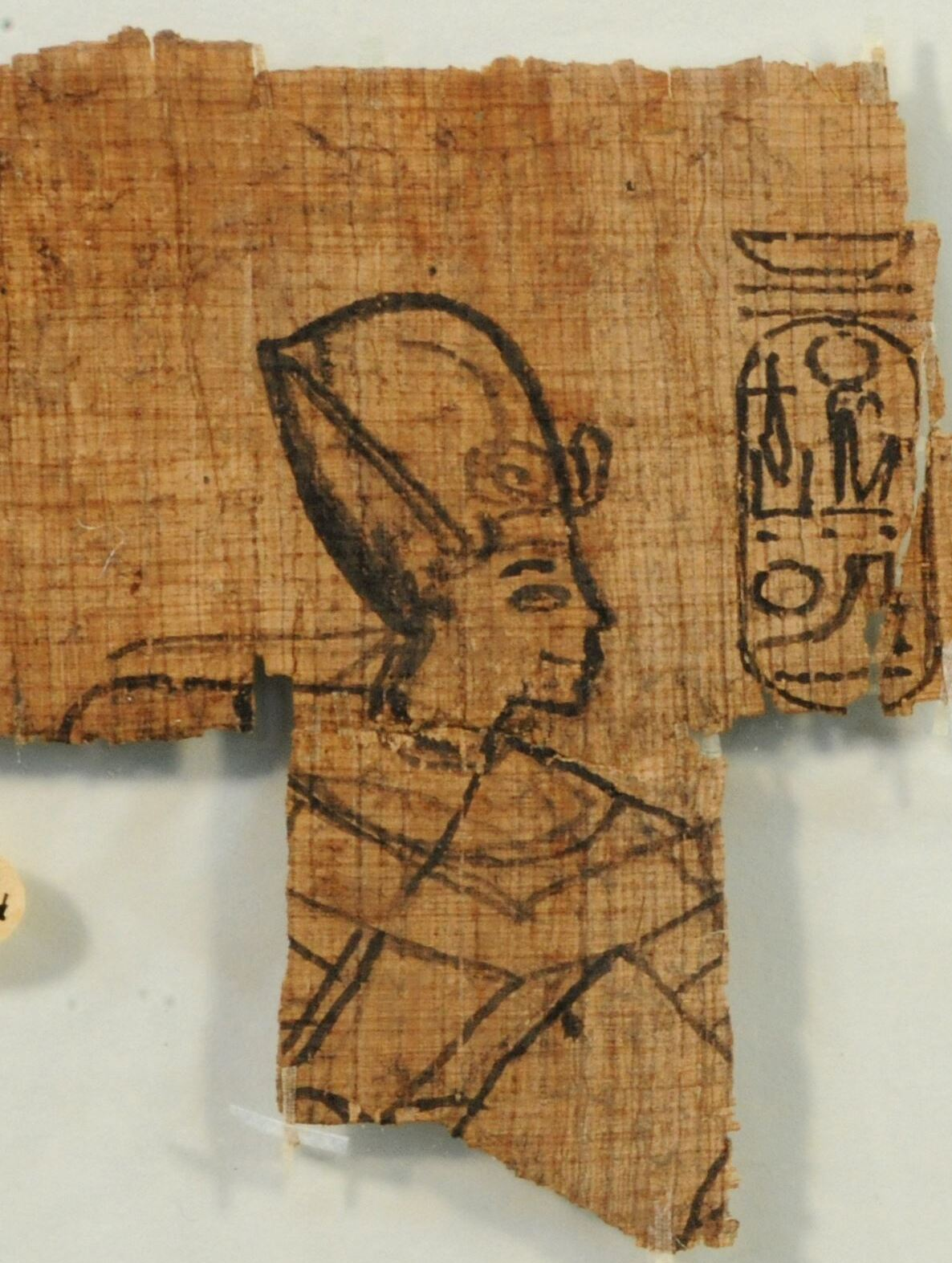
Ramesses VII

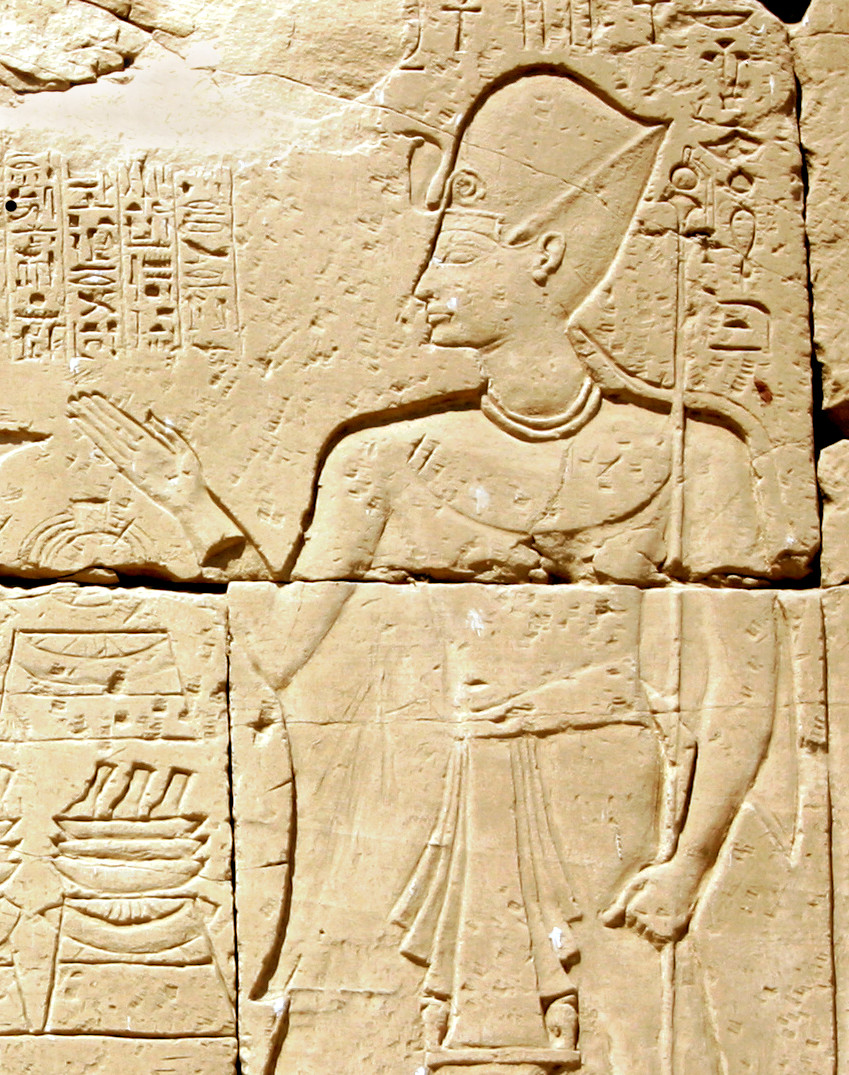
Ramesses IX

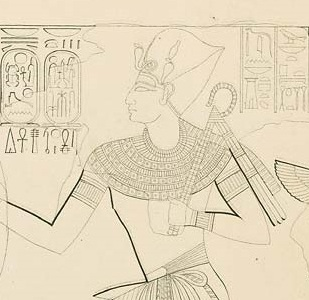
Ramesses X

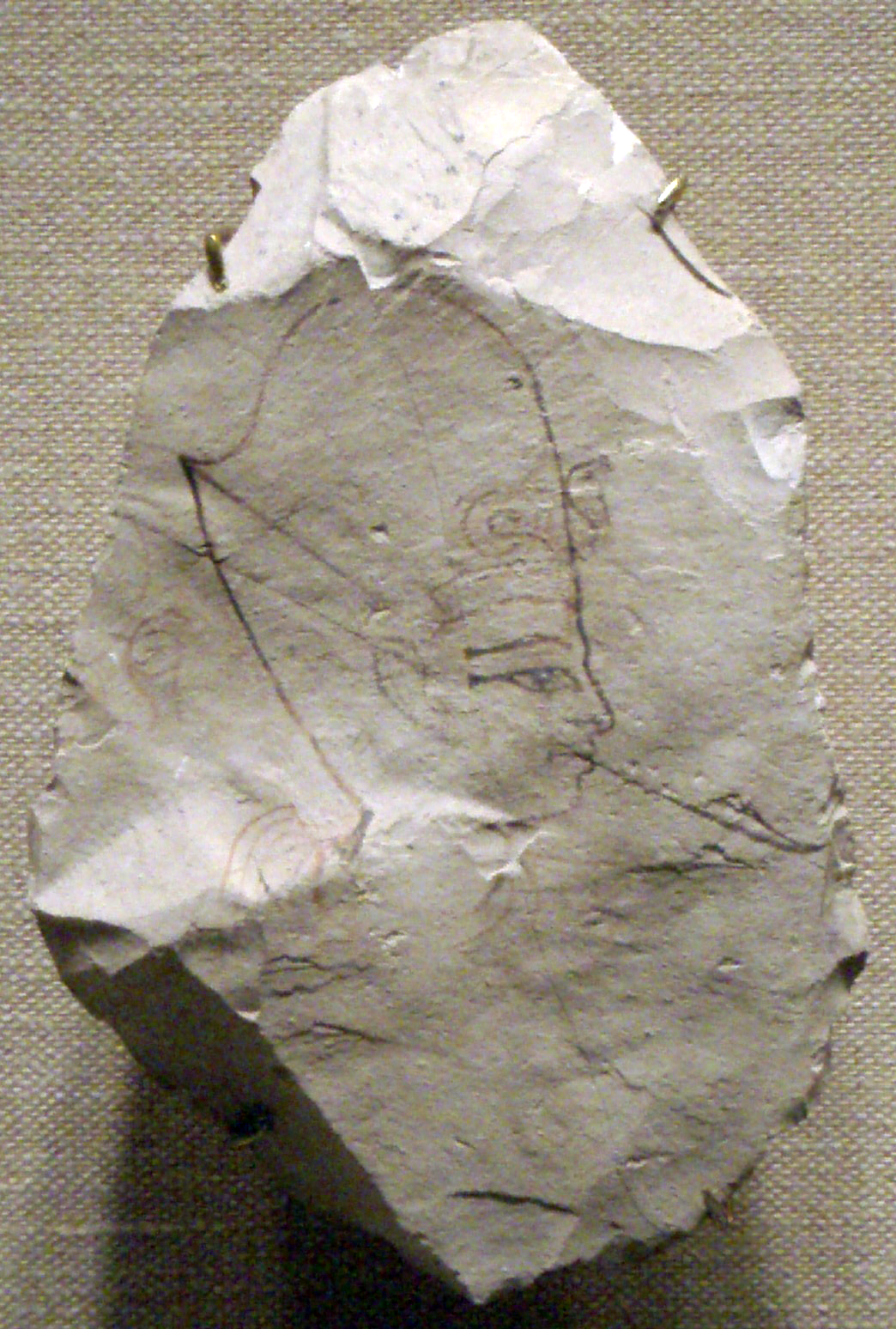
Ramesses XI

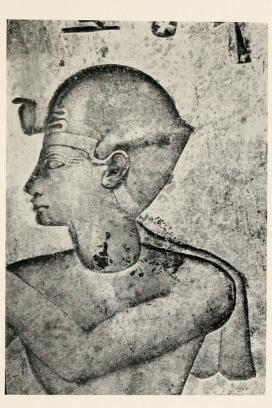
Siamun

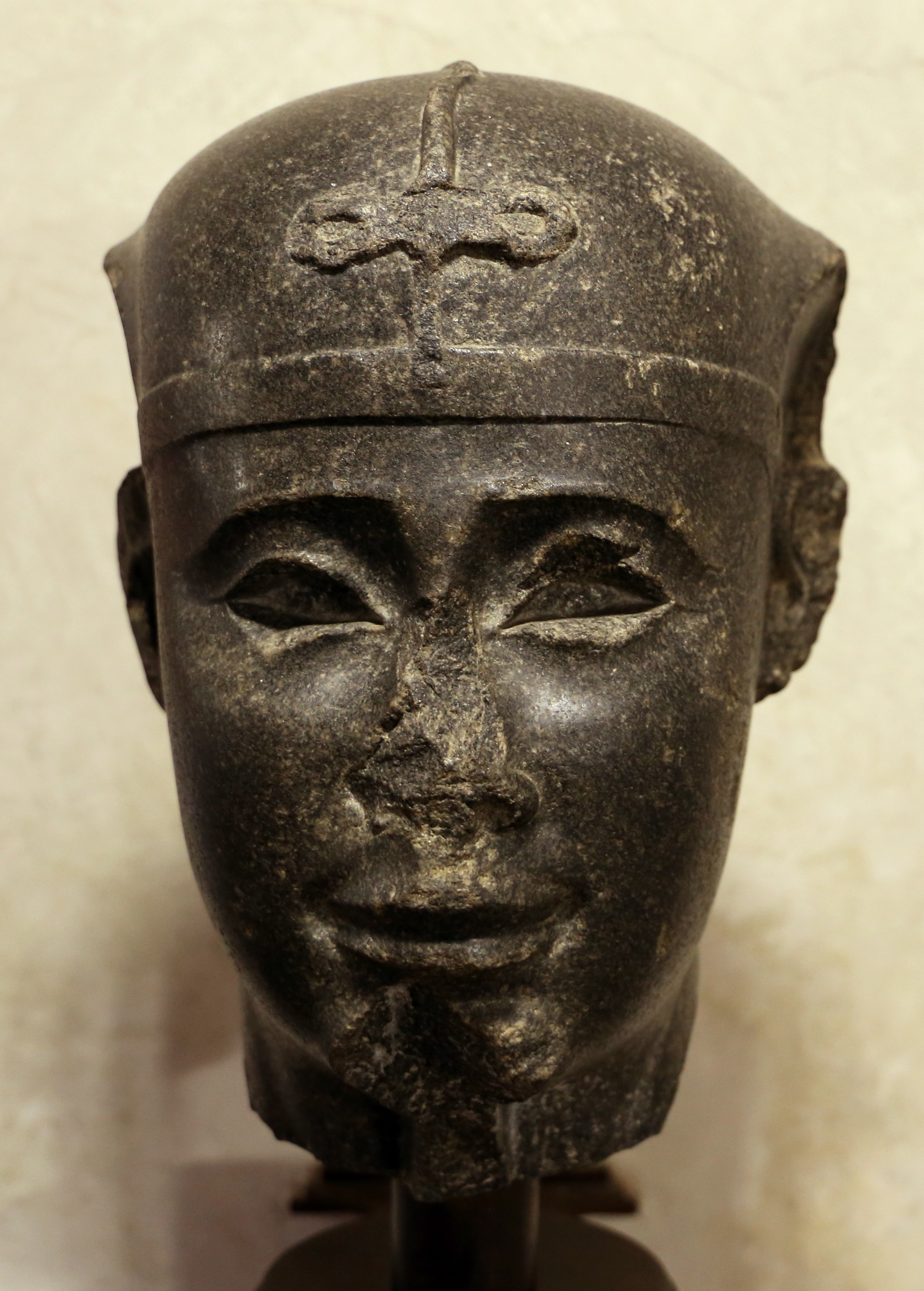
Psamtik I

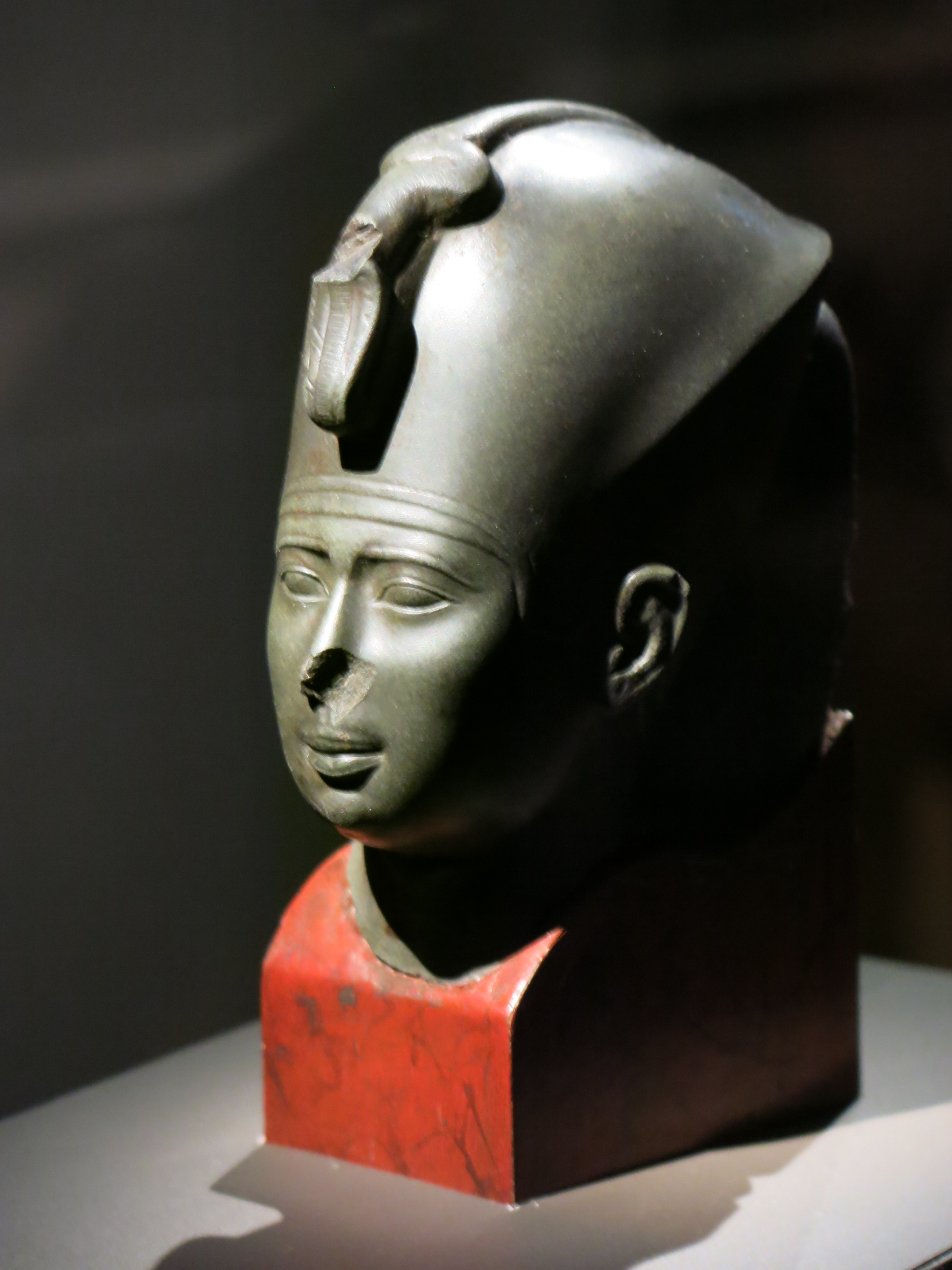
Psamtik II

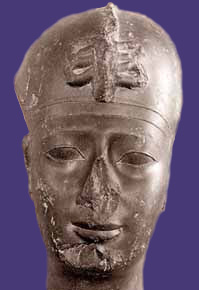
Apries

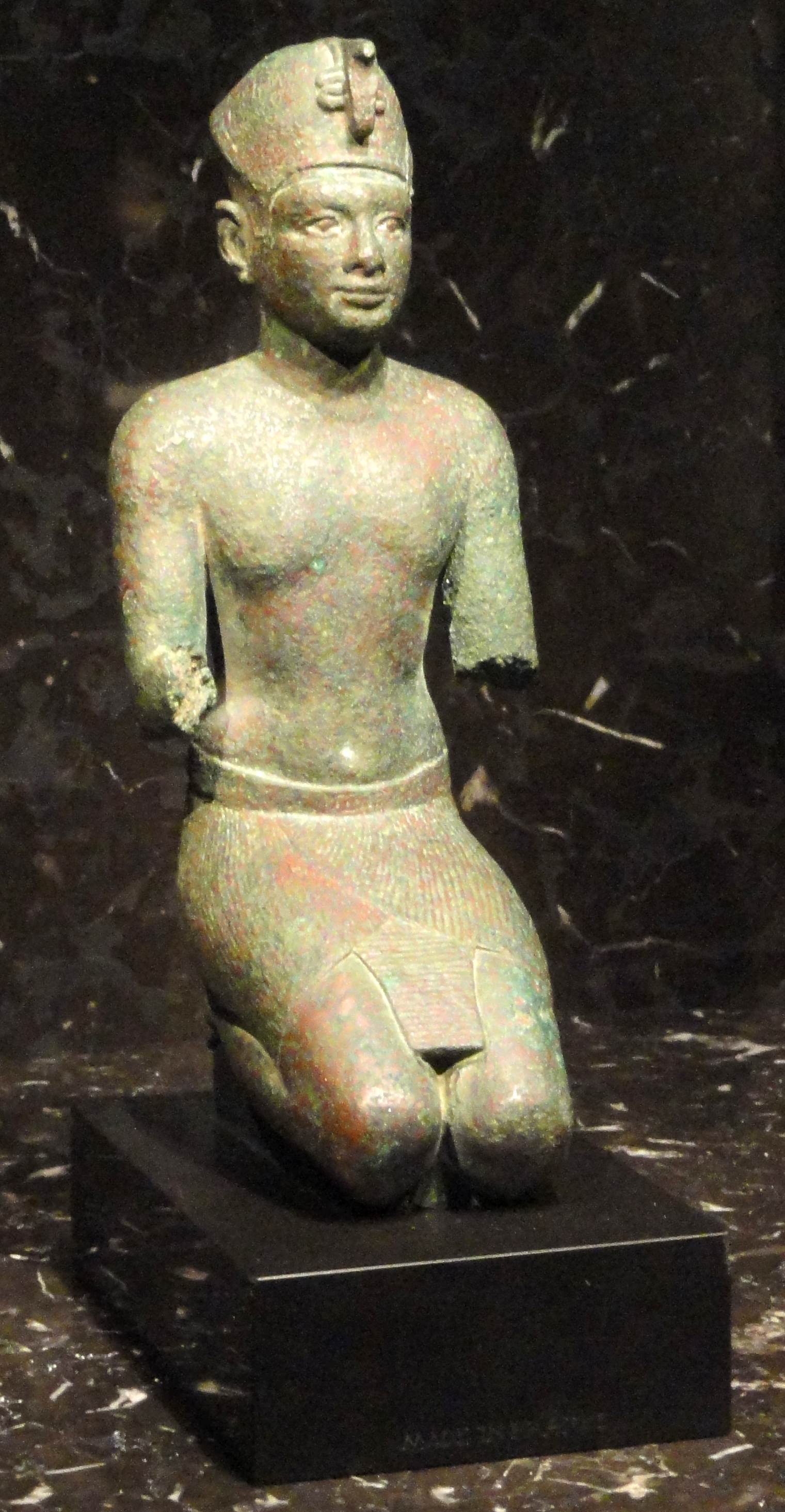
Hakor

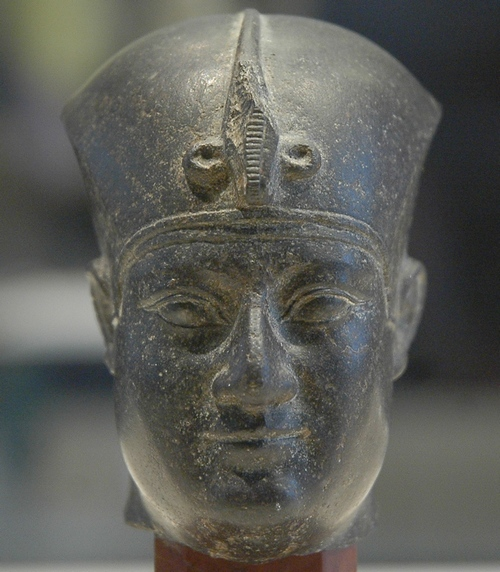
Nectanebo I

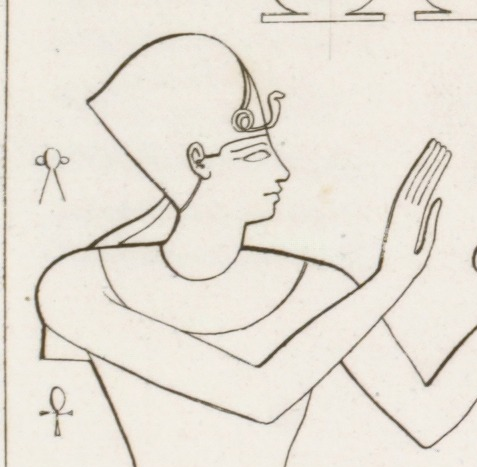
Teos

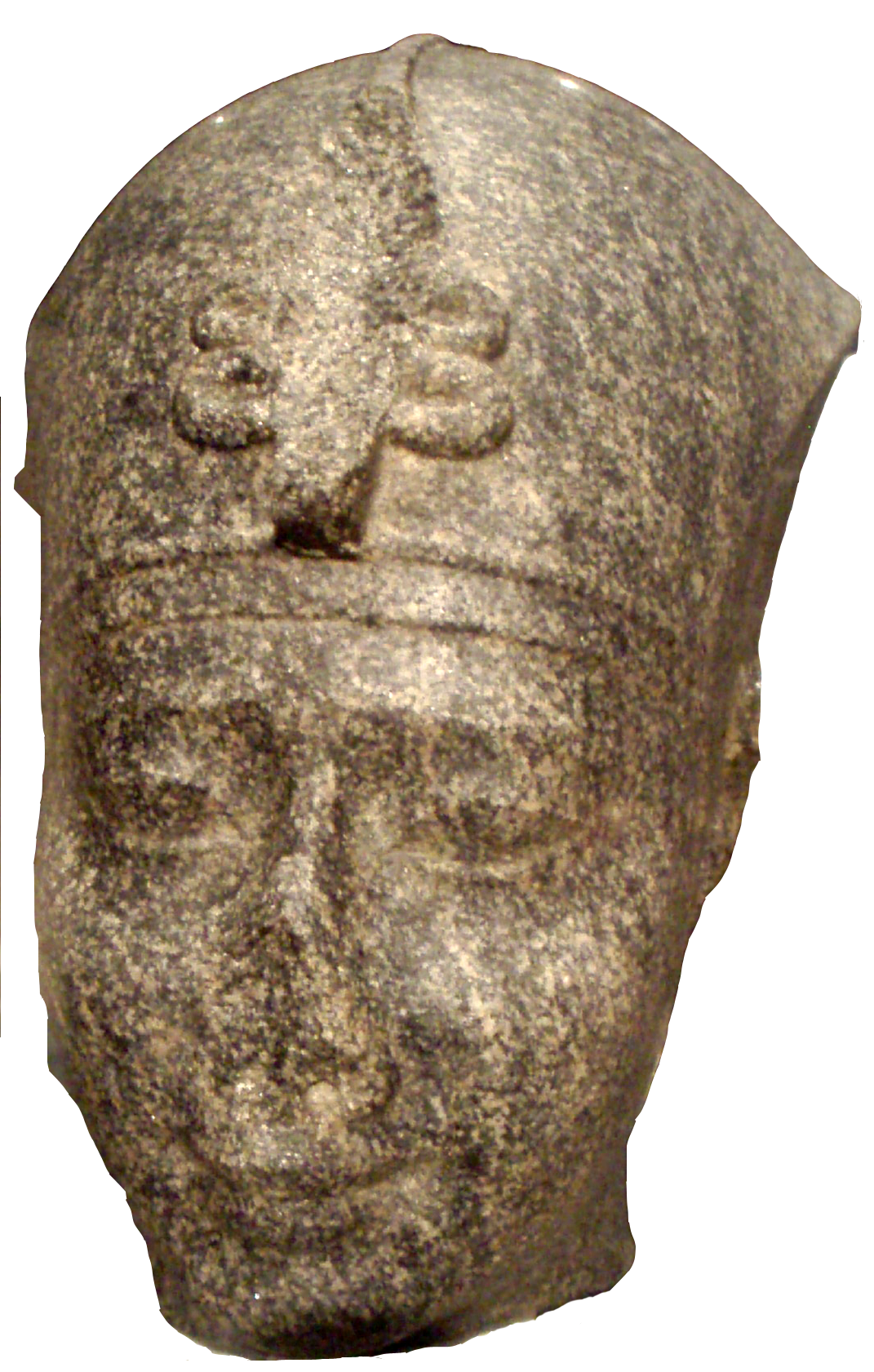
Nectanebo II

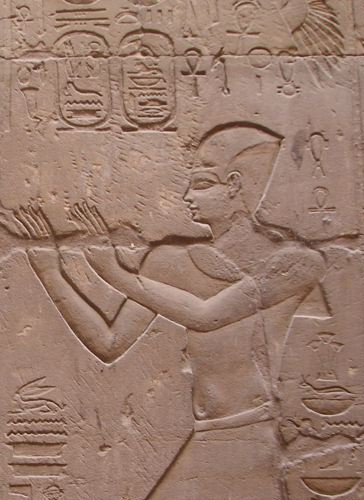
Alexander the Great

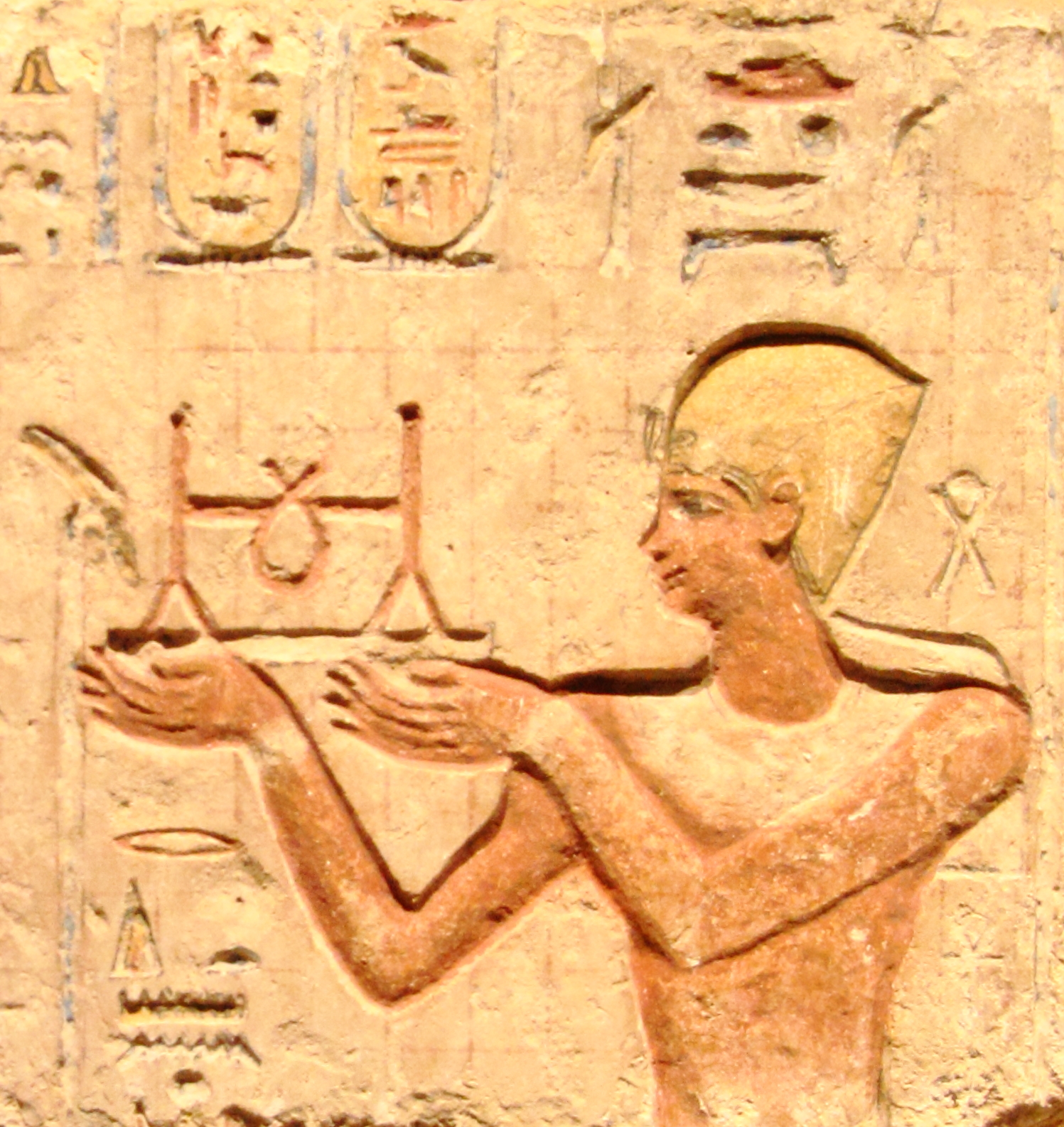
Ptolemy I

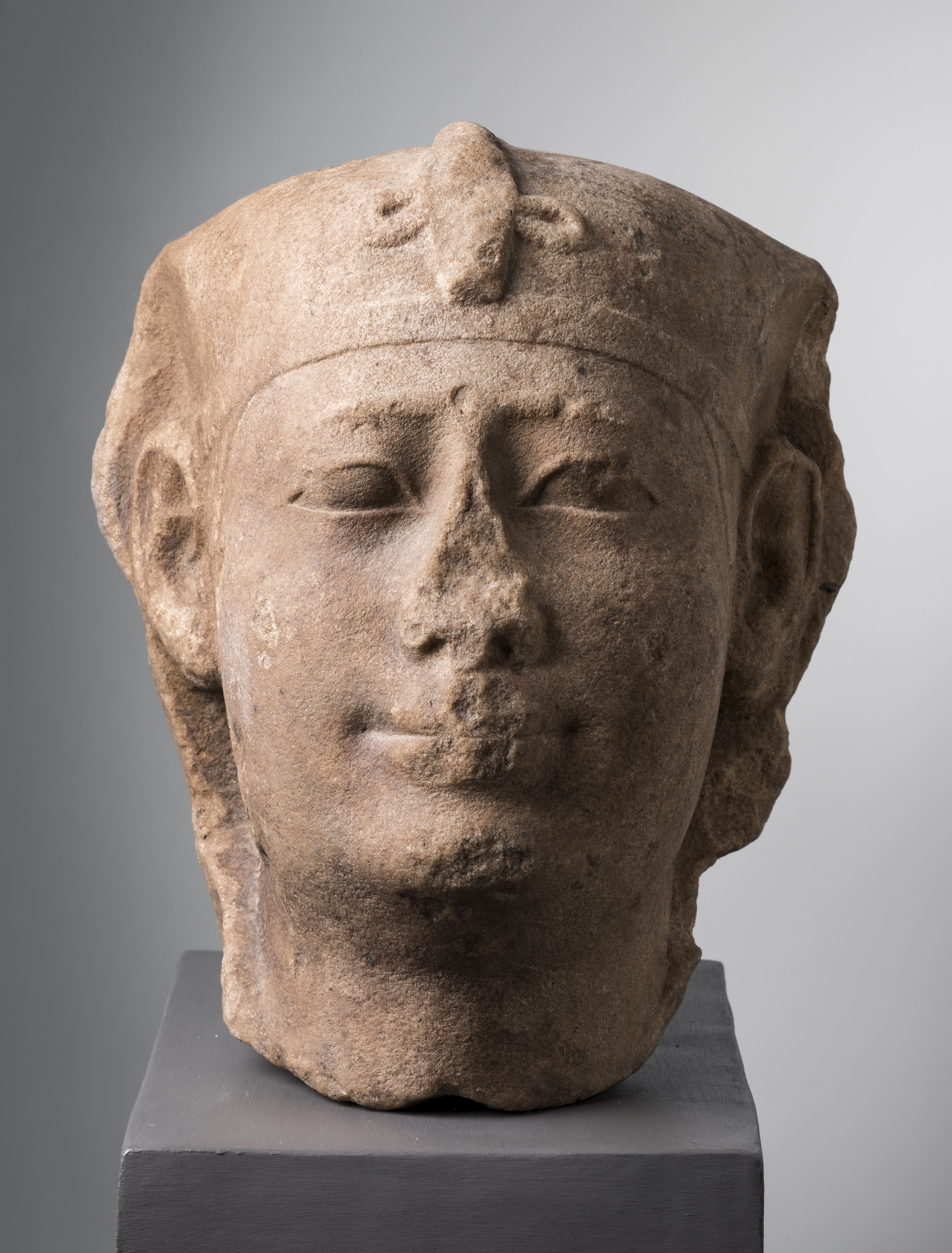
Ptolemy II

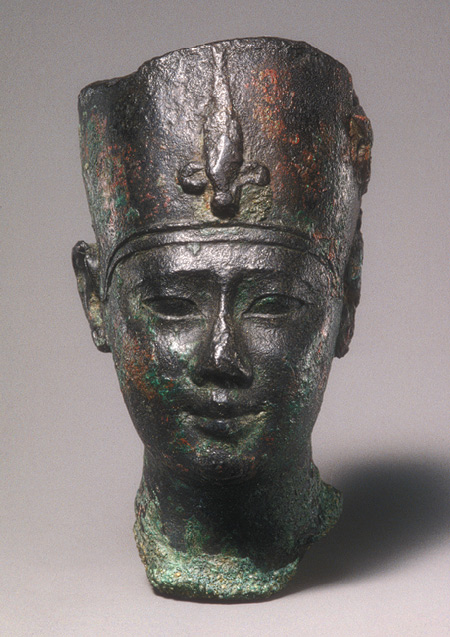
Ptolemy III

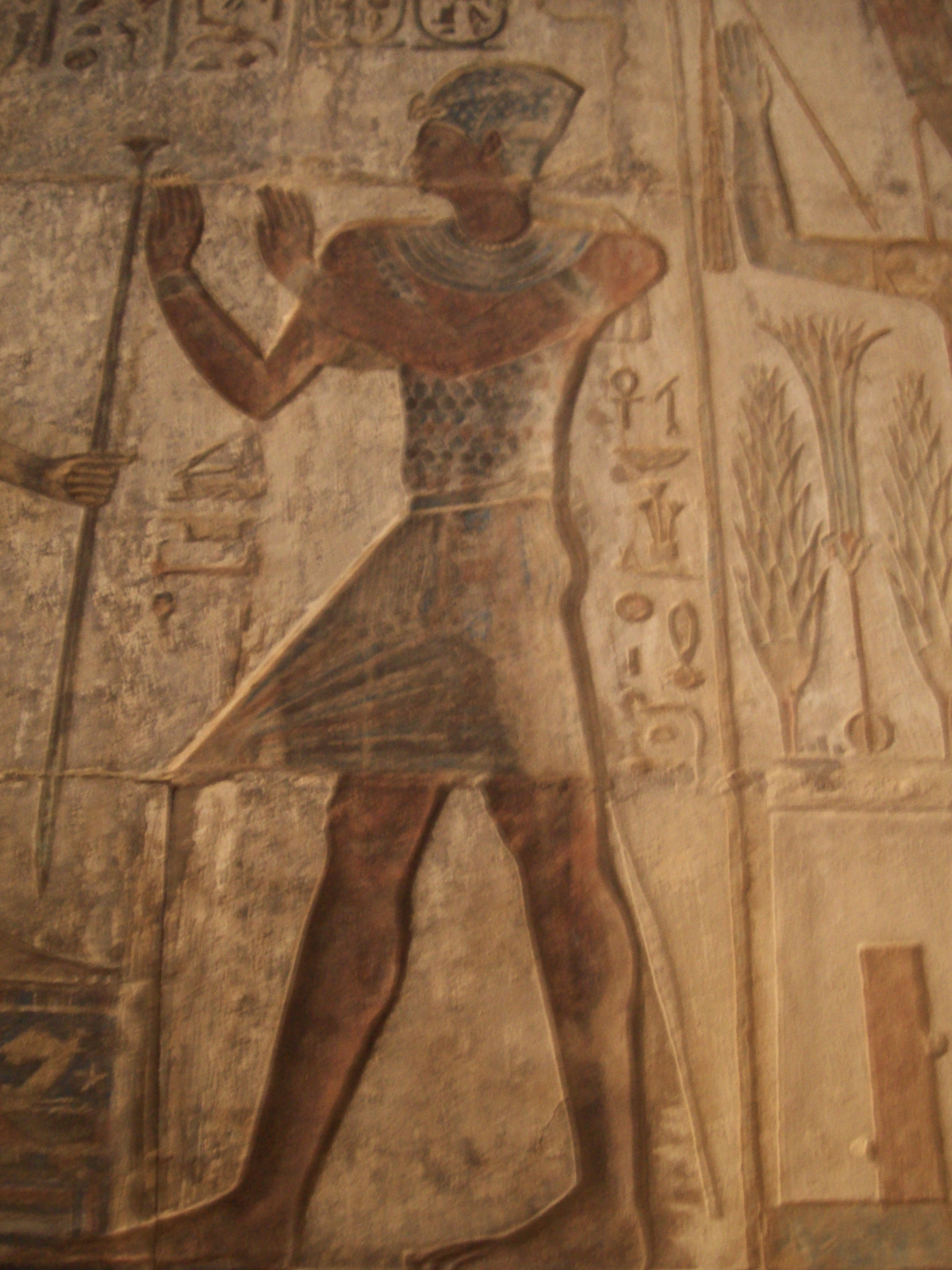
Ptolemy IV

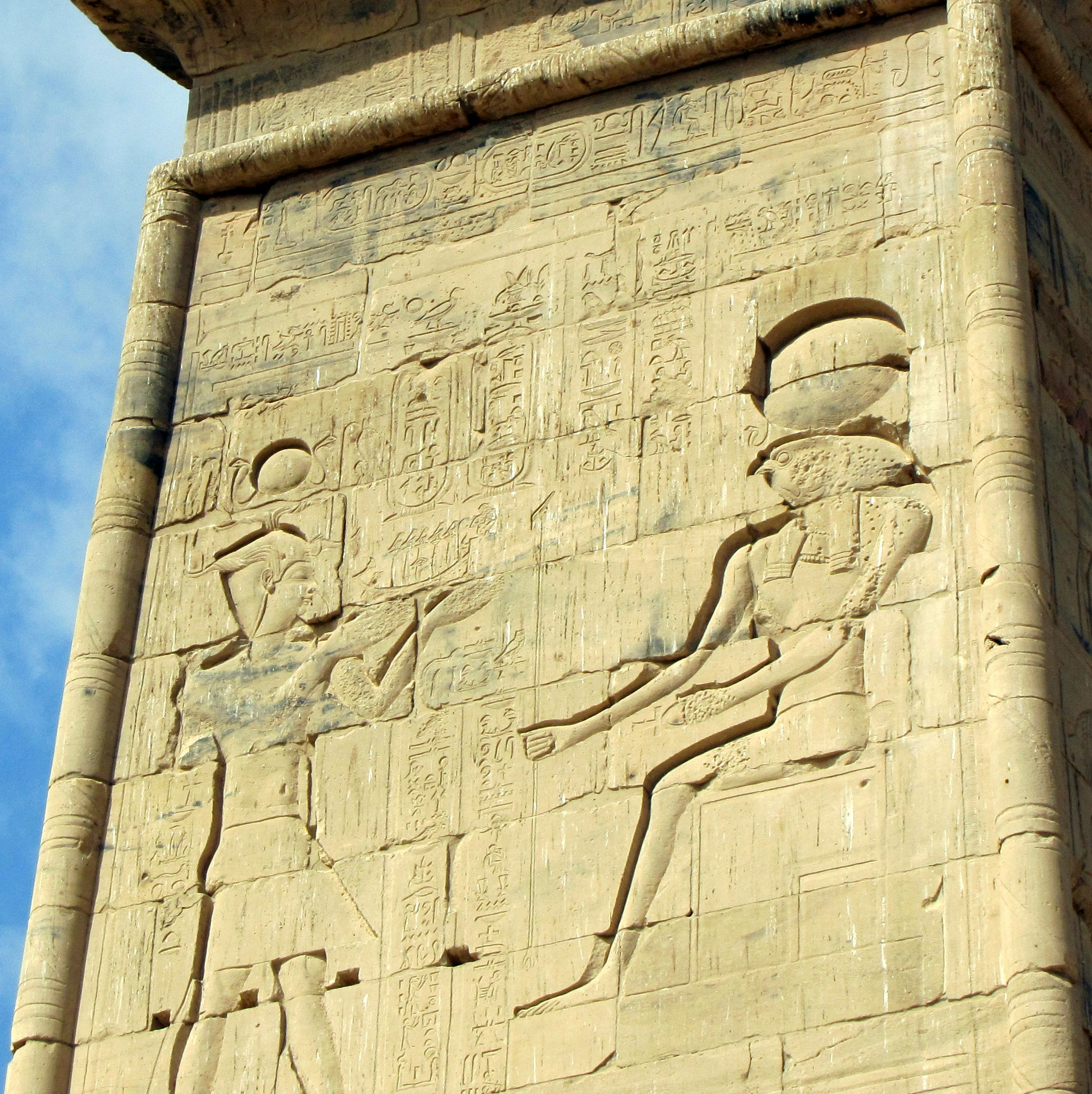
Ptolemy VI (left)

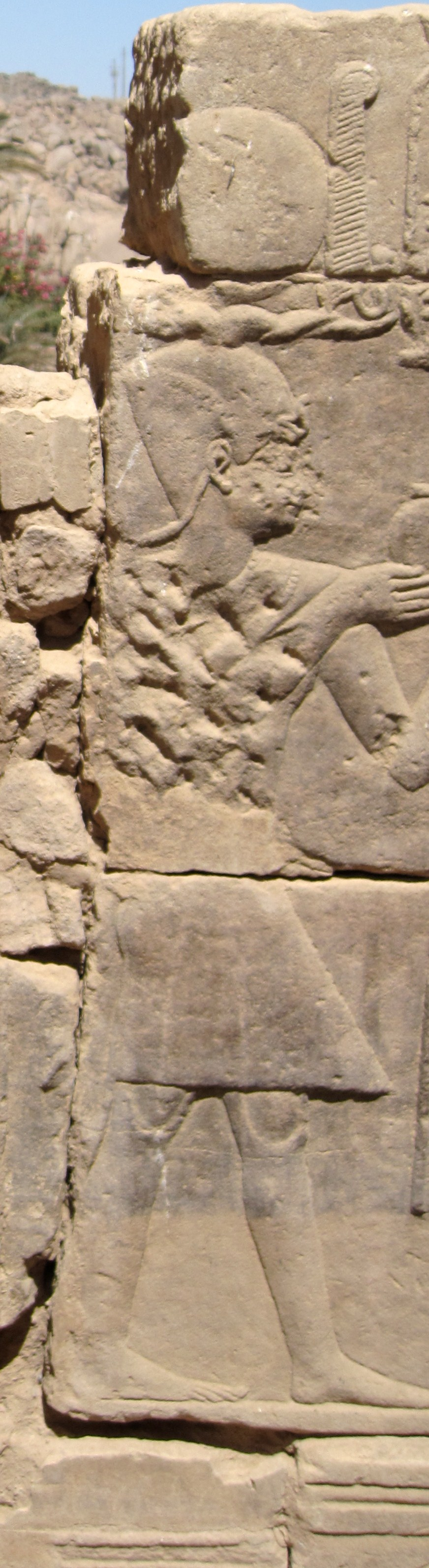
Ptolemy VIII

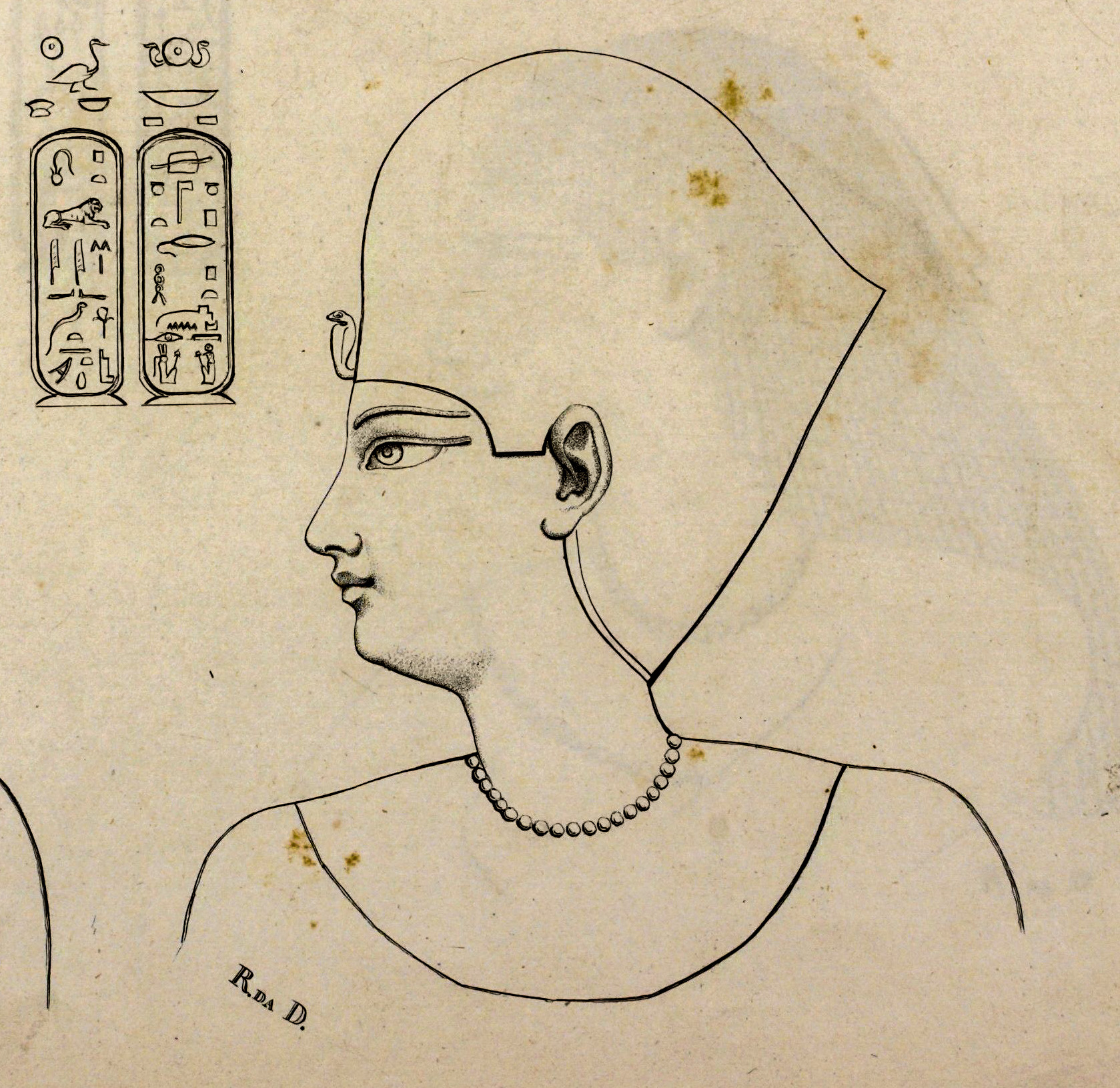
Ptolemy XII

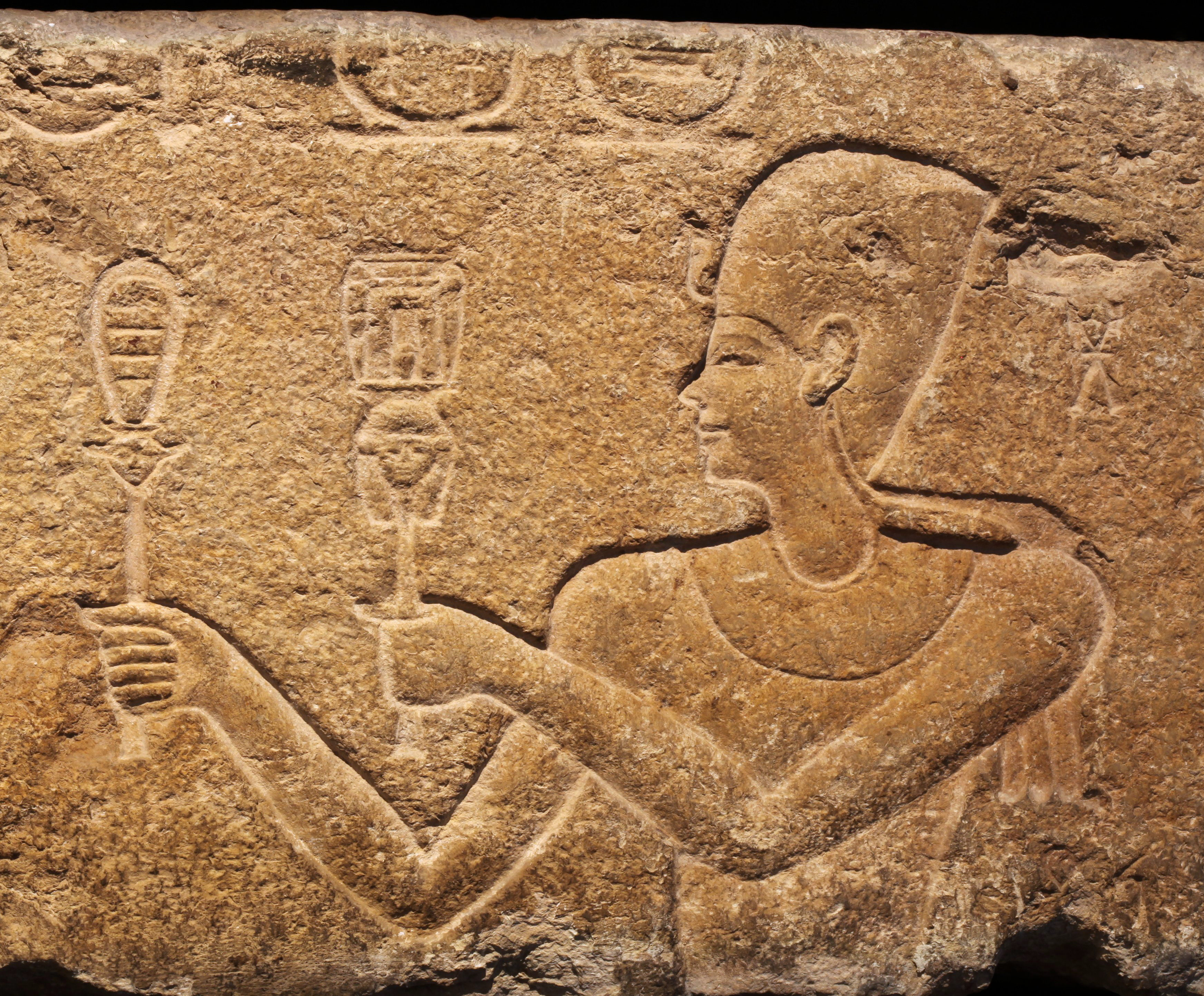
Ptolemy XV (Caesarion)

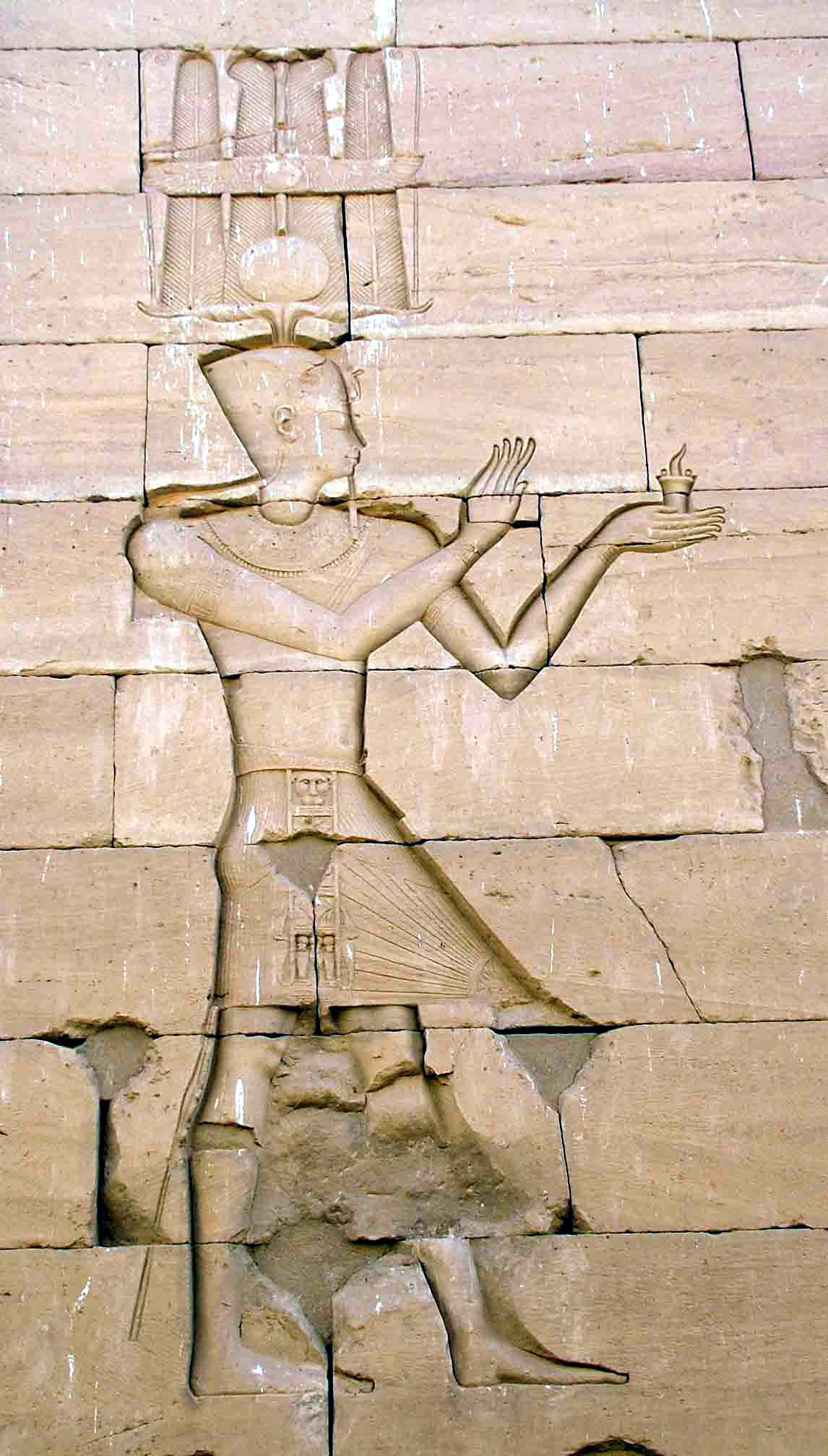
Augustus

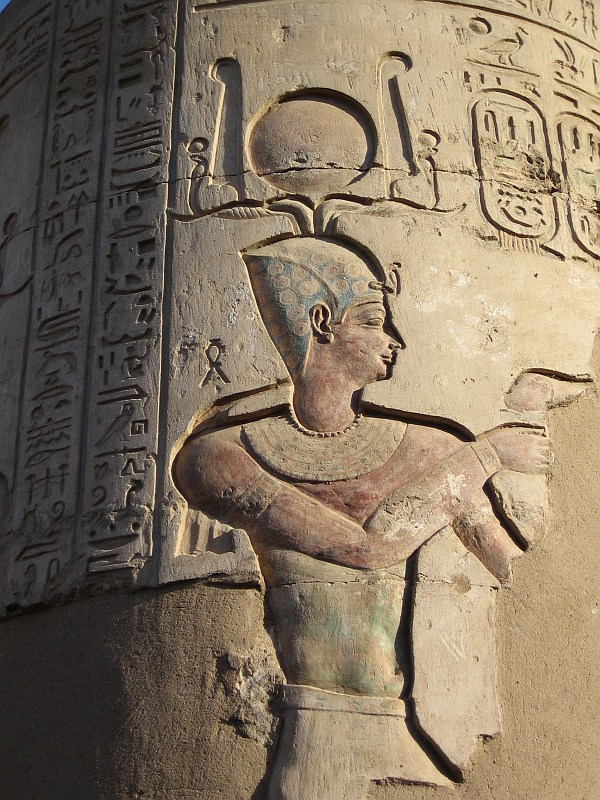
Tiberius

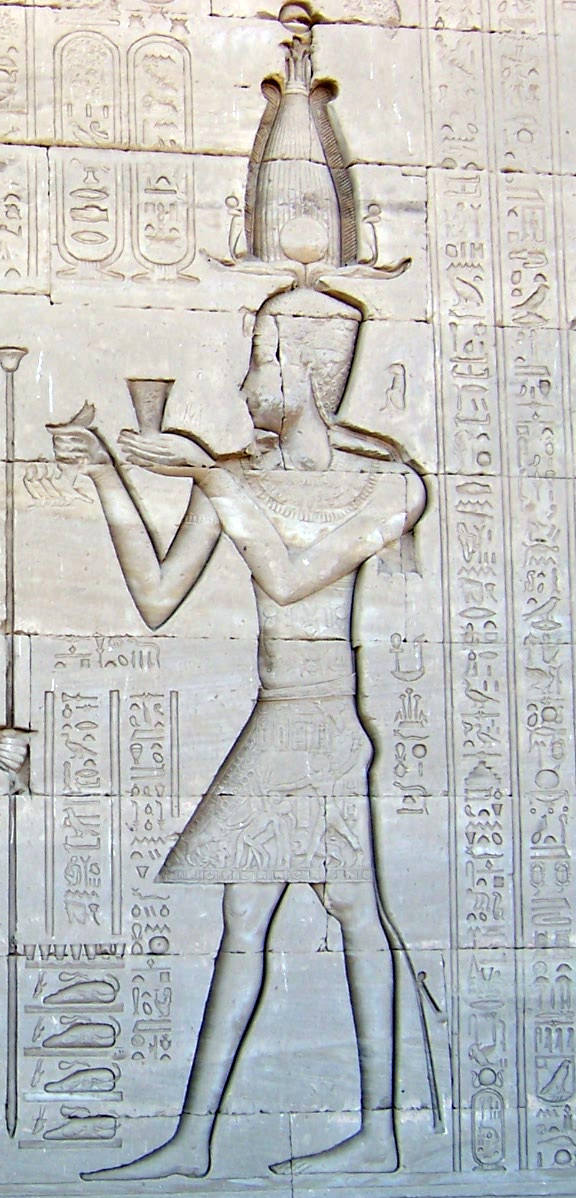
Nero

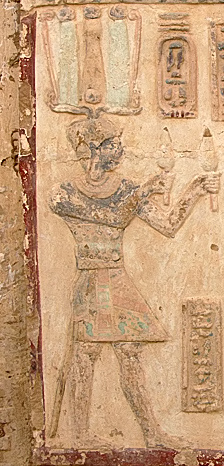
Titus

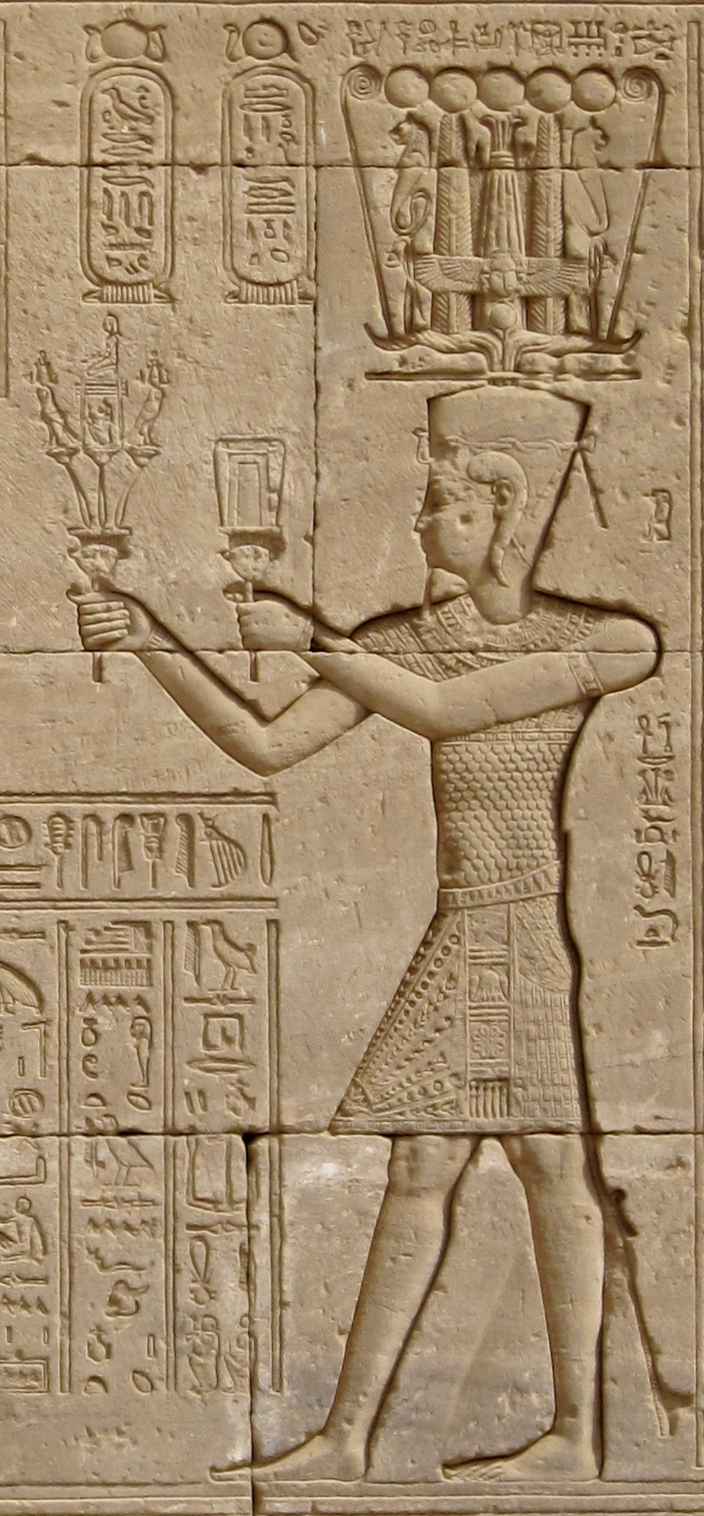
Trajan

== See also ==
- Crowns of Egypt
- Atef – Crown with feathers identified with Osiris
- Deshret – Red Crown of Lower Egypt
- Hedjet – White Crown of Upper Egypt
- Nemes - striped head-dress of pharaohs
- Pschent – Double Crown of Lower & Upper Egypt
