= Nepra =

Nepra may refer to:

- Neper (mythology)
- National Electric Power Regulatory Authority of Pakistan
- an East Slavic goddess of the Dnieper River
