= Clothing in ancient Egypt =

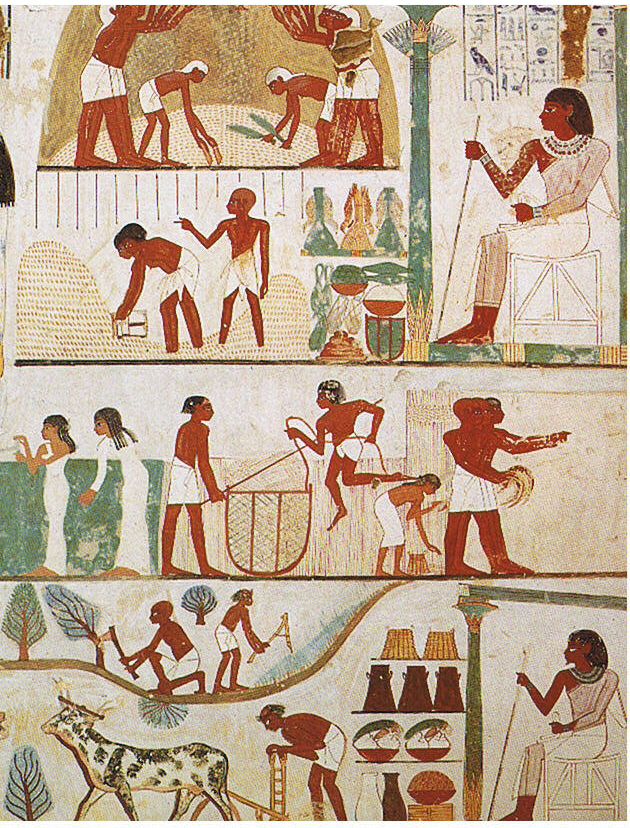
The clothing of men and women of several social levels of ancient Egypt are depicted in this tomb mural from the Eighteenth Dynasty (15th century BC).

Ancient Egyptian clothing comprises the garments, jewelry, footwear, and wigs worn by individuals in Egypt from the end of the Neolithic period (prior to 3100 BC) to the collapse of the Ptolemaic Kingdom in 30 BC. Fashions in ancient Egypt changed slowly over time and were influenced by foreign styles. Recognizable aspects of ancient Egyptian clothing include white linen kilts, sheath dresses, bag-tunics, and mantles; usekh collars; sandals; and wigs.

== Materials ==
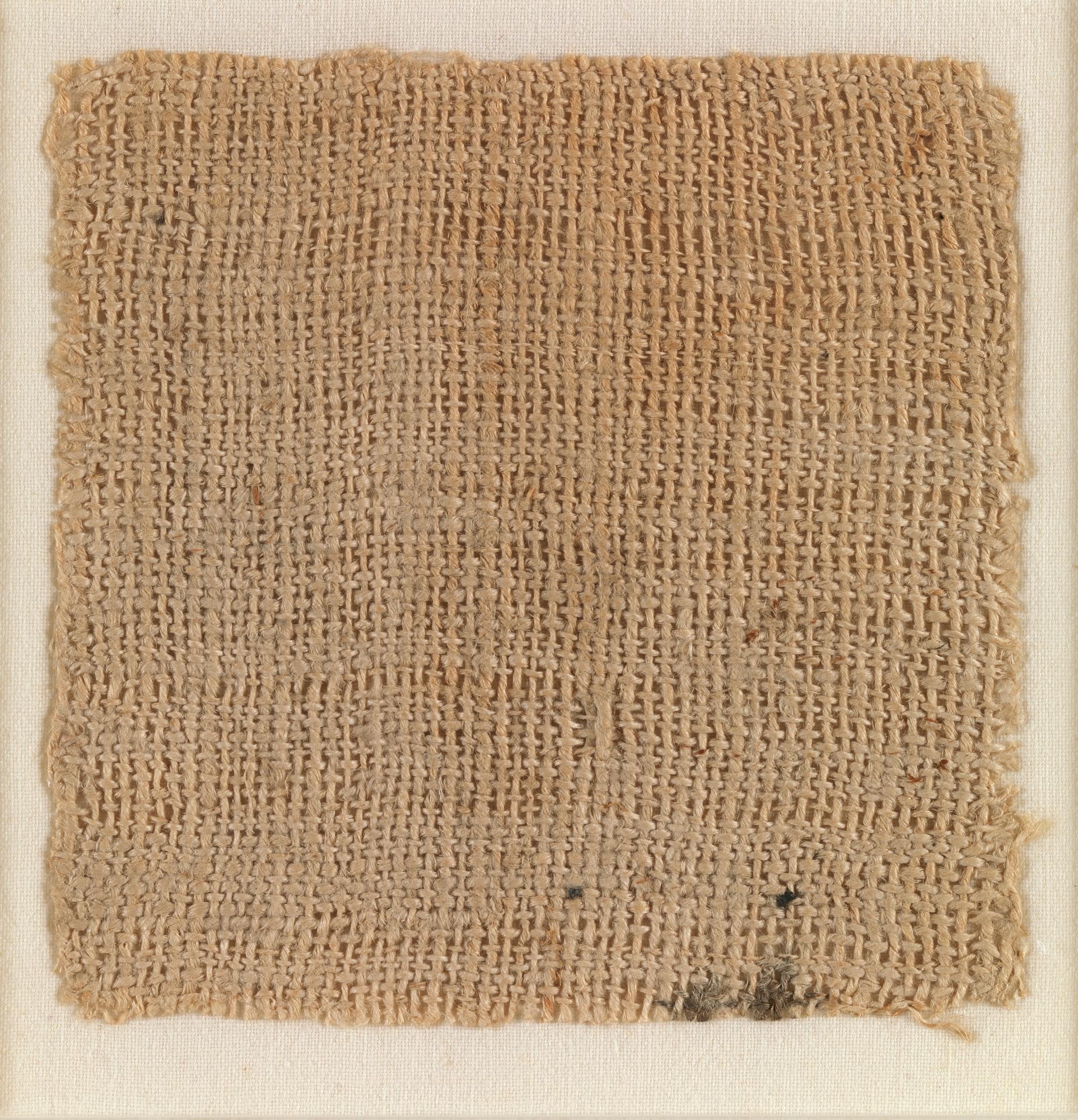
Sample of ancient Egyptian linen from Saqqara, dating to 390-343 BC (Late Period)

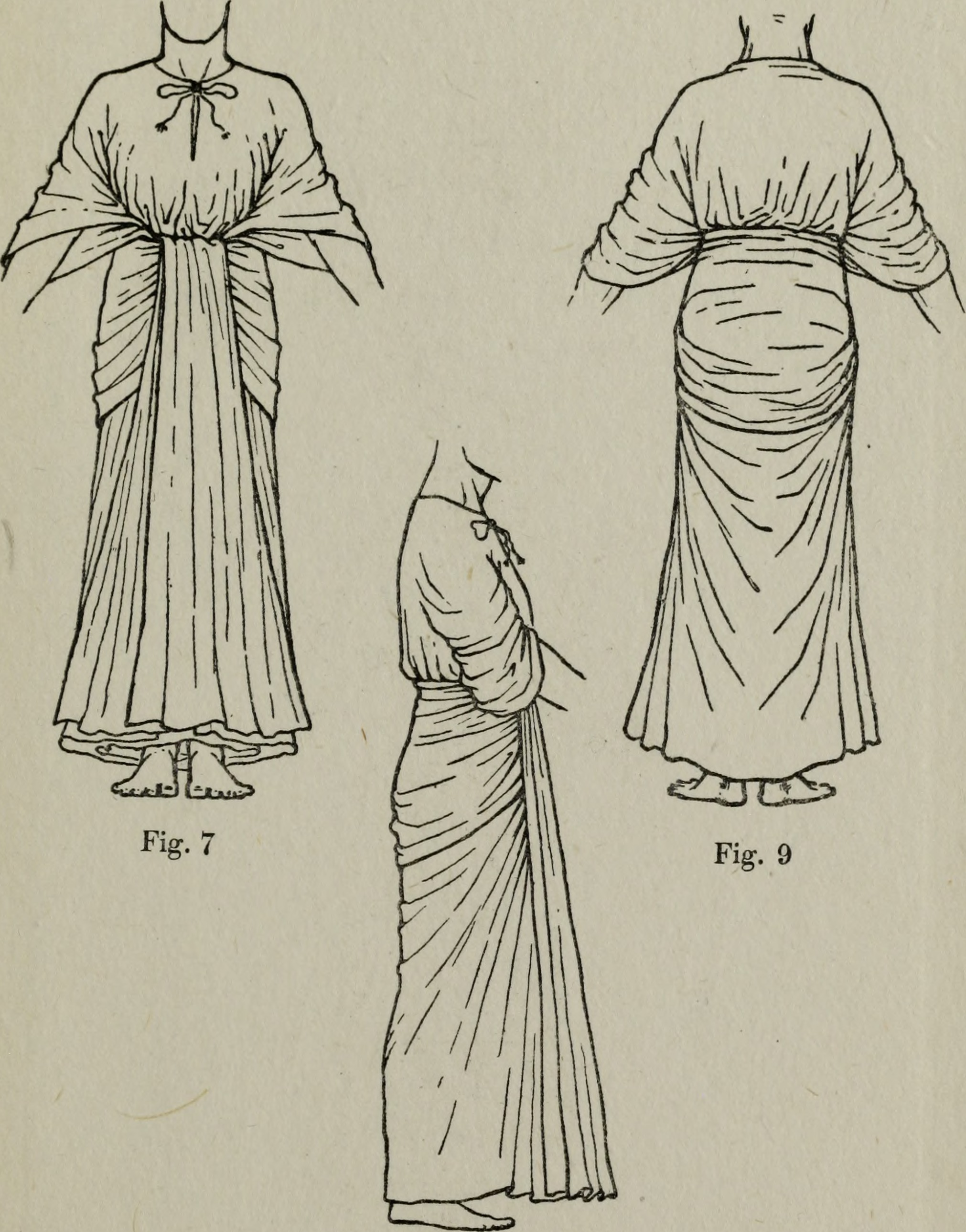
Modern illustration of a man's tunic in the style popularized in the New Kingdom

In ancient Egypt, linen was by far the most common textile. It helped people to be comfortable in the subtropical heat. Linen is made from the flax plant by spinning the fibers from the stem of the plant. Spinning, weaving and sewing were very important techniques for all Egyptian societies. Plant dyes could be applied to clothing but the clothing was usually left in its natural color. Wool was also used to a lesser extent, as were coir-type fibers such as hemp, grass, and reed, although fabric made from the latter group was not common. The misconception that wool was considered unclean by the ancient Egyptians can be attributed to Herodotus.

Peasants, workers and other people of modest condition often wore nothing, but the shenti (made of flax) was worn by all people. Slaves often worked naked.

Unique headdresses included the khat, a loose headcloth worn by men of noble rank, and the nemes, a striped cloth reserved for monarchs.

== Deities ==
There were several ancient Egyptian deities related to fabrics, clothing and weaving, chiefly the god Hedjhotep and the goddess Tayt.

== Pharaohs ==
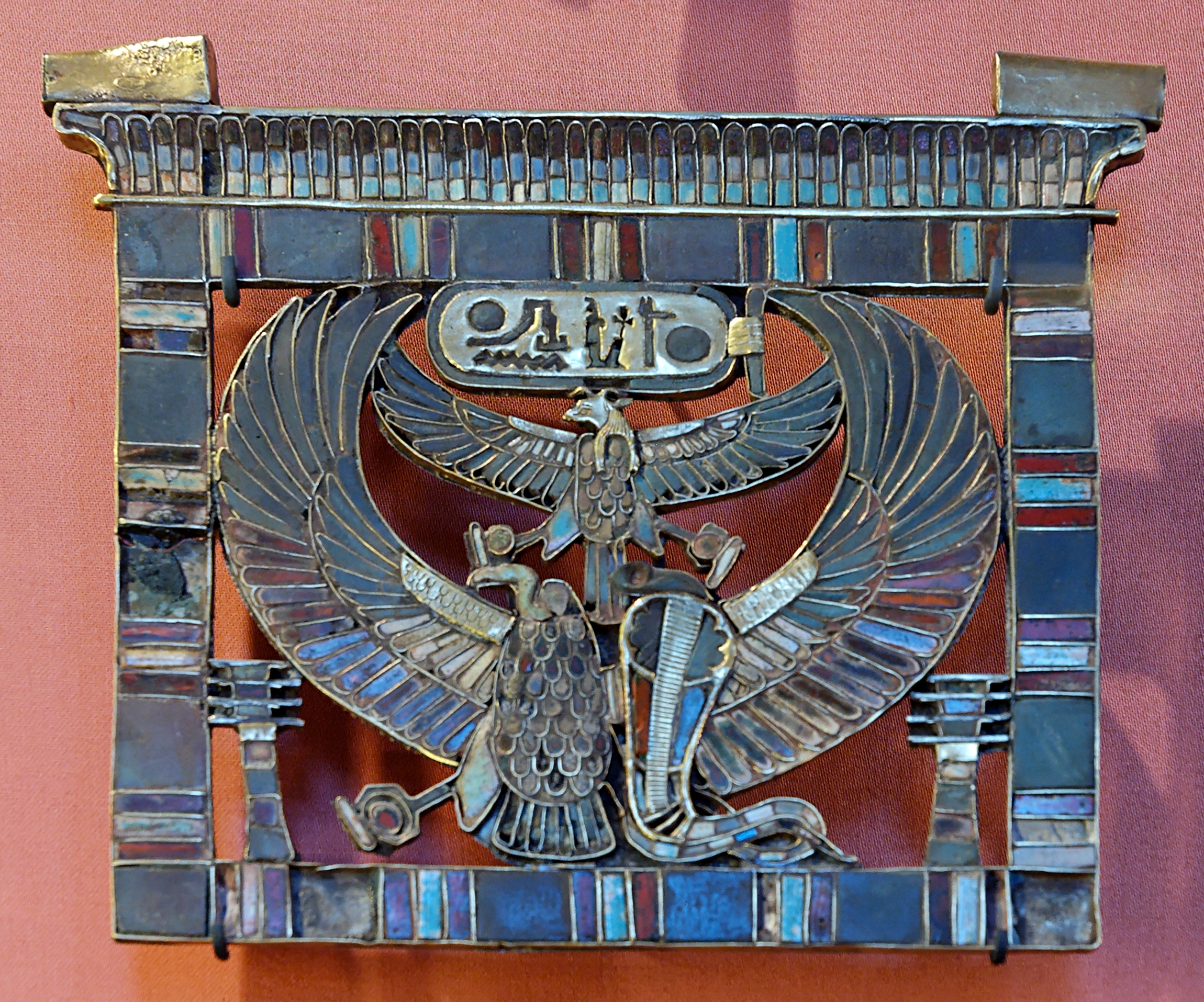
Pectoral of Ramesses II.

Royal clothing is particularly well documented, as well as the khat, nemes, and crowns of the pharaohs. The pharaohs would often wear animal skins, usually leopard or lion, as a sign of their station.

== Men ==
Typical depiction of an Egyptian man in standard clothes

From about 2130 BC during the Old Kingdom, garments were simply constructed. Men wore wrap around skirts belted at the waist. This style of dress was consistent across class but higher class Egyptians wore more finely crafted pieces.

While women's clothing stayed mostly the same during the Middle Kingdom, men's clothing changed in some regards (as evidenced by available art). The two most notable changes were the pleating of the skirts and the adoption of the triangular apron by upper-class men. This starched ornamented kilt was held up by a sash and worn over a loincloth.

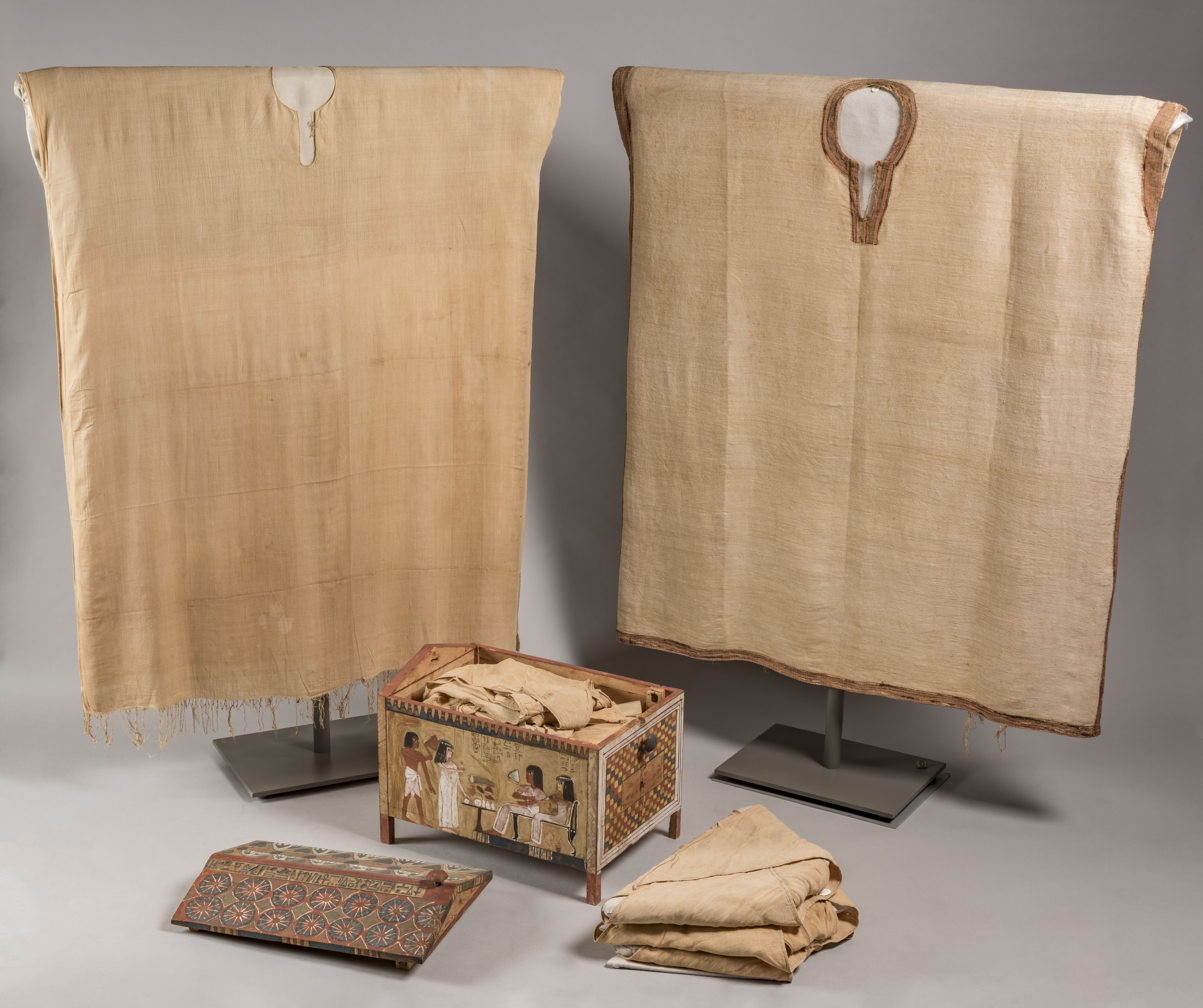
Two tunics and a chest of clothes, tomb of Kha and Merit, 14th century BCE, Museo Egizio in Turin

Artistic relics from the New Kingdom show the largest evolution in men's clothing. New Kingdom art depicts the use of sheer blouses with intricately pleated sleeves, as well as more elaborate pleating of the skirts with sheer overskirts. Still, only wealthier citizens could afford these materials.

== Women ==
Typical depiction of an Egyptian woman in clothing of the New Kingdom

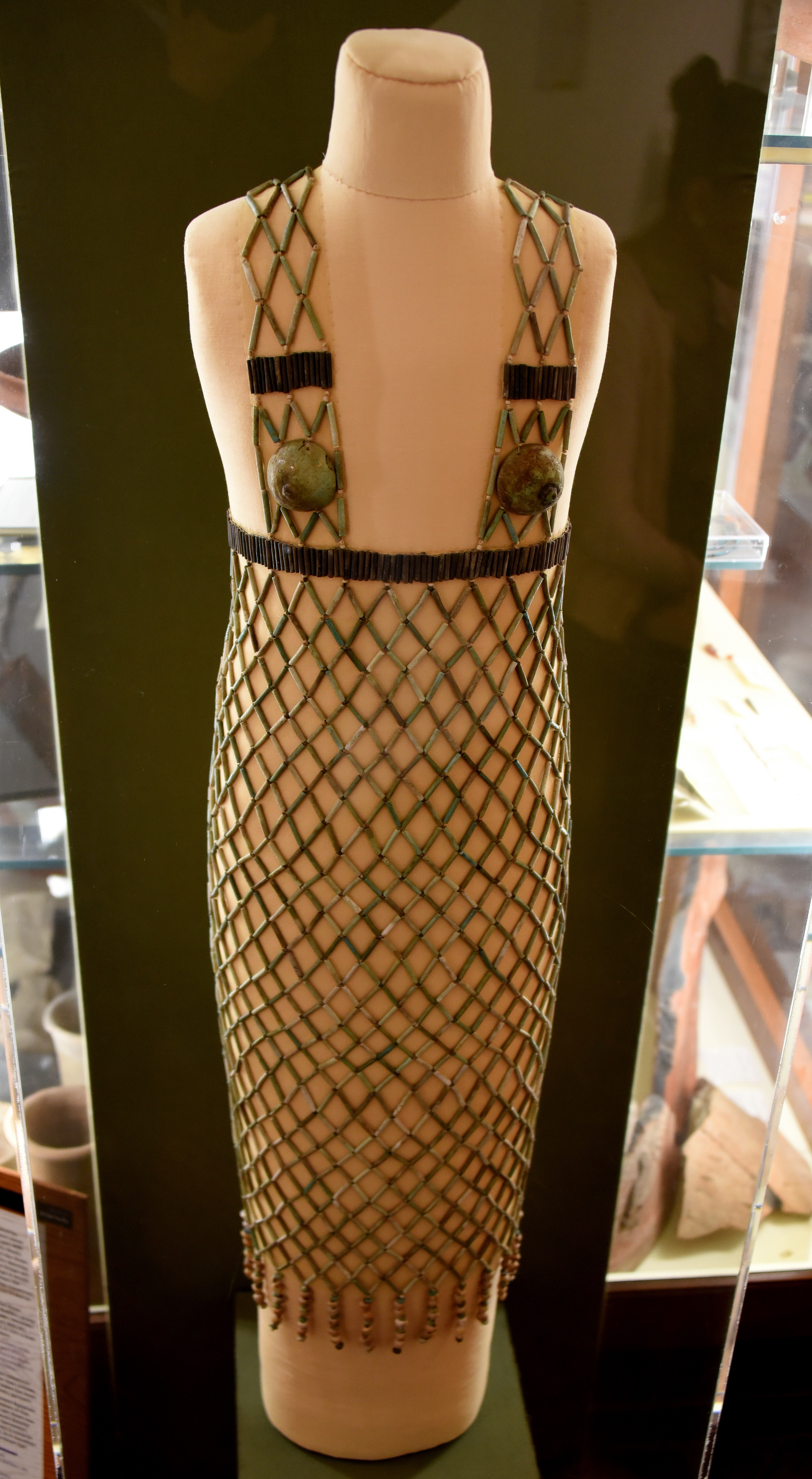
Network dress. Faience, blue and black cylinder beads, two breast caps and two strings of Mitra beads. 5th Dynasty. From burial 978 at Qau (Tjebu), Egypt. The Petrie Museum of Egyptian Archaeology, London

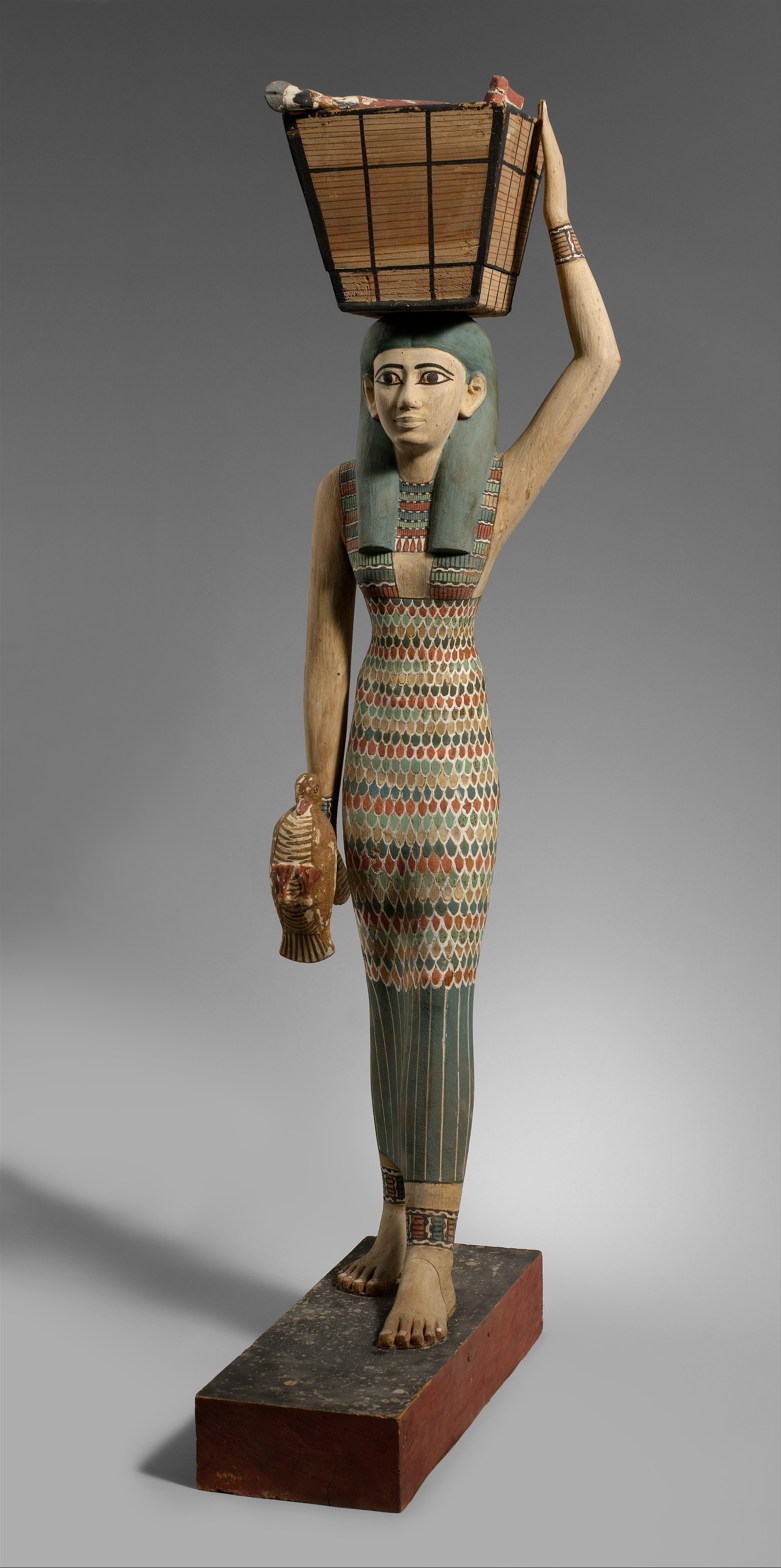
Egyptian woman in a kalasiris

Female statue with clothing, 2118 - 1980 BC, Museo Egizio (Turin, Italy)

During the Old, Middle and New Kingdom, ancient Egyptian women mostly wore a simple sheath dress called a kalasiris, which is shown to cover the breasts in statues, but in paintings and relief the single breast depicted in profile is exposed. Women's clothing in ancient Egypt was more conservative than men's clothing. The dresses were held up by one or two straps and were worn down to the ankle, while the upper edge could be worn above or below the breasts. The length of the dress denoted the social class of the wearer. Beading or feathers were also used as an embellishment on the dress. Over the dress, women had a choice of wearing shawls, capes, or robes. The shawl was a piece of fine linen cloth around 4 feet wide by 13 or 14 feet long, which was mostly worn pleated. Surviving dresses consist of a body made from a tube of material sewn up one side, supported not by straps but by a bodice with sleeves. In contrast to dresses shown in art, such linen garments tend to be baggy, and would conceal rather than reveal the body. It was made of linen, a material that tends to sag but is shown to hug the body with no sag.

Dancing girls at banquets often wore only a string of beads around their hips; the rattling of the beads as they swayed was perceived as erotic. Prostitutes were also sometimes depicted wearing nothing but a hip belt, necklaces, and arm rings.

== Children ==
Children of both sexes went naked, often until puberty or slightly beyond. Children of wealthy families sometimes wore necklaces and bracelets while otherwise unclothed. A characteristic children's hairstyle was the sidelock, a plait left on an otherwise shaved head, usually on the right.

== Wigs ==
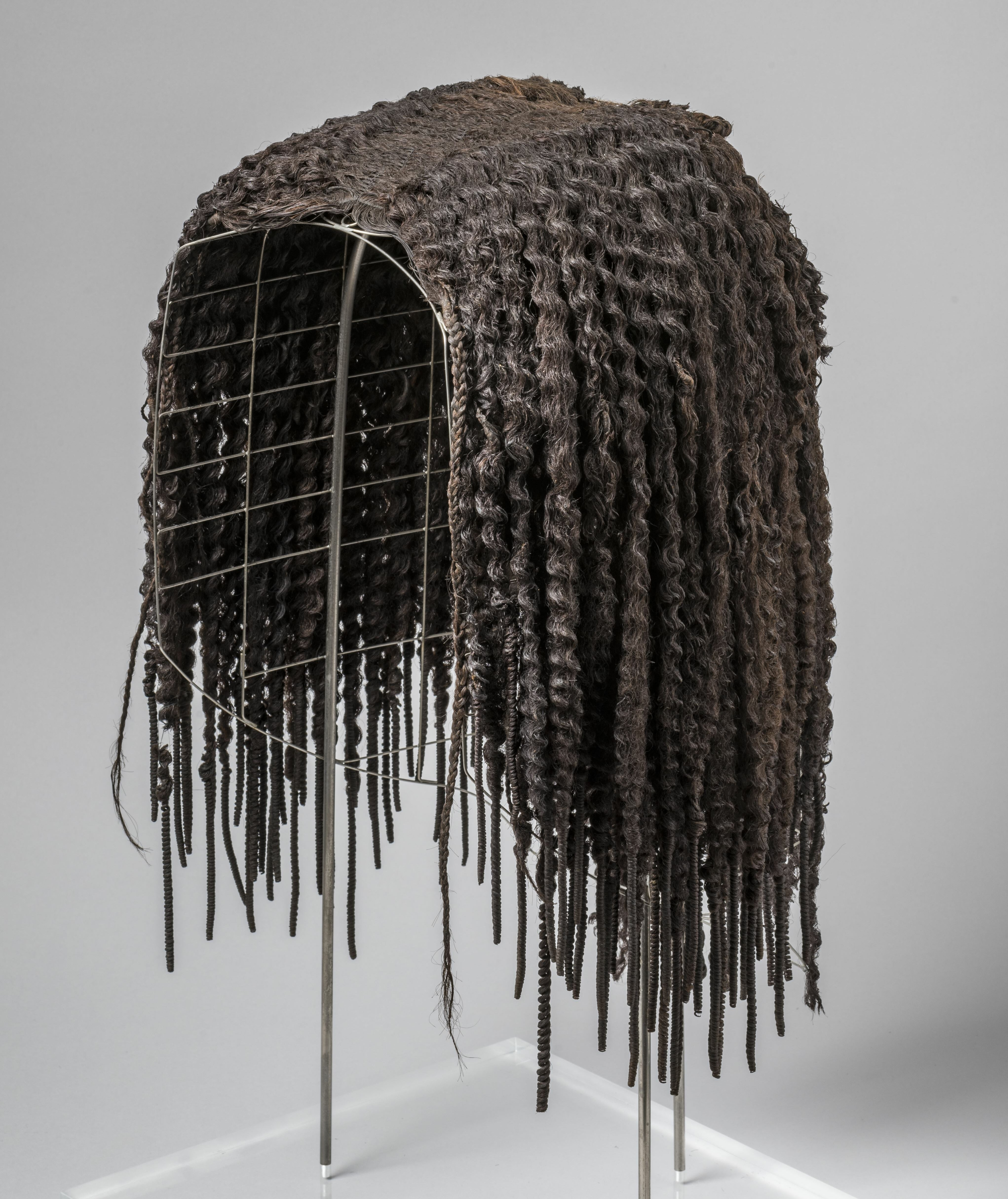
Merit's wig from the tomb of Kha and Merit, 14th century BCE

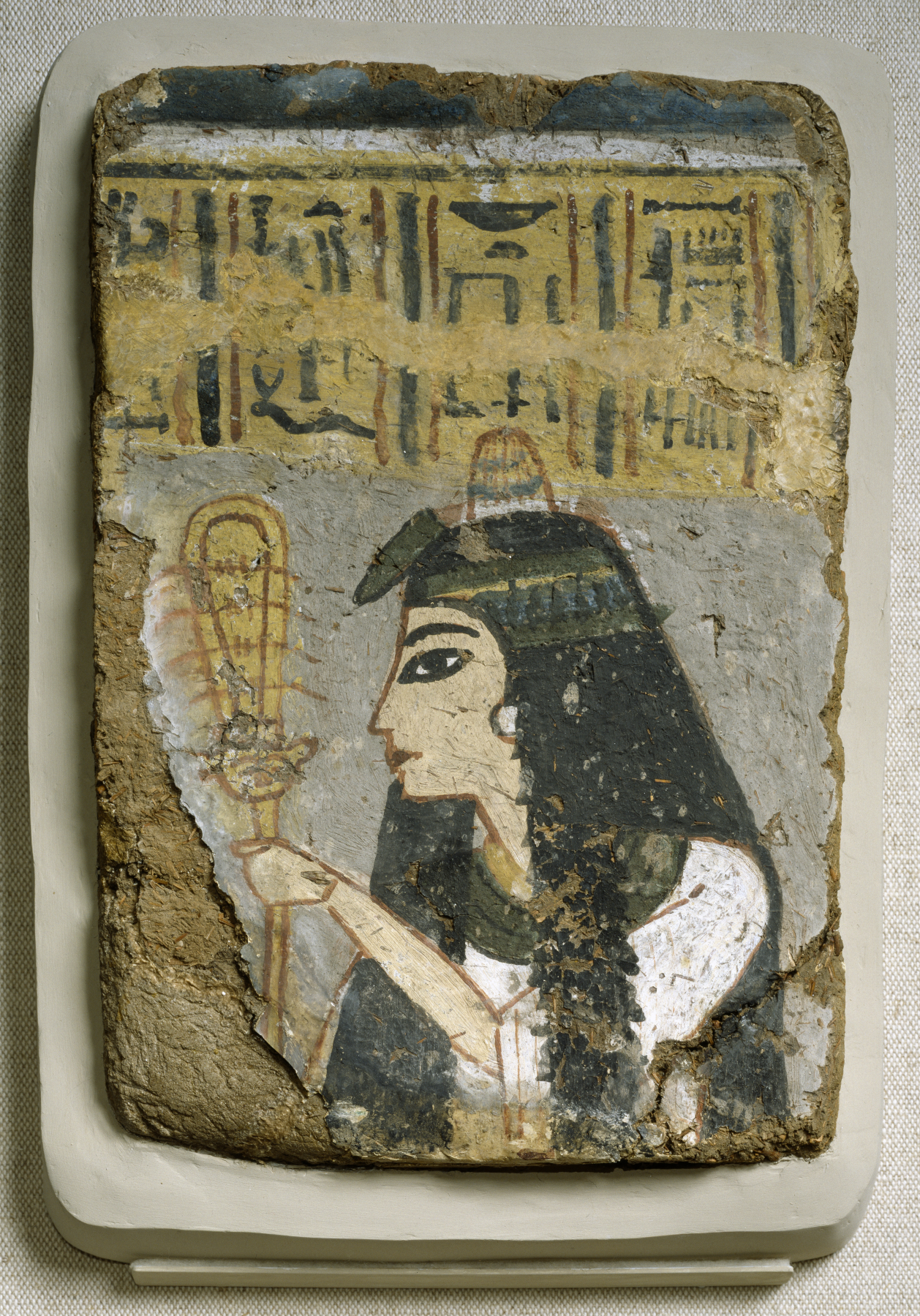
Painting of a woman with a wig and head cone, circa 1250–1200 BCE

Wigs were worn by the wealthy of both sexes. Made from human hair and sometimes supplemented with date palm fiber, they were often styled in tight curls and narrow braids. For special occasions, both men and women could top their wigs with cones of perfumed fat that would melt to release their fragrance and condition the hair.

== Jewelry ==
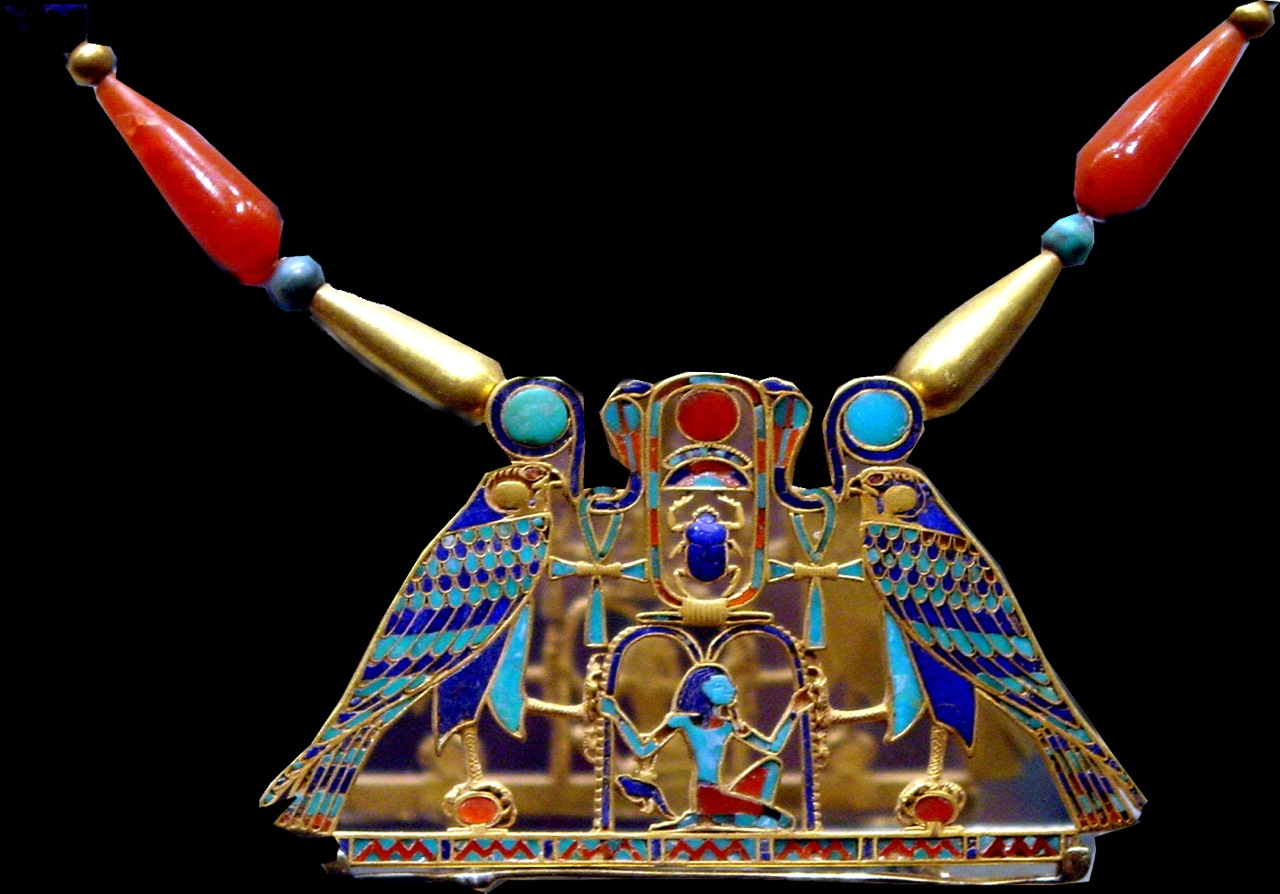
Pectoral of Senusret II, Metropolitan Museum of Art

Jewelry was very popular in ancient Egypt, no matter the social class. It was heavy and rather voluminous. The main reason for wearing jewelry is because of its aesthetic function. The Egyptians were quite soberly dressed in white linen fabrics, and jewelry offered a possibility for contrast. The Egyptian preference was towards the use of bright colors, lustrous stones and precious metals. Gold was won in large quantities in the eastern desert of Egypt, but also came from Nubia, that was an Egyptian colony for centuries.

On the other hand, silver was rare and was imported from Asia. Therefore, it was silver that was often considered more precious than gold. The eastern desert was also an important source for colorful semi-precious stones such as carnelian, amethyst and jasper. In the Sinai were turquoise mines, the deep blue lapis lazuli had to come from far away Afghanistan. Glass and faience (glaze over a core of stone or sand) were favorites to replace rocks because they could be produced in many colors.

The Egyptians became very skilled when making jewelry from turquoise, metals like gold and silver, and small beads. Both men and women adorned themselves with earrings, bracelets, rings, necklaces and neck collars that were brightly colored. Those who could not afford jewelry made from gold or other stones would make their jewelry from colored pottery beads.

One creation that was specific to ancient Egypt was the gorgerine, an assembly of metal discs worn on the chest, either over bare skin or over a shirt, and attached in the back.

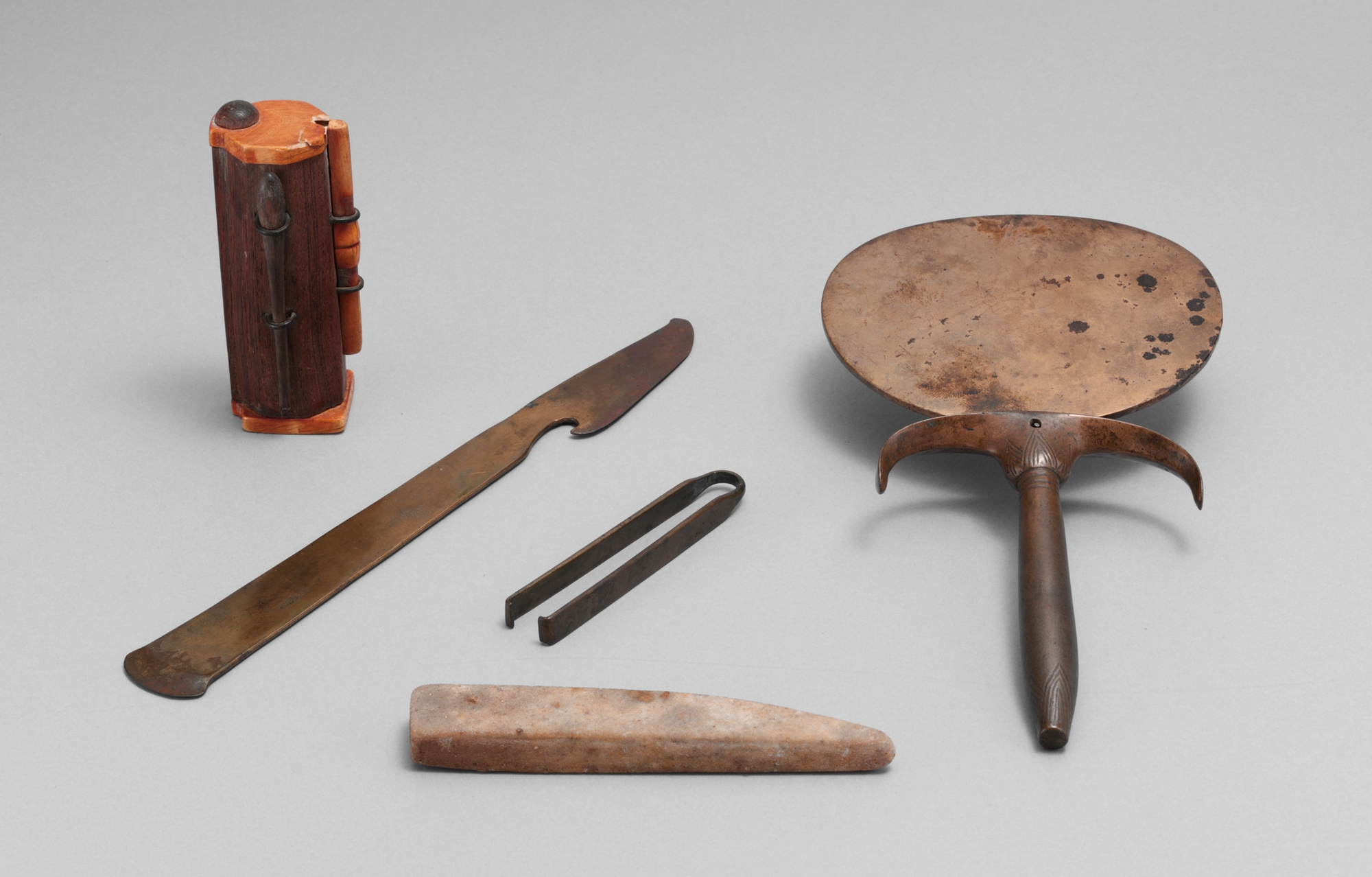
Ancient Egyptian cosmetic set from c. 1550–1458 BC, featuring, from left to right, a kohl tube, a razor, a pair of tweezers, a whetstone, and a mirror

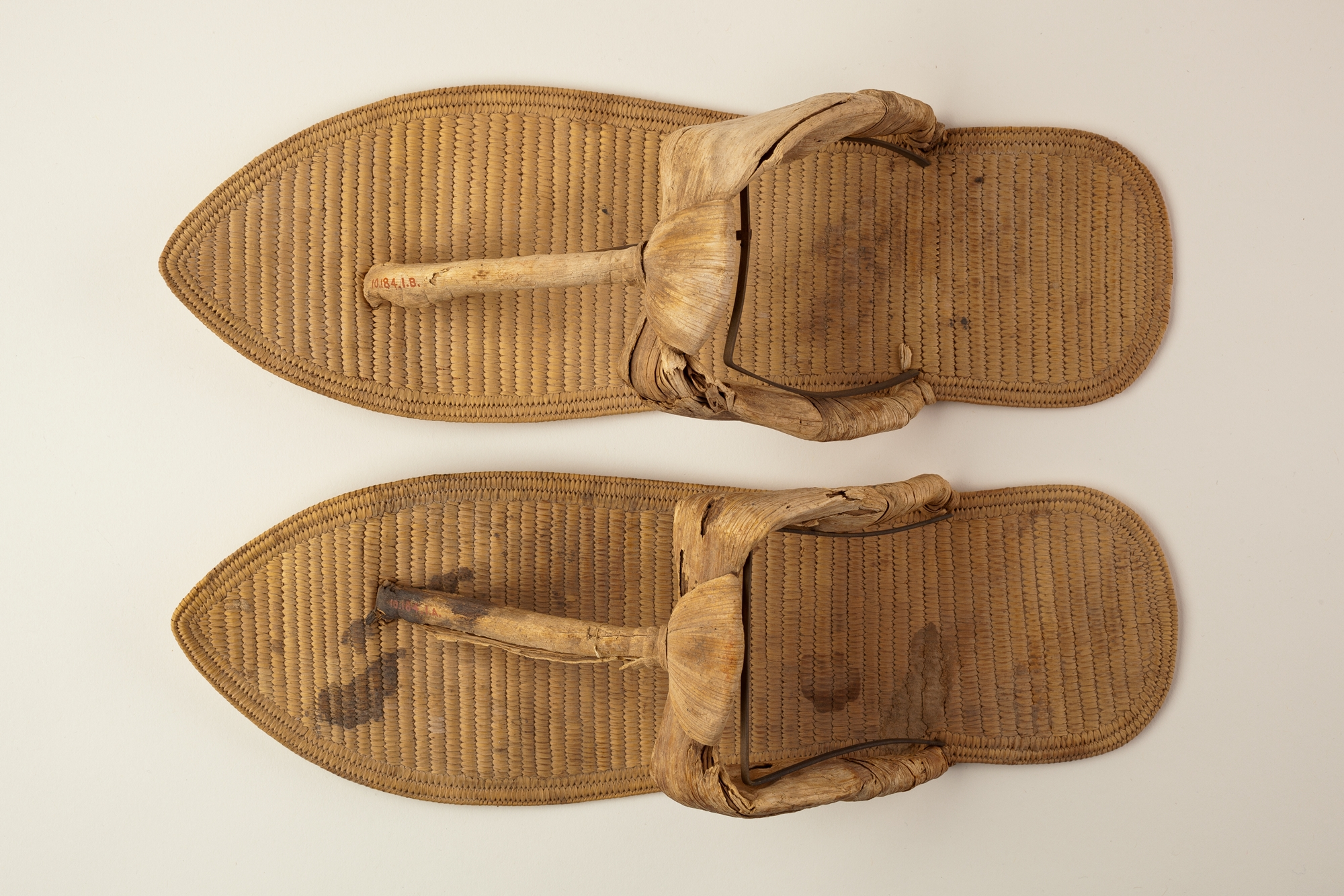
18th Dynasty sandals, circa 1390–1352 BCE

== Cosmetics ==
Embalming allowed the development of cosmetics and perfumes. The perfumes of Egypt were the most numerous, but also the most sought and the costliest of antiquity, which used them extensively. The Egyptians used makeup most of all the ancient people. Nails and hands were painted with henna.

Black kohl, which was used to mark eyes, was obtained from galena. Eye shadow was made from crushed malachite. Red, which was applied to lips, came from ochre. These products were mixed with animal fat to make them compact and to preserve them. Both men and women wore galena or malachite eyeliner to protect the eyes and enhance their beauty.

Findings were published by American Chemical Society in the journal Analytic Chemistry suggest that the use of lead in makeup was intentional. Findings suggest that the lead in combination with salts produced naturally by the body produce nitric oxide which boosts the immune system. It is believed that the production and result were intentional. The increase in immune productivity would help to prevent infections like conjunctivitis.

== Footwear ==
Footwear was the same for both sexes. It consisted of coiled sewn sandals of leatherwork, or for the priestly class, papyrus. Since Egyptians were usually barefoot, sandals were worn on special occasions or at times when their feet might get hurt.

== New Kingdom of Egypt ==
Women's fashions of this period were more elaborate than in any previous era. Both men and women in Egypt often shaved their heads to prevent lice and to reduce the time it took to maintain a full head of hair. Wigs were worn by both sexes to protect the scalp and for ceremonial purposes.

== See also ==
- Biblical clothing
- Clothing in ancient Rome
- Clothing in ancient Greece
- Clothing in the ancient world
