= Hedjhotep =

Ancient Egyptian deity

Name in hieroglyphs
T3 R4 t p A40

Hedjhotep (also Hedj-hotep from ḥḏ-ḥtp) was a minor ancient Egyptian deity, a god of fabrics and clothes and, to a lesser extent, of weaving and the deceased. Hedjhotep is sometimes described as a goddess rather than a god, holding a wadj-scepter and ankh sign. He possibly originated from the northern part of Middle Egypt.

The earliest attestations of Hedjhotep date back to the Twelfth Dynasty of the Middle Kingdom, when he appears in spells of the Coffin Texts including spells 779 and 908.

A cult center of Hedjhotep might have existed at the time east of the Faiyum in el Lahun. It is in nearby Harageh that archaeological excavations unearthed the only stele known to be dedicated explicitly to Hedjhotep, stele AEIN 1540, from the tomb of a man named Nebipu who held the titles of "libationer" and "keeper of clothing". The onomastic of individuals who lived in the region of Heracleopolis Magna during the Middle Kingdom indicates that Hedjhotep then benefitted from a growing cult and dedicated priesthood. In spite of this, Hedjhotep does not seem to have been honoured by dedicated priests in subsequent periods of Ancient Egyptian history, during which he appears only sporadically on sarcophagi and liturgical contexts centered on rituals devoted to the king.

In parallel with these developments, the New Kingdom sees Hedjhotep being given medicinal roles. He is invoked with Shezmu, the god of the preparation of unguents, in the treatment of headache and stomach-ache, and in the making of amulets where he is in charge of their cords. Another papyrus of the same time period presents Hedjhotep as a dichotomy: beneficial as a god of clothing but harmful as a deity who committed an offence against Montu, possibly running away with one of his divine wives or having forced a sexual relation on him similar to what happens in "The Contendings of Horus and Seth". From this time onwards, Hedjhotep is often associated with a goddess of weaving named Tayt as well as with Renenutet.

Hedjhotep is more frequently honoured during the Late Period, Ptolemaic Kingdom and Roman period, when he is shown replacing Horus as the son of Isis in scenes of cloth-offerings. The latest period sees the development of a syncretism with the god Shu, making of Hedjhotep a son of Ra and the first to have dressed the naked, having invented clothing. Hedjhotep nonetheless remains primarily the god who creates the clothes of the king, the gods and the deceased, thereby stimulating their resurrection.
