= Nemes =

Formal headcloth worn by the kings of Ancient Egypt

- Nemes, symbolizing the Pharaoh’s power, both in life and death

Details
- Country: Egypt
- Material: Linen

T34 m s V6
Nemes, striped head cloth
(crown as
determinative)

in hieroglyphs

n T34 m s V6
Nemes
in hieroglyphs

Nemes (English: /ˈnɛmɛs/) were pieces of striped head cloth worn by pharaohs in ancient Egypt. It covered the whole crown and behind of the head and nape of the neck (sometimes also extending a little way down the back) and had lappets, two large flaps which hung down behind the ears and in front of both shoulders. It was sometimes combined with the double crown, as it is on the statues of Ramesses II at Abu Simbel.

== Modern recreations ==
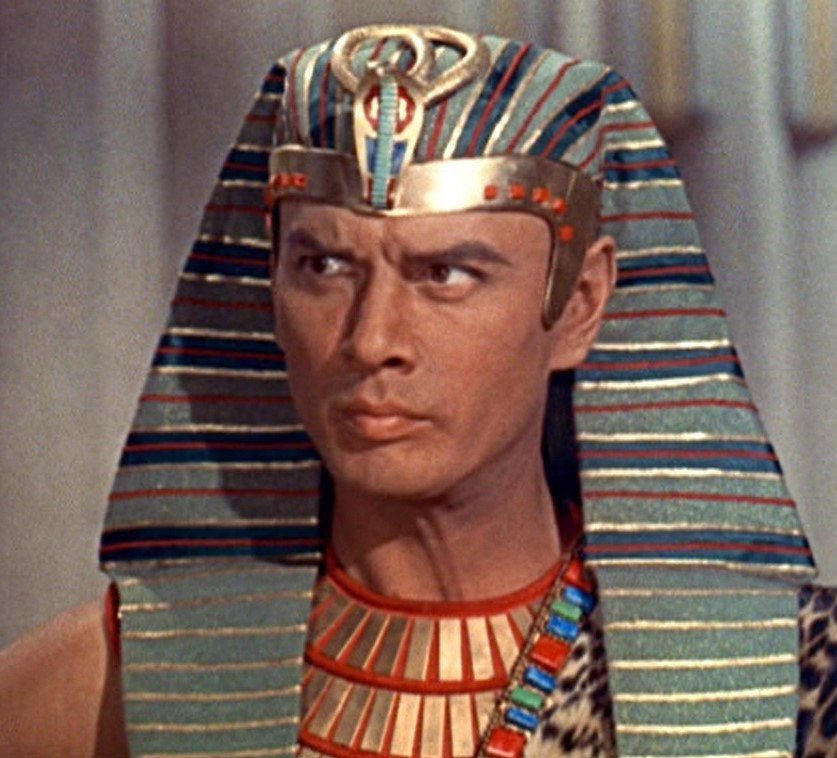
Yul Brynner wearing a nemes as Ramesses II in The Ten Commandments

The occult society "The Hermetic Order of the Golden Dawn" used headwear similar to ancient Egyptian nemes, which they spelled "nemyss", as part of their "traditional ceremonial garb".

== Gallery ==
Modern drawing of a pharaoh with a nemes

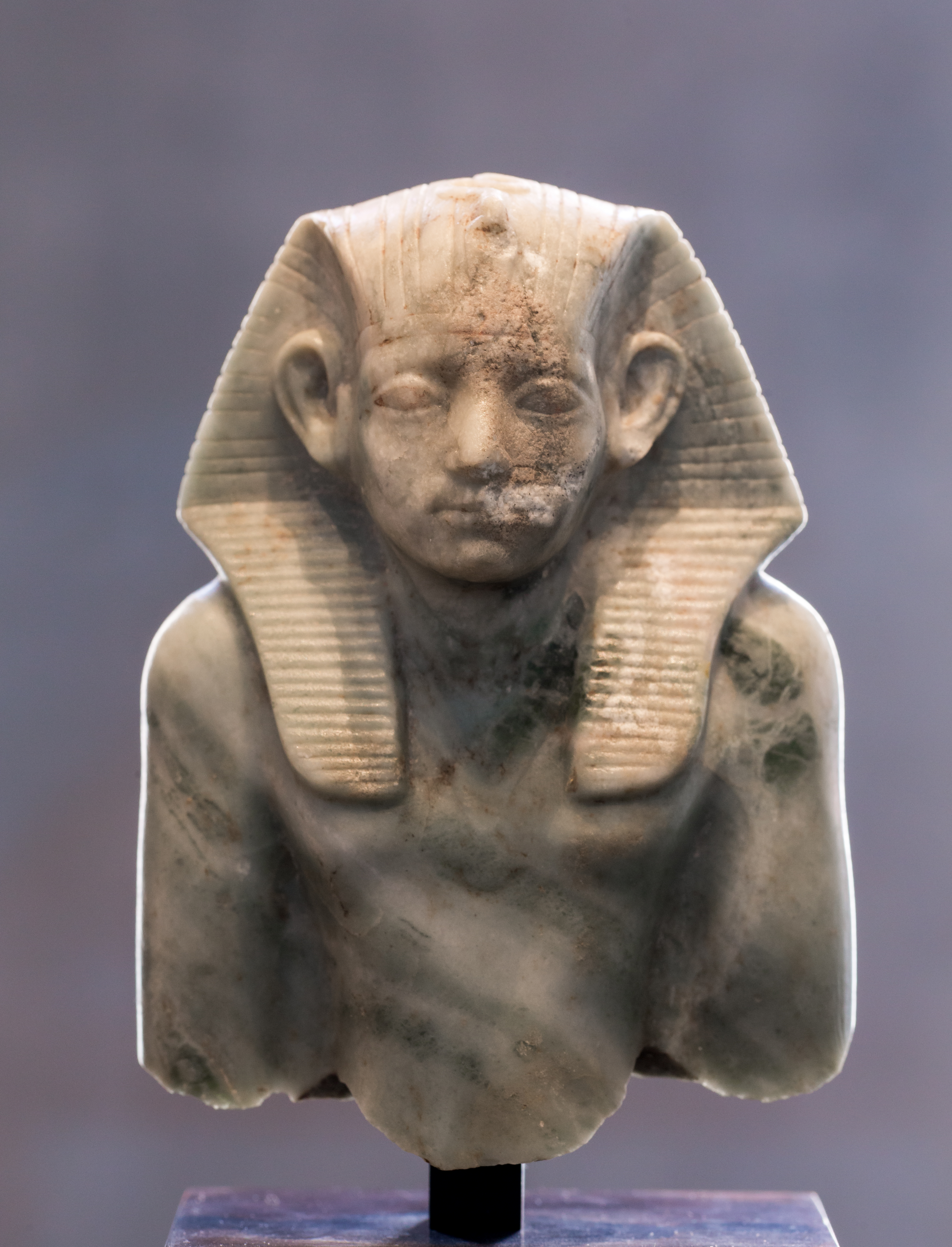
Upper part of portrait statuette of pharaoh Amenemhat III, wearing a nemes, c. 1853 – c. 1805 BCE

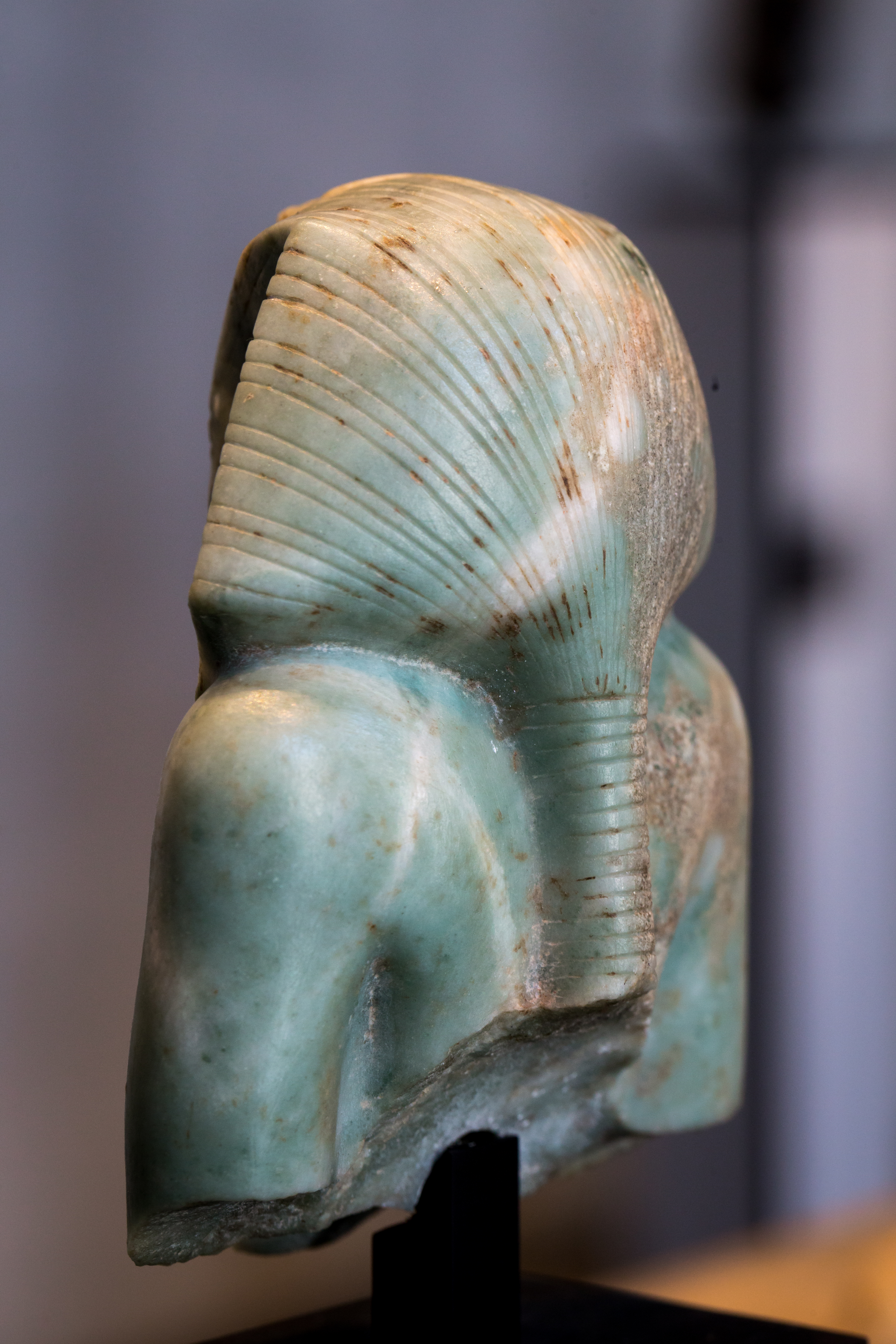
The back and upper part of portrait statuette of pharaoh Amenemhat III, wearing a nemes, c. 1853 – c. 1805 BCE

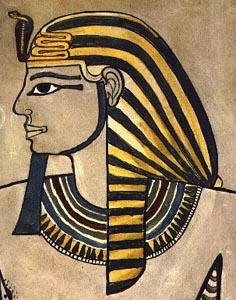
Amenhotep II wearing a nemes, KV35, Valley of the Kings c. 1427 – c. 1401 BCE

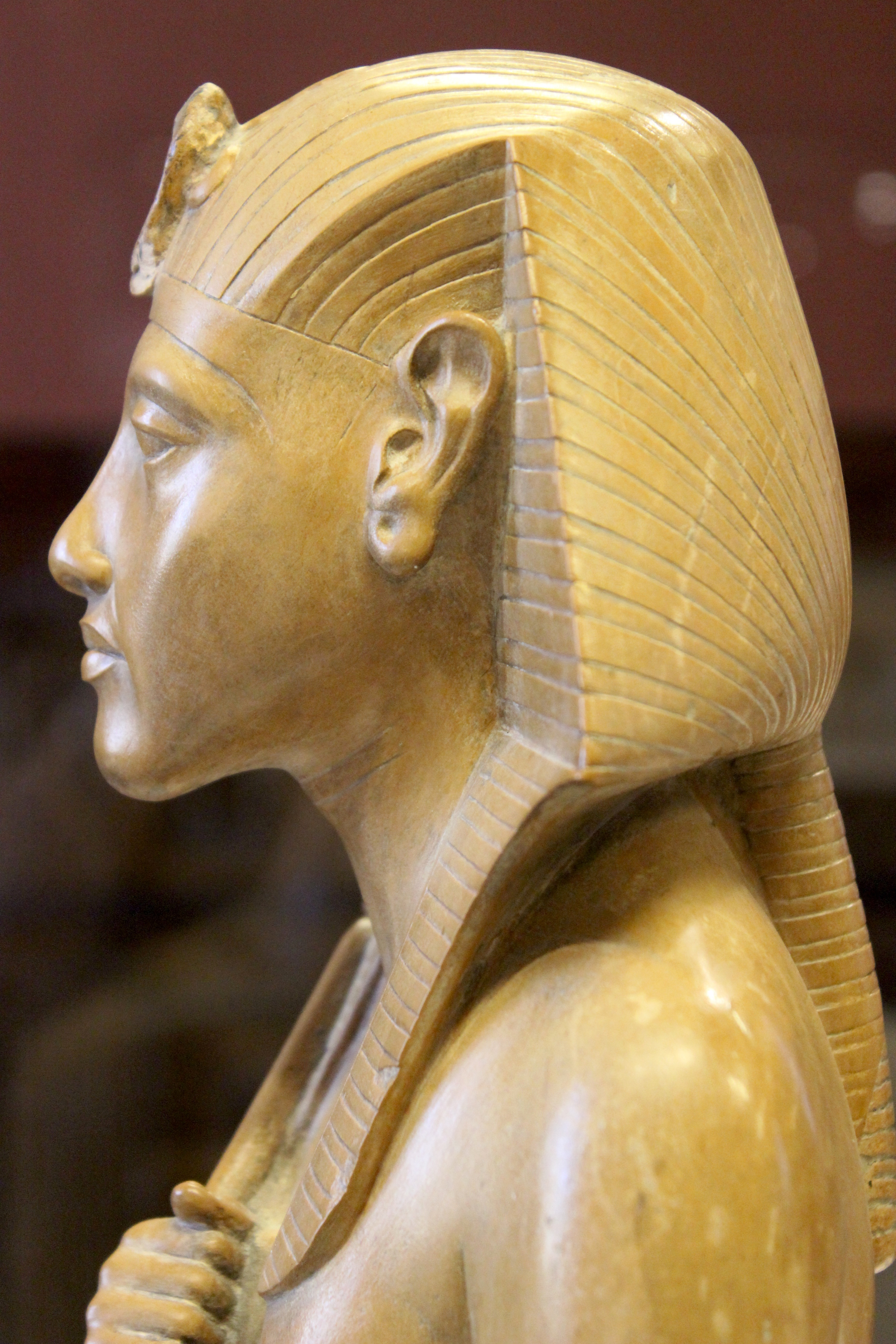
Profile of a statuette of Akhenaten wearing a nemes, c. 1351 – c. 1332 BCE

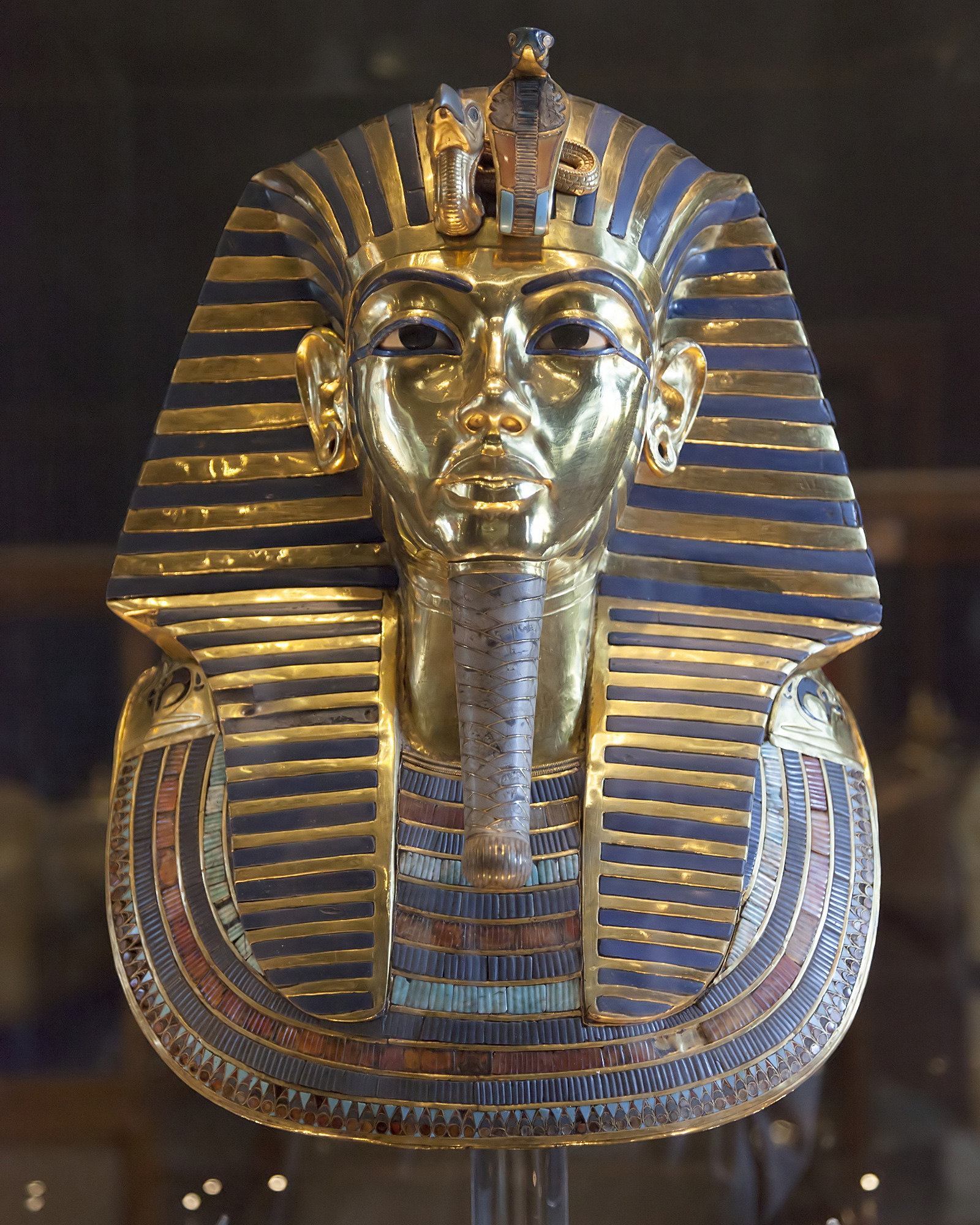
The golden mask from the mummy of Tutankhamun wearing the nemes, c. 1323 BCE

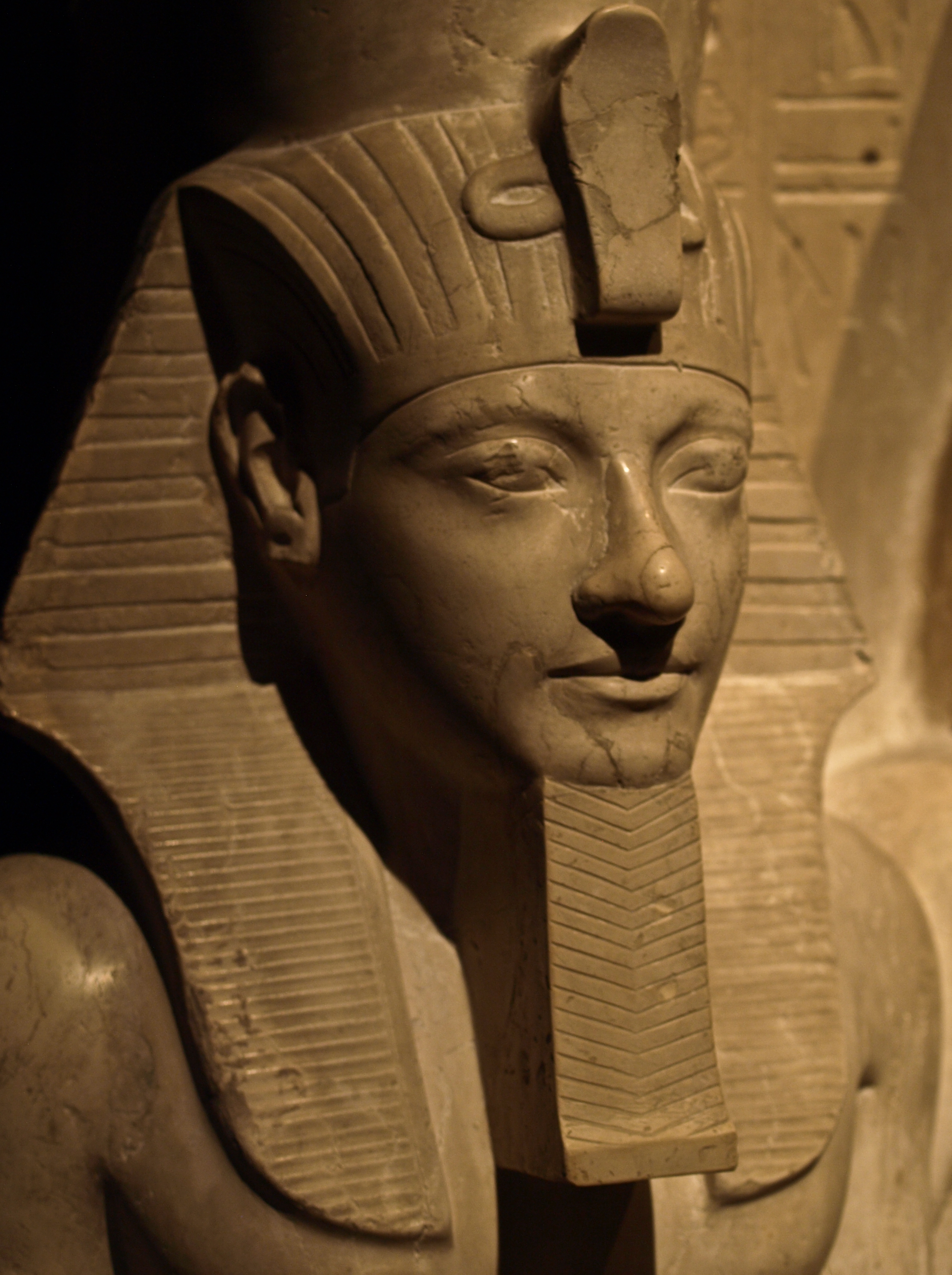
Upper part of a statuette of Horemheb wearing a nemes, c. 1319 – c. 1292 BCE

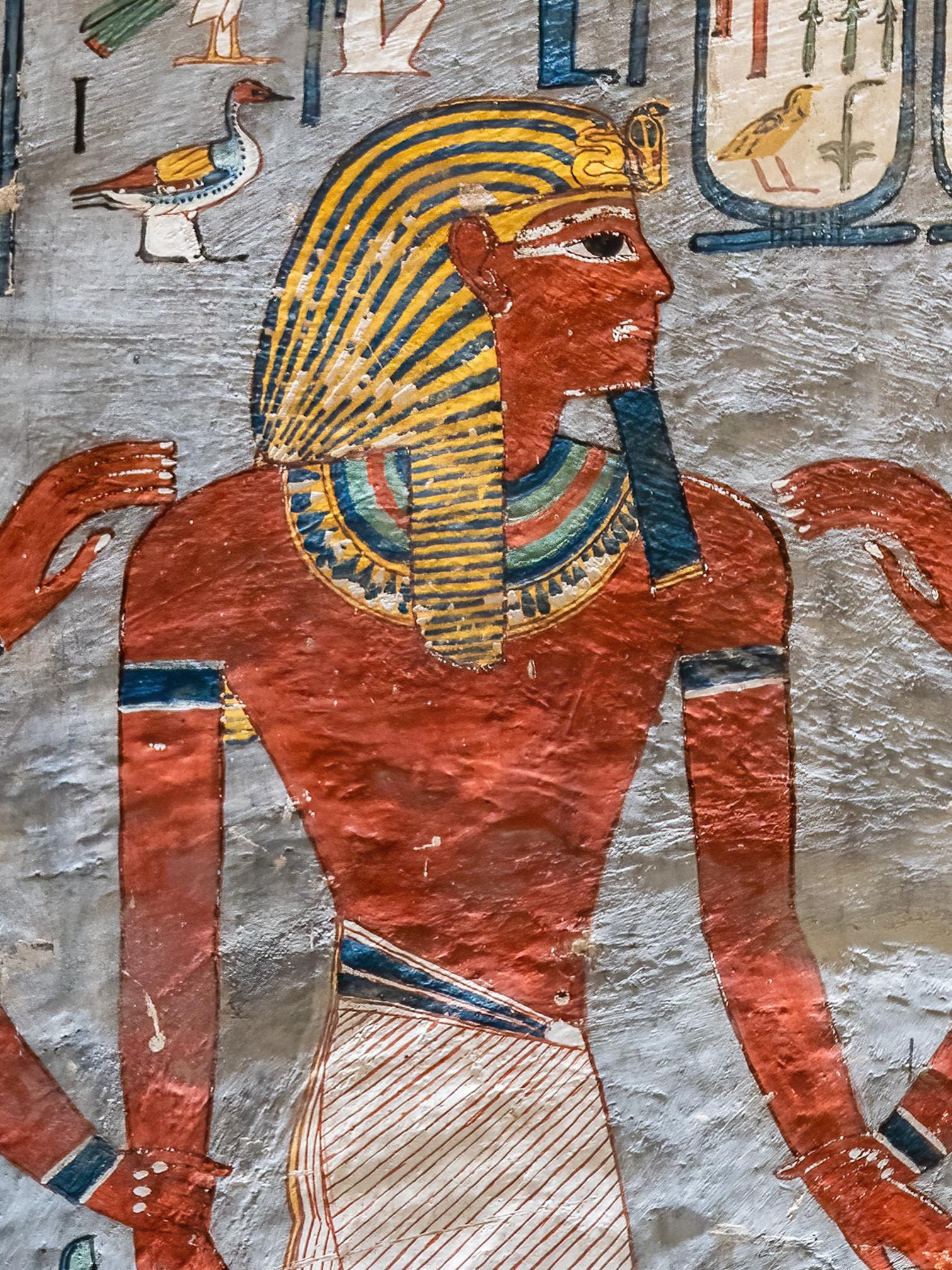
Ramesses I wearing a nemes, KV16, Valley of the Kings c. 1292 – c. 1290 BCE

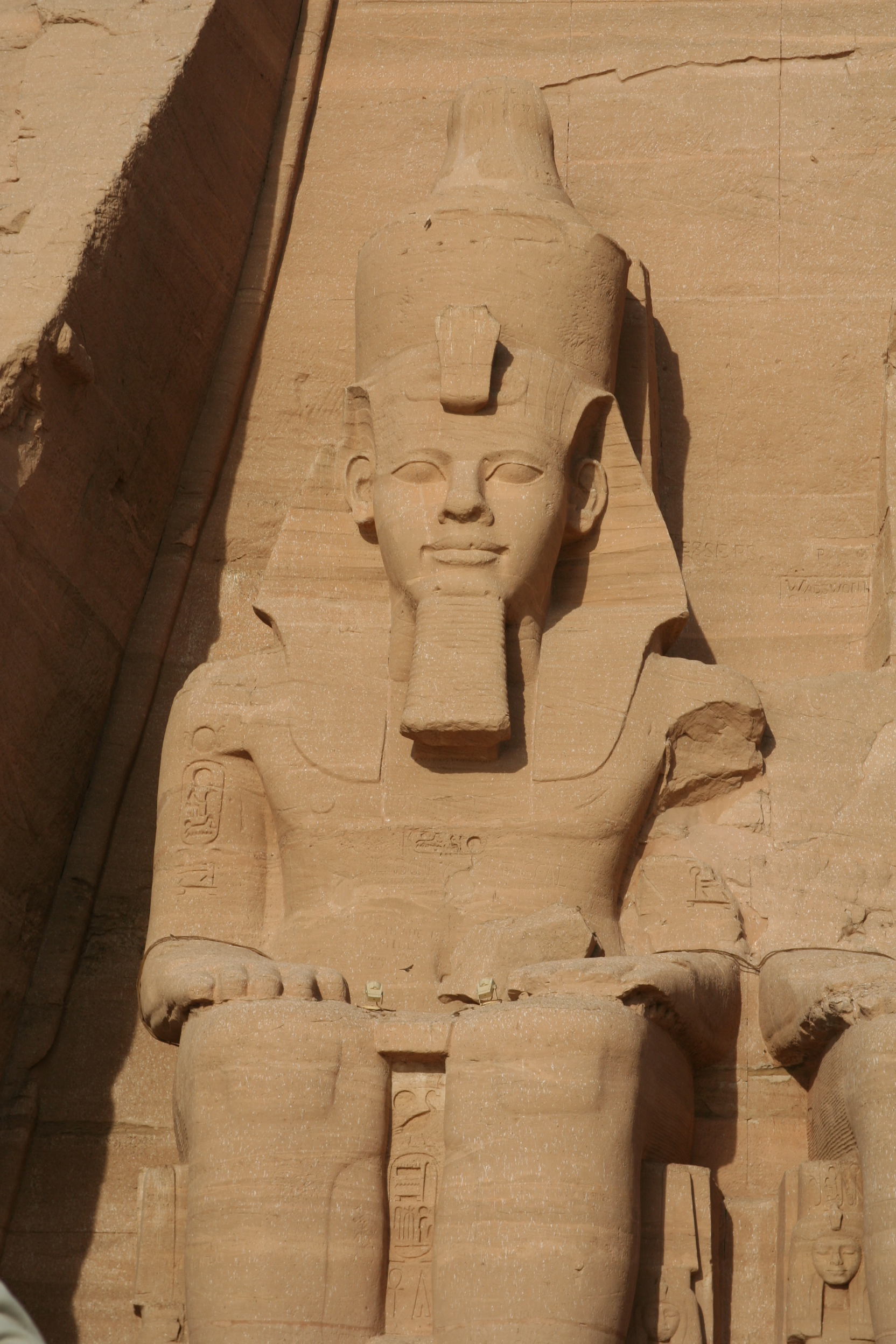
Statue at Abu Simbel of Ramesses II wearing the pschent atop a nemes

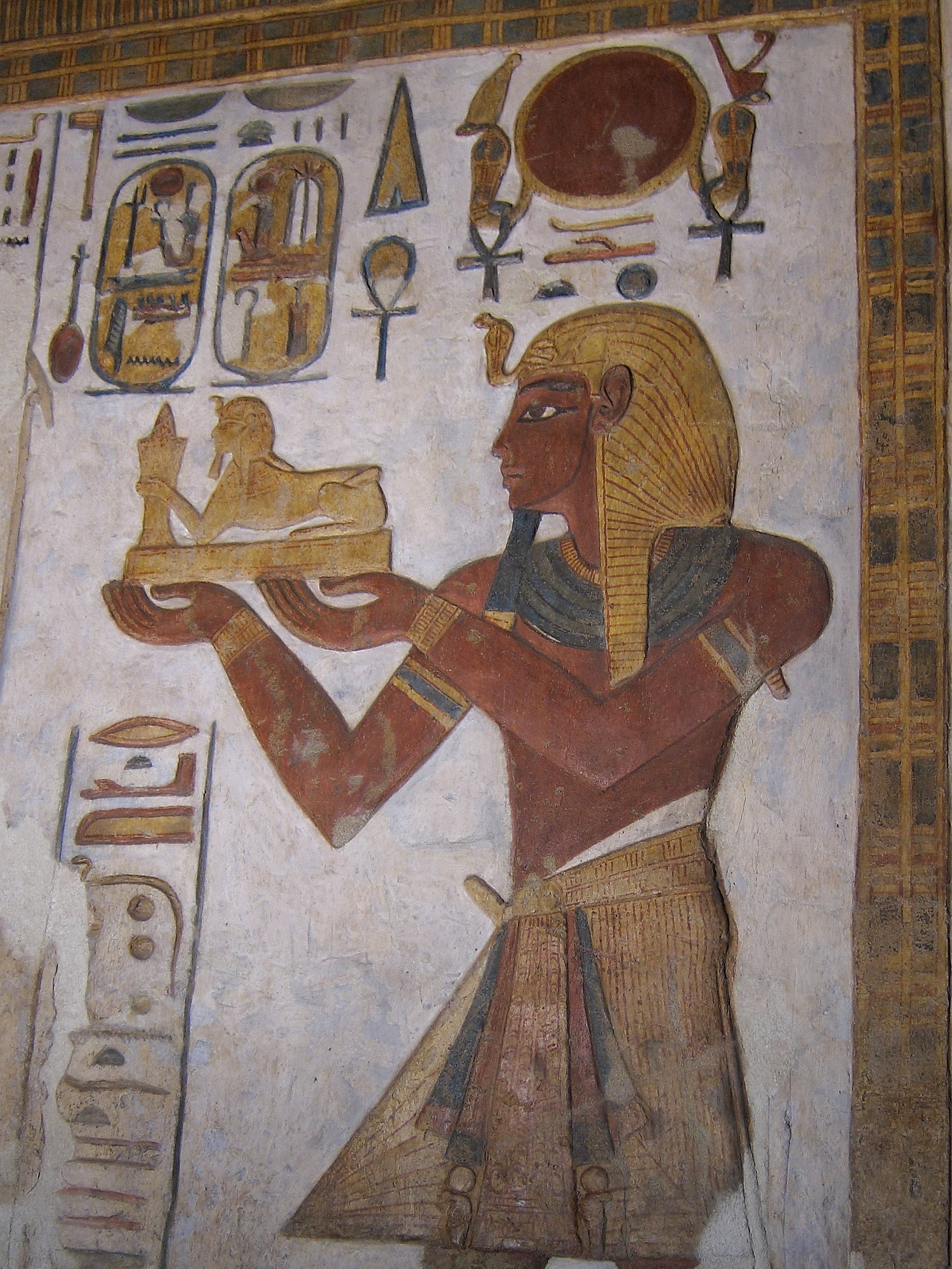
Relief from the Sanctuary of Khonsu Temple depicting Rameses III wearing a nemes

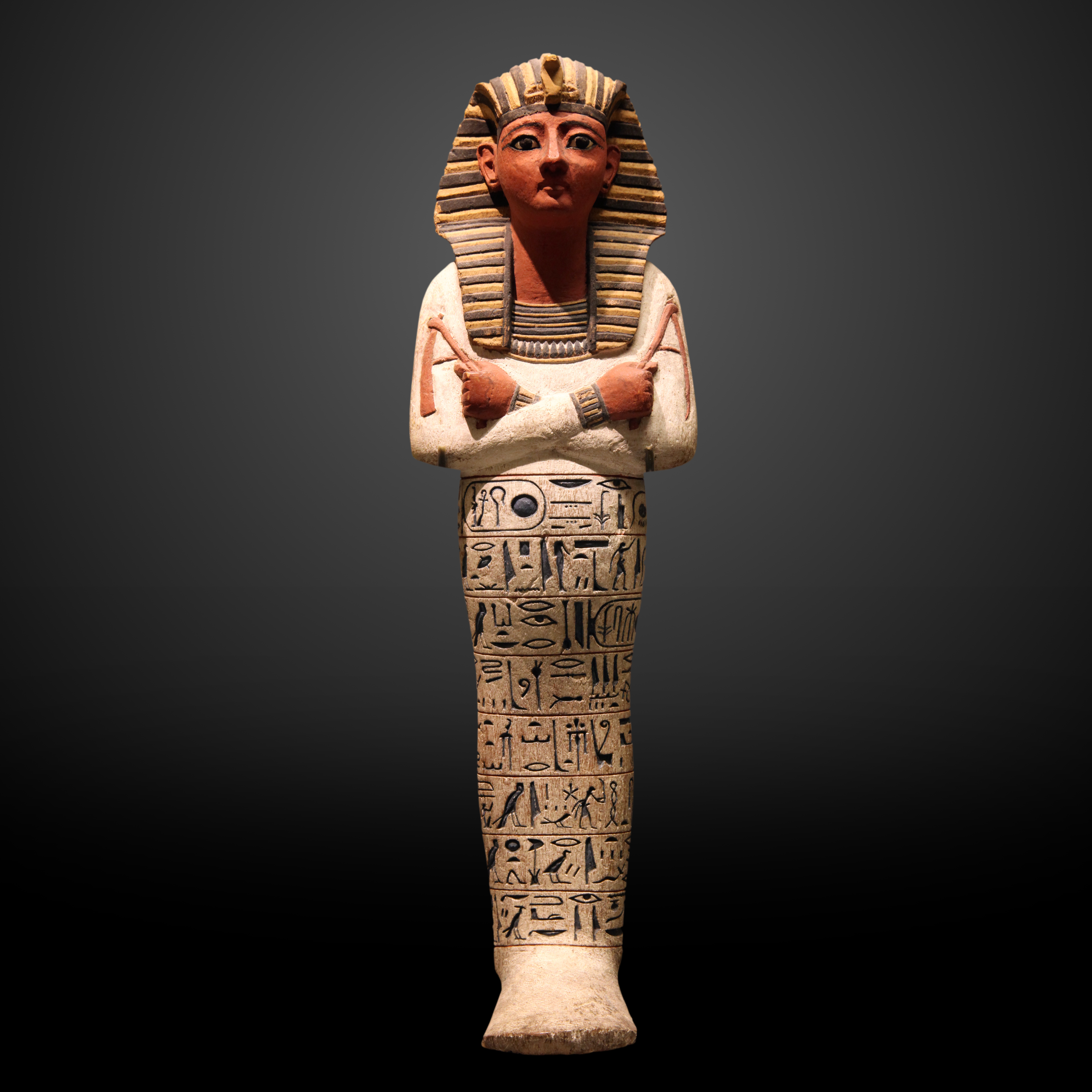
Ushabti of Ramses IV with a nemes, c. 1143 – c. 1136 BCE

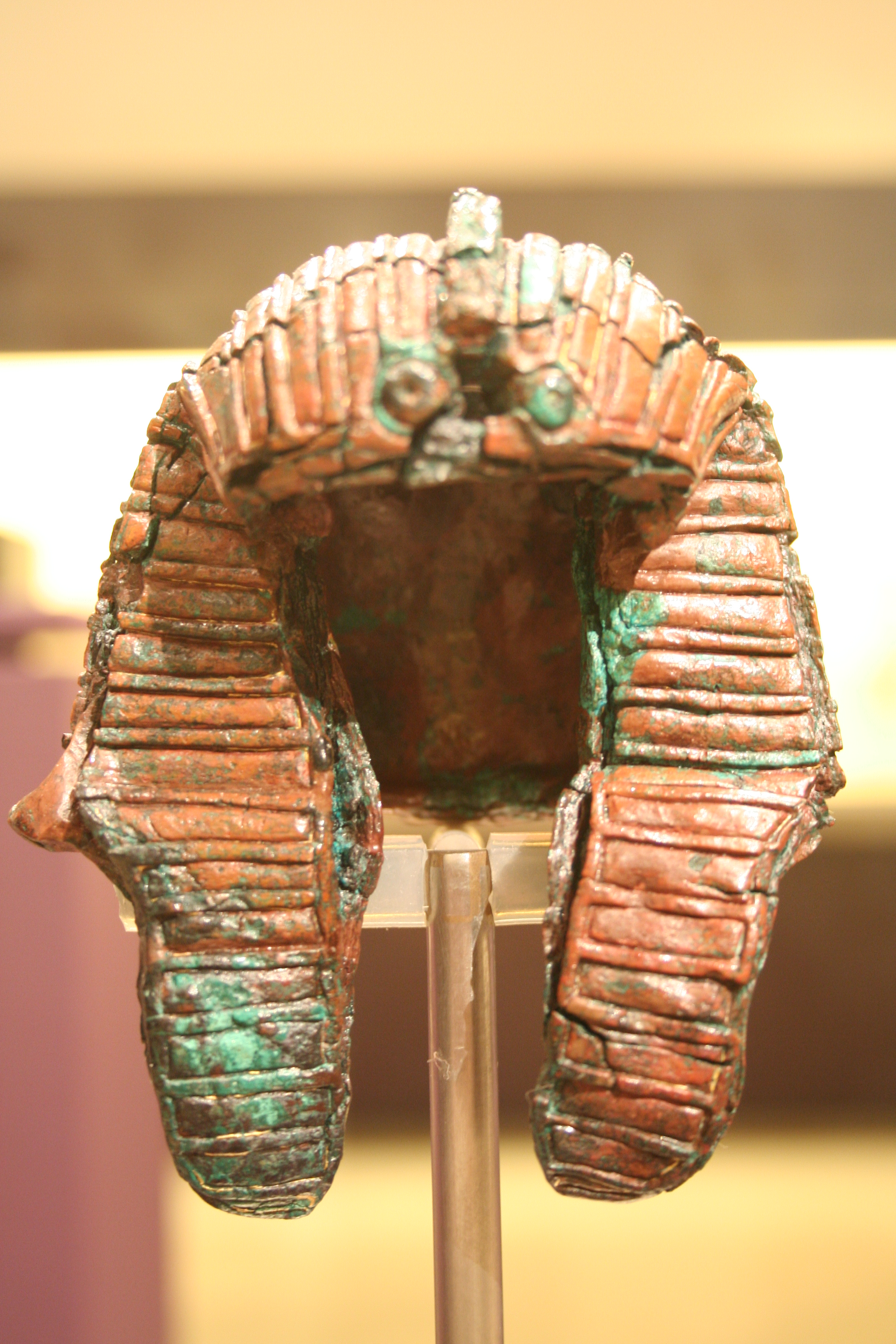
Miniature metal nemes

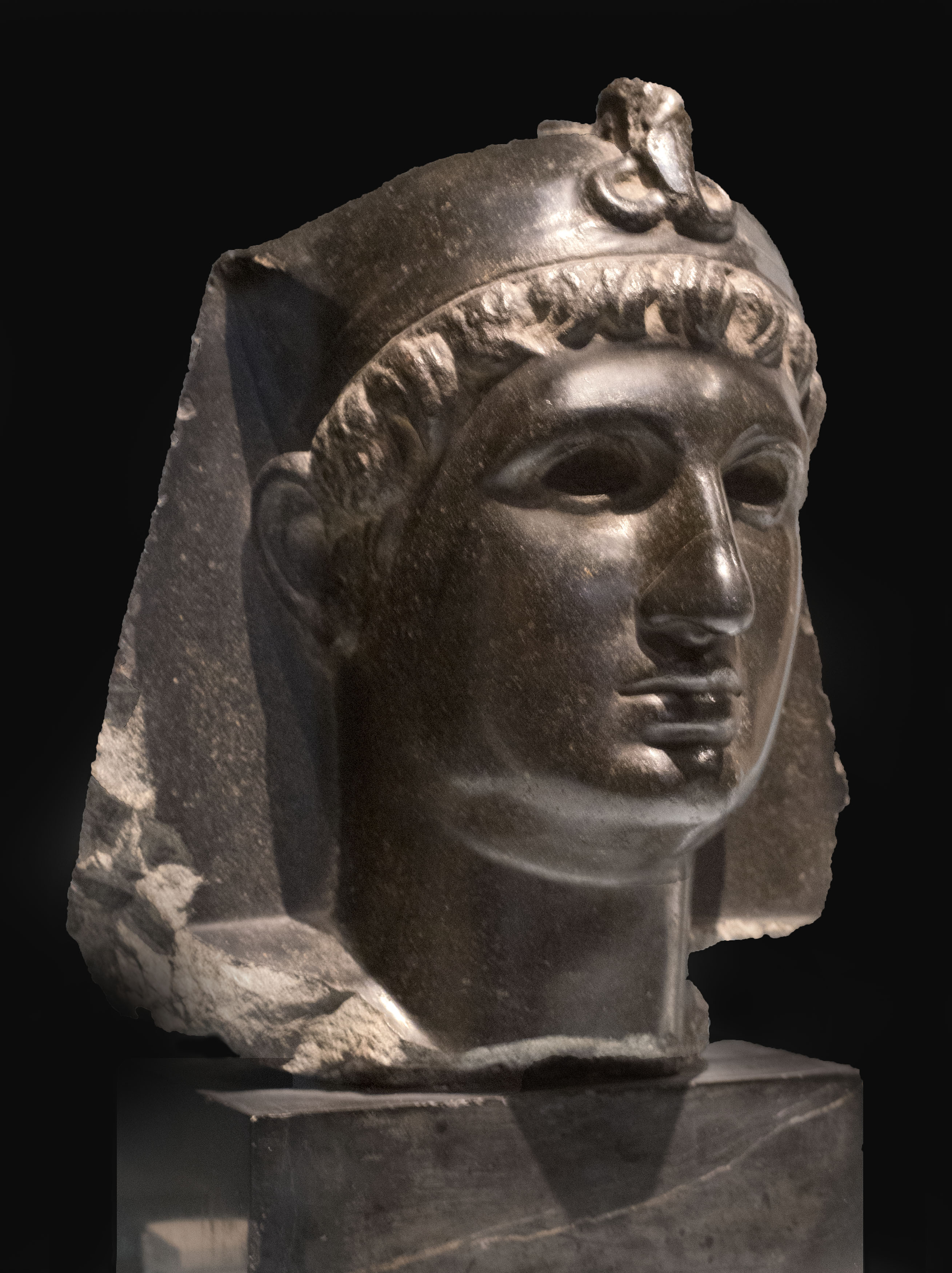
CE 1st-century Roman emperor as pharaoh (Louvre)

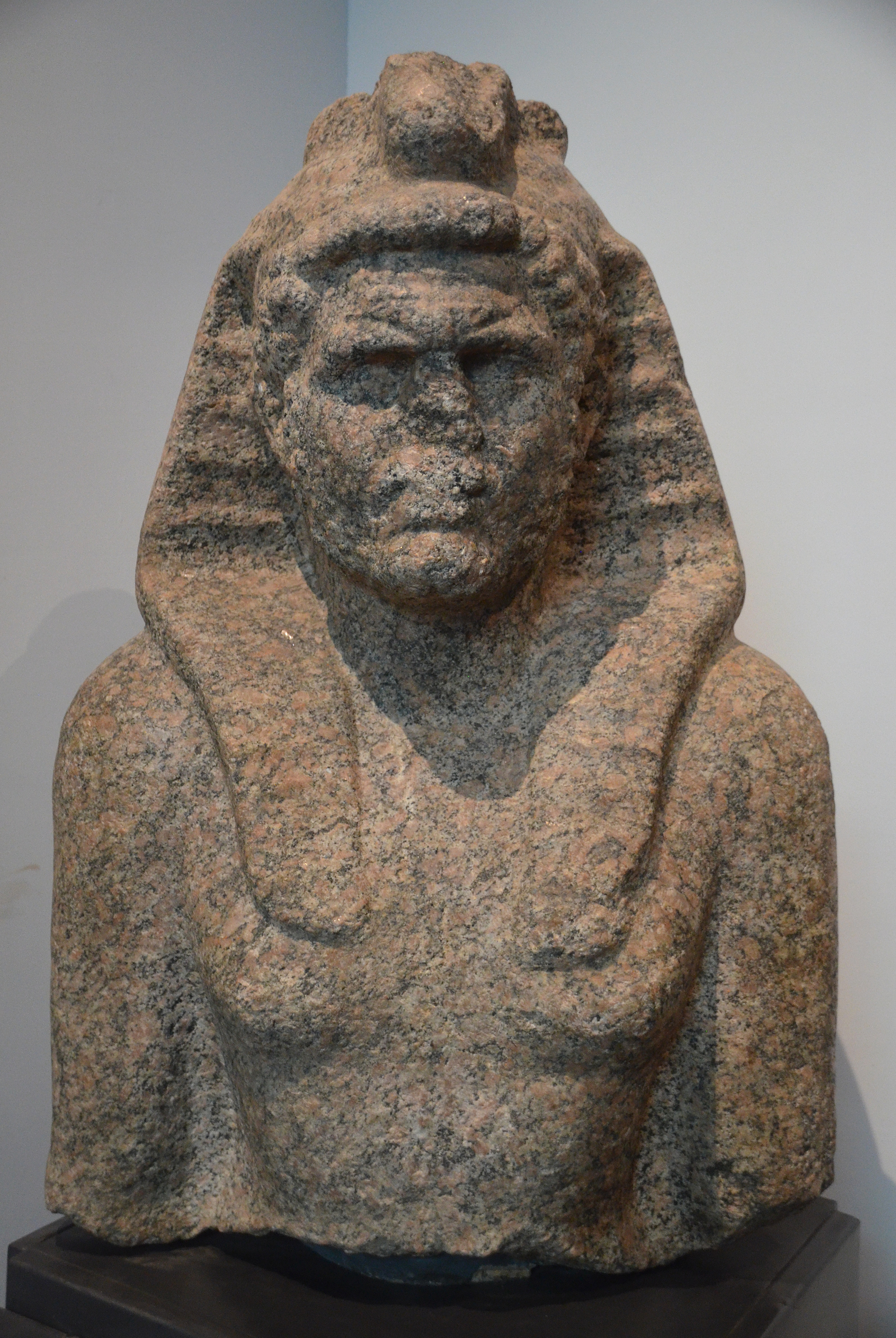
Caracalla (r. 198–217) as pharaoh (Alexandria National Museum)

== See also ==
- Deshret
- Hedjet
- Pschent (double crown)
- Clothing in ancient Egypt
