= Tarrana =

Aṭ-Ṭarrānah الطرانة
- Town
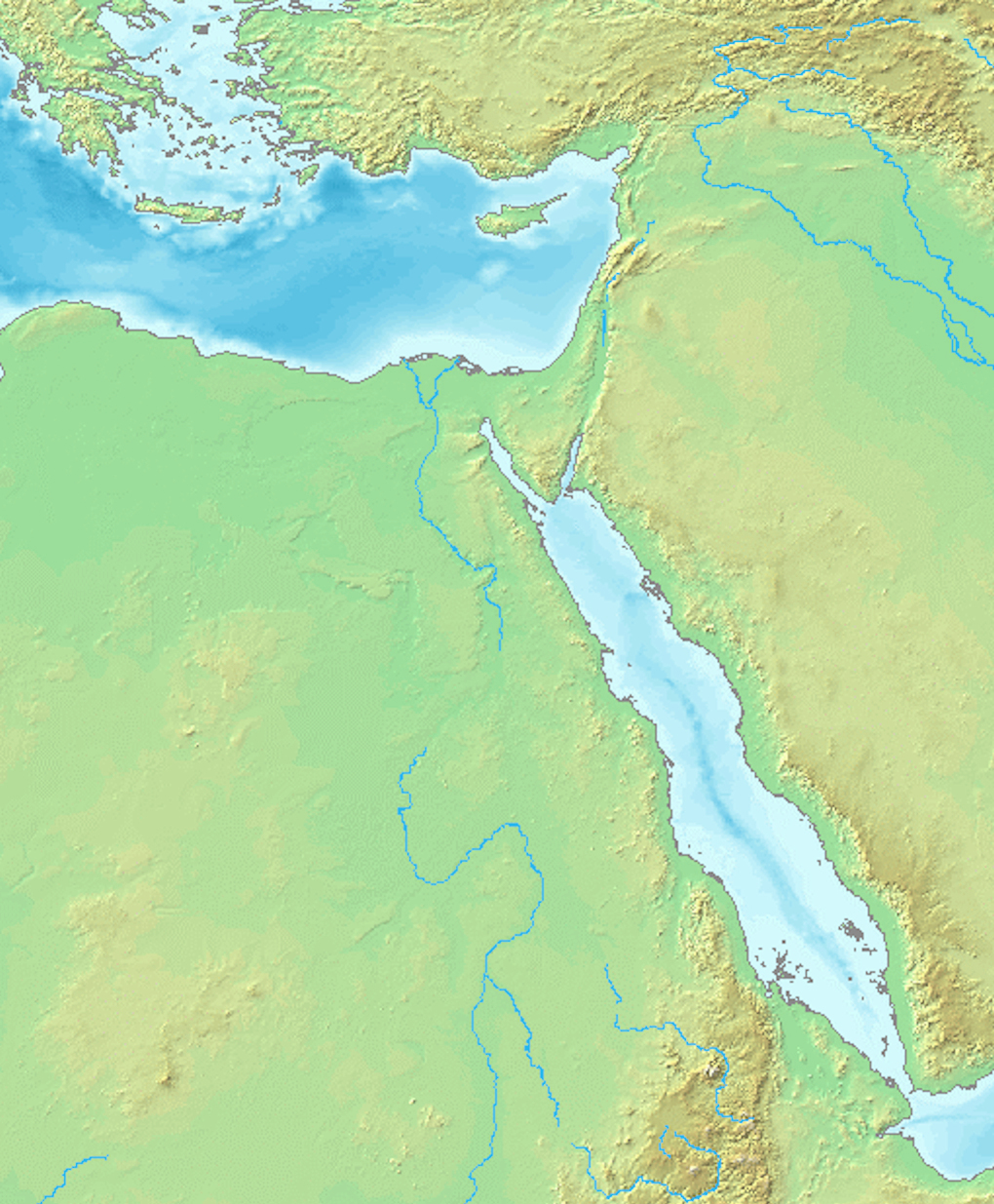
- Location in Egypt Aṭ-Ṭarrānah (Egypt) Aṭ-Ṭarrānah (Northeast Africa)
- Coordinates: 30.43518°N 30.83722°E
- Country: Egypt
- Governorate: Monufia Governorate
- Elevation: 12 m (39 ft)
- Time zone: UTC+2 (EET)
  - Summer (DST): UTC+3 (EEST)

Tarrana (Arabic: الطرانة Aṭ-Ṭarrānah, Coptic: ⲧⲉⲣⲉⲛⲟⲩⲑⲓ Terenouthi), known in classical antiquity as Terenouthis (Ancient Greek: Τερενοῦθις), is a town that is currently referred to as Monufia Governorate of Egypt. This site is located in the western Nile Delta, circa 70 km north-west of Cairo, between the southern prehistoric site of Merimde Beni-salame and the northern town of Kom el-Hisn. The modern name for the necropolitain ancient city of Ternouthis (El-Tarrana) is Kom Abou Billou. Tarrana was once a popular commercial center, and housed a diverse demographic that erupted during the Graeco-Roman Period (332 BC -395 AD) and the establishment of the Ptolemaic Period.

== Names ==
Tarrana was known to the ancient Egyptians as Mefket, meaning "turquoise" in Egyptian, itself an epithet of the goddess Hathor who was object of local veneration as "Hathor, Mistress of Turquoises". It was during the Graeco-Roman period that the town became known as Terenuthis, from the Egyptian *Ta-Renenût ("the domain of the goddess Renenutet") which in turn became the Coptic Terenouti, as well as Tarrana or Tarana, the modern town. The toponym Kom Abu Billo (or Kom Abu Bello) refers to a small modern village lying on Terenuthis’ necropolis, in the northwestern part of the whole site; it probably takes the name from the ancient temple of Apollo that once stood here.

== Geography ==
The modern town of El-Tarrana is on the Rosetta branch of the Nile, on the fringes of the Libyan Desert. The ancient necropolis of Kom Abu Billo is a short distance west of El-Tarrana, and is now bisected by the El-Nasseri Canal, a 40-meter-wide irrigation canal. This site is located at the edge of the western desert, in between the railroads of El-Khatatba and Kafr Dawud, also located northwest of Cairo. According to Hooper, the excavation of this site spanned about 25 meters east to west and 20 meters north to south, totaling to about 500 meters in all.

== Excavations ==
The site was first excavated in 1887–88 by Francis Llewellyn Griffith, who led a team on the rediscovery of the temple of Hathor, then again in 1935 by an expedition organized by the University of Michigan.The second excavation of the site was led by University of Michigan's Enoch E. Peterson, who contracted local professional Qufti foremen that were part of the team that originally trained under Sir William Flinders to properly conduct archaeological excavations. These men supervised hundreds of local workers to conduct the excavation for thirty five days to clear three key areas of the cemetery. The most consistent excavation campaign was led by the Egyptian Antiquities Organization, and took place between 1969 and 1974 due to the imminent construction of a canal which would have crossed the site. Nowadays, Terenuthis is poorly preserved partly because of these extensive excavations, partly due to the enlargement of the modern city of Tarrana and its crops. Since 2012, the site is explored by a mission of the Institut Français d'Archéologie Orientale.

=== Findings ===
The third test trench dug by the team was located on the eastern edge of the tomb field, here a total of about 40 tombs only five meters deep from the surface were discovered. This is where the archaeological findings of the University of Michigan totaled to over 250 funerary stelae, Teracotta figurines, amulets, jewelry, faience pottery and 480 Ptolemaic, Roman and Islamic coins all of which is believed to date to the late third and early fourth century dating to the late Ptolemaic period. The University of Michigan later held a total of 194 of the stelae in the collections of the Kelsey Museum, and the few others remain in the Cairo Museum. A funerary chapel was also discovered, which housed eight individual tombs. The most consistent excavation campaign was led by the Egyptian Antiquities Organization, and took place between 1969 and 1974 due to the imminent construction of a canal which would have crossed the site. Nowadays, Terenuthis is poorly preserved partly because of these extensive excavations, partly due to the enlargement of the modern city of Tarrana and its crops. Since 2012, the site is explored by a mission of the Institut Français d'Archéologie Orientale.

=== Obstacles ===
Tarrana is among the many Ancient Egyptian sites that was targeted over its years by pillaging and robbing. In his writing, Peterson talks about finding multiple sections of the cite stripped of artifacts. He also states that those searching for antiquities did so with the intention of ensuring the cite appeared undisturbed by backfilling the areas looted. Environmental factors also leave a gap in the information provided by Peterson. Due to the high winds and the "rolling terrain" which granted the sites name of Kom Abou Billou, there is no exact location provided for the 40 tombs.

== History ==
Tarrana was an ancient city which housed the necropolitan site for its society members. It is believed by Finley A. Hooper that the entire space was perhaps solely served as a burial ground. However, due to natural environmental factors and looting over centuries, only a small portion of the Tarrana burial space has been found and excavated today.

The earliest tombs discovered in the site date back to the Old Kingdom, mostly to the 6th Dynasty. Another cemetery was made during the Middle Kingdom, and another one in the New Kingdom, the latter being characterized by the use of large-faced ceramic coffins.

At one point, a temple of Hathor was erected, of which some blocks depicting pharaoh Ptolemy I were found. The temple was accompanied by a dedicated cemetery where sacred cattle were buried. Another temple, dedicated to Apollo, was built at the northernmost border of the site: it was later completely destroyed to its foundations, leaving only a few blocks.

The northeastern sector of the site hosted a very large necropolis dating to the Graeco-Roman and Coptic periods: a large amount of artefacts of various types has been recovered from these tombs, some of which suggests that during these times, Terenuthis flourished thanks to the trade of wine and salt with the Wadi el-Natrun. Many tombs have a square superstructure made from mudbricks, and an inner vaulted roof. From these tombs a large number of stelae were found. These are inscribed with either Greek or Demotic Egyptian texts, and provide glimpses of daily life of the period between 100 and 300 CE.
A smaller cemetery, dating to the 2nd century CE, was dedicated to Aphrodite. Two Roman thermae once stood south of the aforementioned temple of Apollo.

Terenuthis became a bishopric that, being in the province of Aegyptus Prima was a suffragan of Alexandria and is included in the Catholic Church's list of titular sees. Le Quien mentions two of its bishops: Arsinthius in 404; Eulogius at the First Council of Ephesus in 431.

The monks sometimes sought refuge in Terenuthis during incursions of the Maziks. John Moschus went there at the beginning of the 7th century. There is frequent mention of Terenuthis in Christian Coptic literature.

Tarrana was the site of a minor battle during the Muslim conquest of Egypt. After capturing the fortress of Babylon near Cairo in April 641, the Muslim army, led by Amr ibn al-As, moved against the city of Nikiou in the Delta. The Muslims travelled north along with western bank of the Nile, in order to take advantage of the wide-open spaces along the fringes of the Libyan Desert, but had to cross back over to the east to reach Nikiou. Amr chose to cross the Nile at Tarranah, where he was met by a Roman cavalry force. The Muslims easily defeated the Romans and proceeded to reach Nikiou by 13 May.

The name Tarrana dates from around the time of the Mamluk sultan Baibars; the earlier name was Tarnūṭ. It was partially destroyed during the Fatimid conquest of Egypt. Dimashqi spoke praises of it. It was a source of natron.

In December 1293, the emir Baydara, who had assassinated the Mamluk sultan al-Ashraf Khalil and now claimed the title of Sultan for himself, was captured and killed near Tarrana after most of his supporters fled.

Shortly prior to the Battle of Marj Dabiq, members of the qarānīṣa, i.e. veteran mamluks who had belonged to former sultans, were dispatched to fortify numerous localities throughout the Mamluk Sultanate, including Tarrana.

On October 27, 1660, a bloody massacre took place in Tarrana against members of the Faqariya political faction on the orders of the Ottoman governor, who was collaborating with the rival Qasimiya faction. This event was the main source of tension in Egyptian politics for at least 30 years thereafter, with the Faqari leader Ibrahim Bak Dhu al-Faqar vowing to annihilate the Qasimiya in revenge.

The 1885 Census of Egypt recorded Tarrana as a nahiyah under the district of El Negaila in Beheira Governorate; at that time, the population of the town was 1,331 (693 men and 638 women).

== Tombs ==
Peterson recorded 24 different tomb styles at the site, and found the two of its most popular were barrel/pyramid roofed tombs and what he referred to as "slipper tombs". Tombs were primarily constructed out of mud brick

=== Slipper tombs ===
The slipper tombs were constructed out of field stone, mudbrick and clay. These tombs served as enclosures for a single individual to be buried in-ground. One of the best preserved examples of a slipper tomb is numbered tomb 8 by Finley A Hooper. This tomb faces east and has a perceived sacrificial altar platform, that could have served it's neighboring tombs as well.

=== Barrel and pyramid roofed tombs ===
This style of tomb is found in Hooper's collection described as being 1.70 meters high with an underlying platform. This platform has a superstructure on top of it measuring to 1.73 meters by 1.95 metes.This tomb is facing north and is also one of the best preserved tomb structures of the site. Generally the tombs were held up by mud-brick podiums, with eastern facing facades and projecting altar tables. The surface of these tombs and its attachments served the a second function, as a canvas for fresco paintings of festivals. Peterson speculates that the paintings of the festivals serve to allow the deceased access to festivals in the afterlife.

== Funerary stelae ==
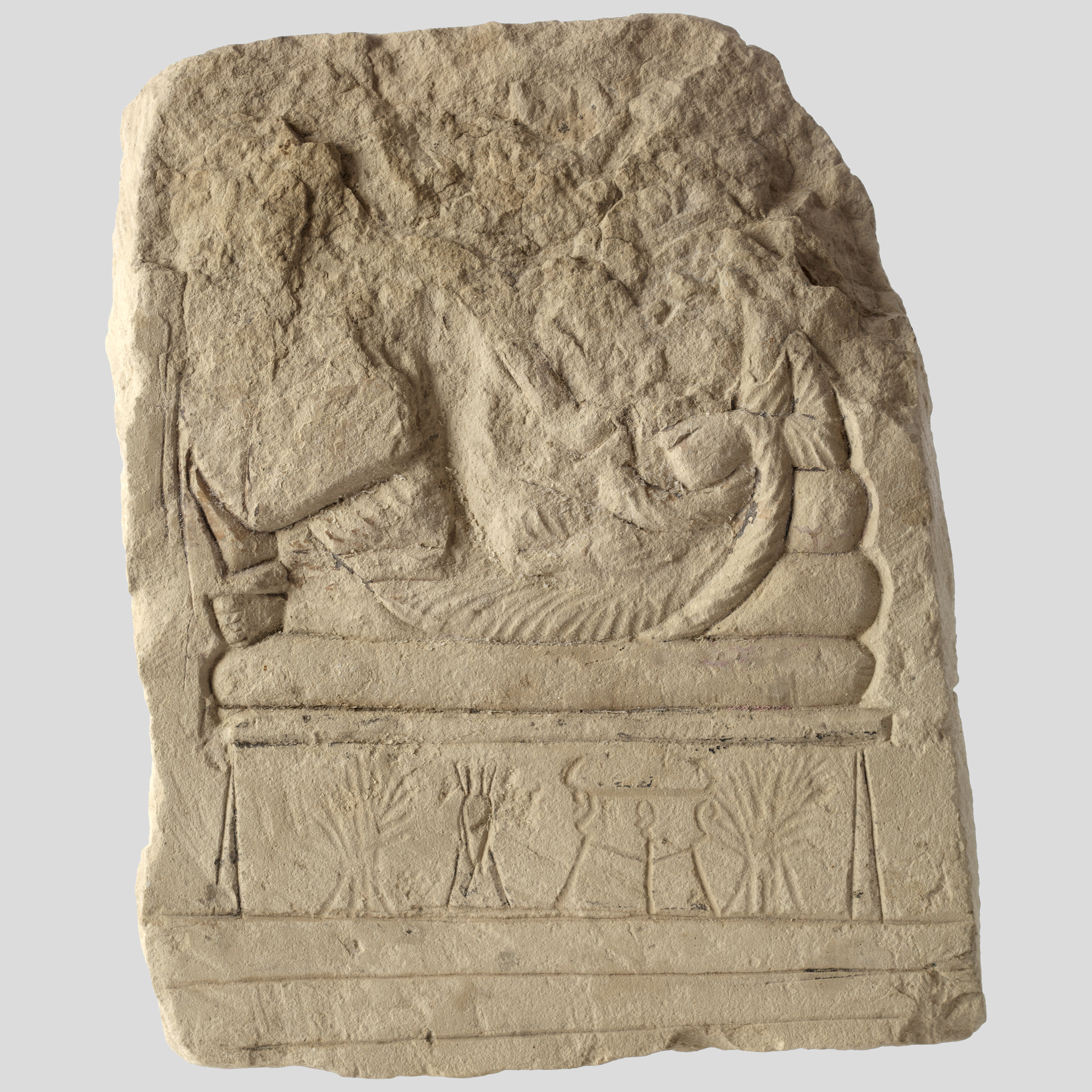
Stelae of man from Kom Abou Billou

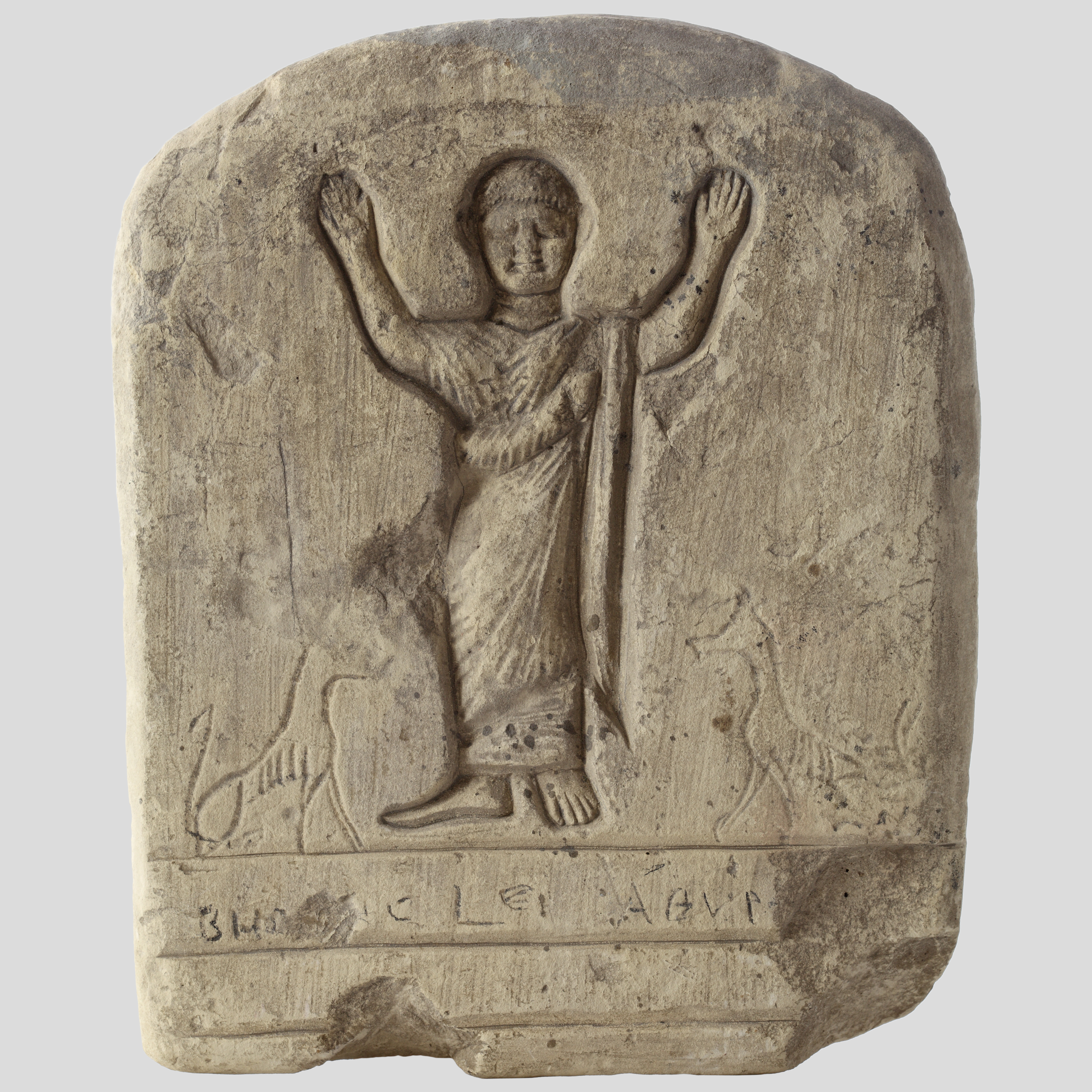
Stelae of Bes from Kom Abu Billou

The Stelae of Bes from Kom Abu Billou measures to 18.8 x 22.2 cm. Some key features of this stelae include the male figures large ears. This is not a physical feature presented in other stelae, indicating that this illustration represents the individuals physical features. Another physical feature represented in the stelae is the chiton and himation, which along with the facial features of the individual, is representative of the Greco-Roman influence in Ancient Egyptian art in the Ptolemaic dynasty. The figure in the stelae is also depicted with two jackals at each of his sides. The jackal represents the God Anubis, who was highly revered during this period. According to Raffela Cribiore the inscription of this stelae reads: "Ήρακλείδηο Ήρακλείδου άλυπε, χρηοτέ, άωρε, χαίρε έτών πέντε μενών τεςάρ[ων] "Herakleides, son of Herakleides free from pain, good, died untimely, farewell at five years and four months of age". The indication of the boys age is not a common occurrences in Ptolemaic or Roman art, as found in this stelae commemorating his life. The majority of the stelae, like the two represented here, have inscriptions just below. Many of them found with the exception of few, also exhibit behaviors in the illustration representative of devotion and offering in the Ancient Egyptian culture. This is seen in figures who hole their arms up with exposed palms, which symbolizes an offering to the Gods.

== Gallery ==
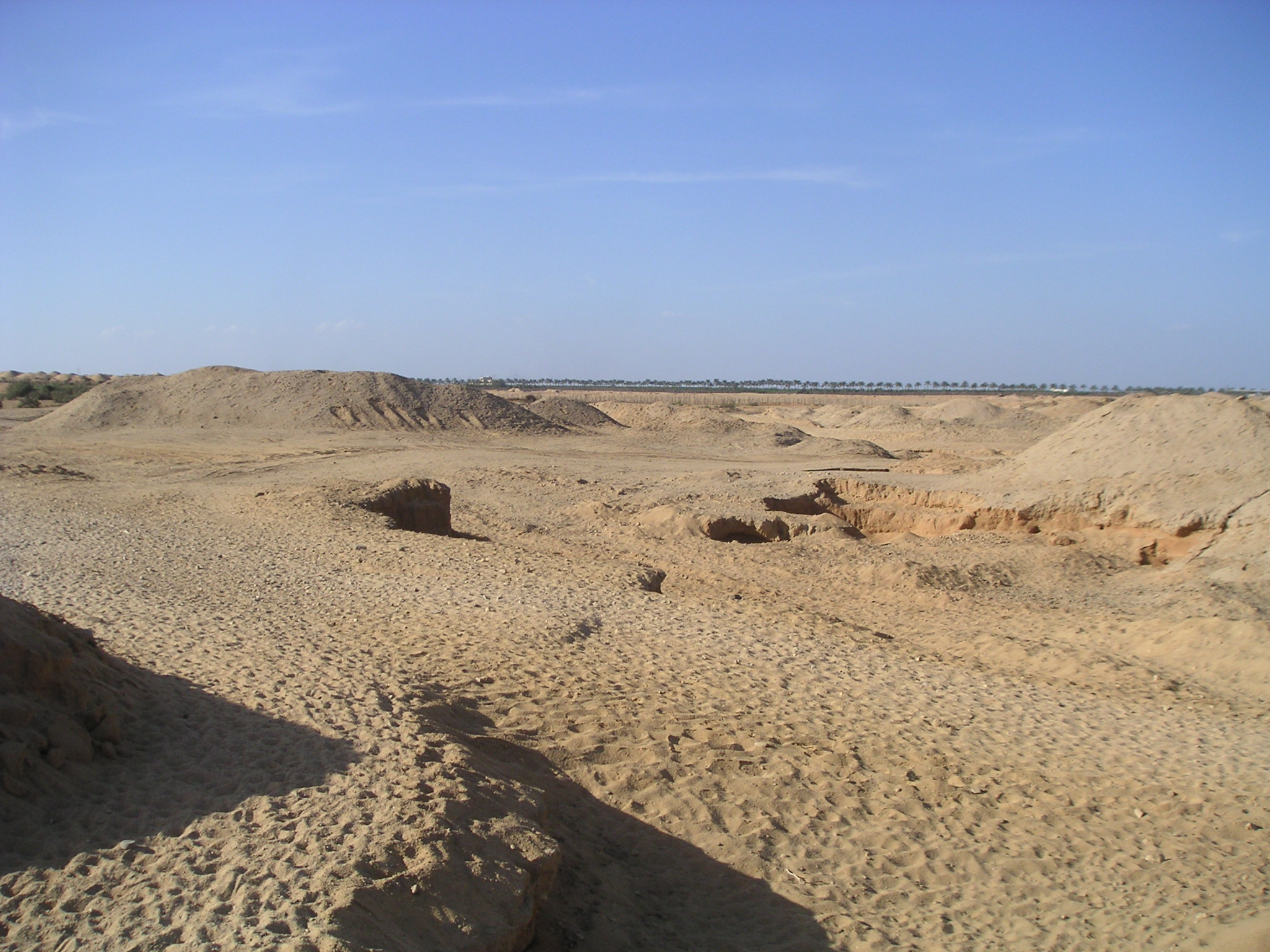
The necropolis at Kom Abu Billo

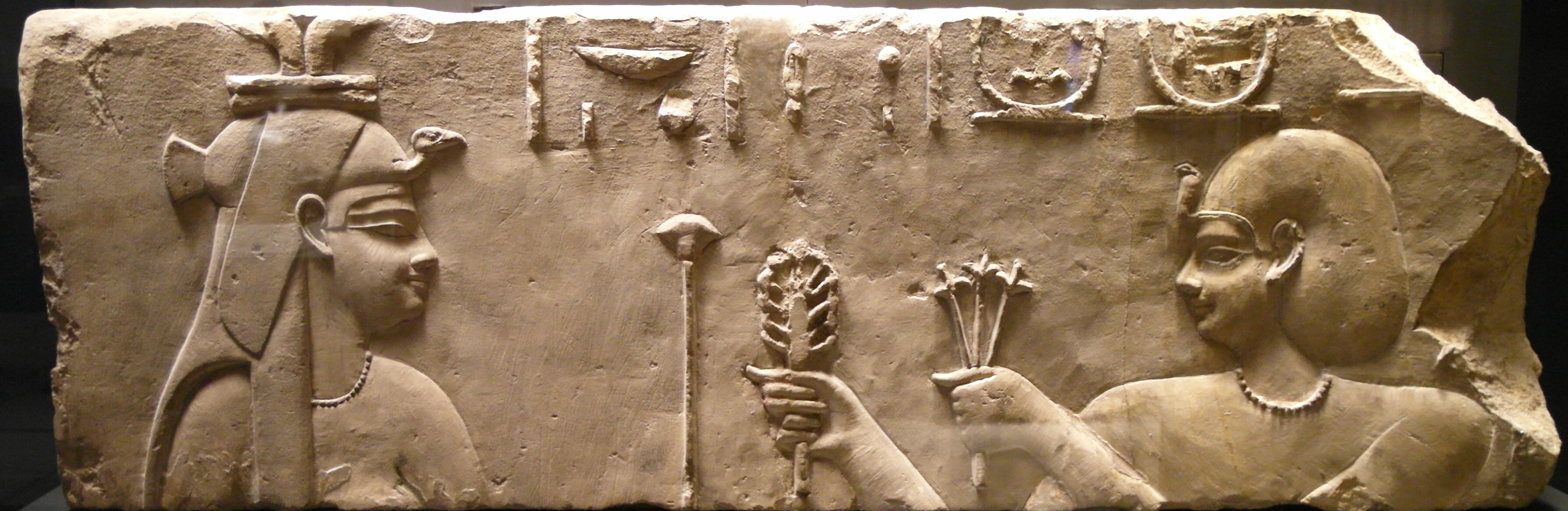
Ptolemy I (right) offering to Hathor; block from the temple of Hathor

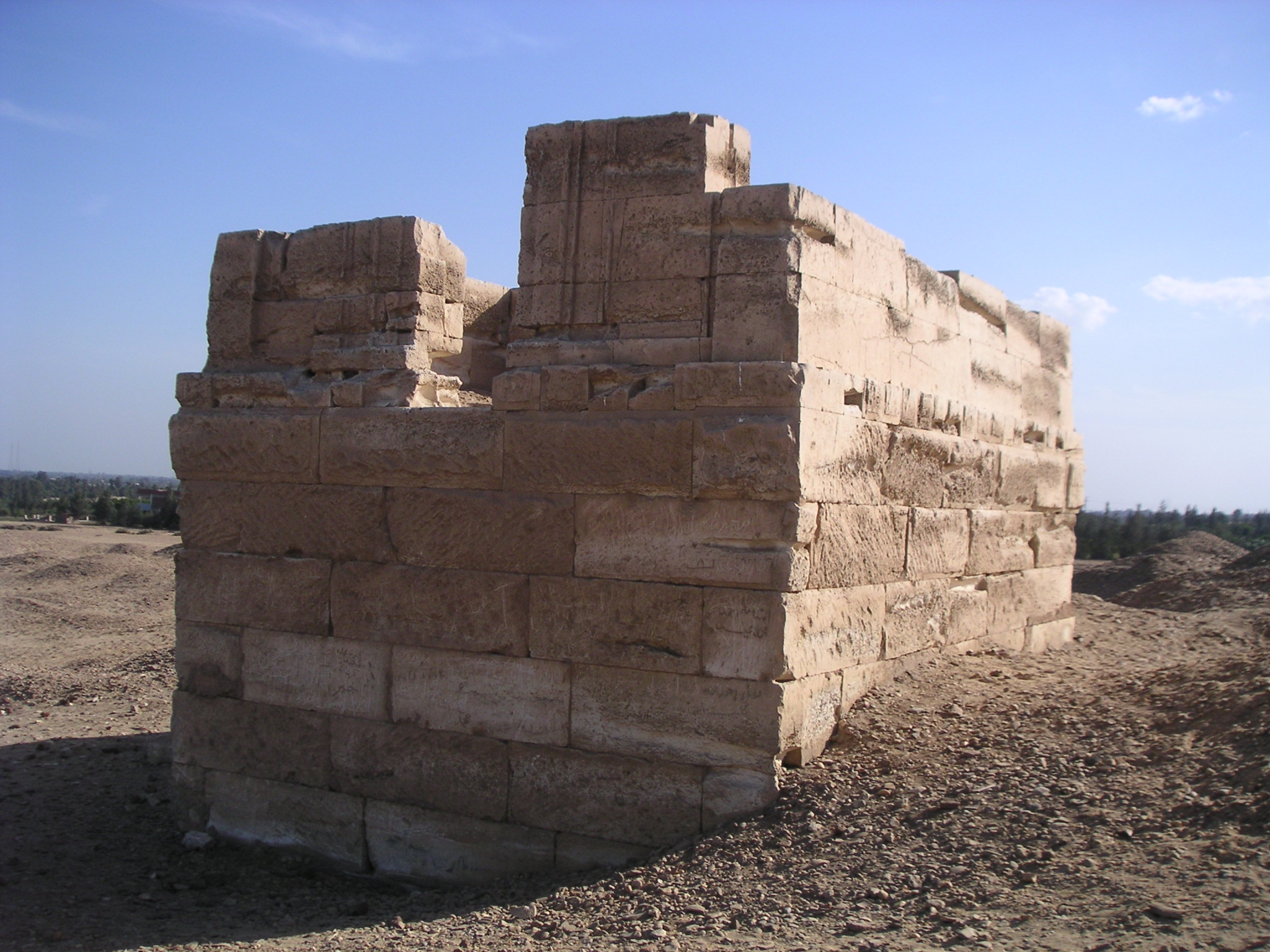
Tomb-chapel, Graeco–Roman period

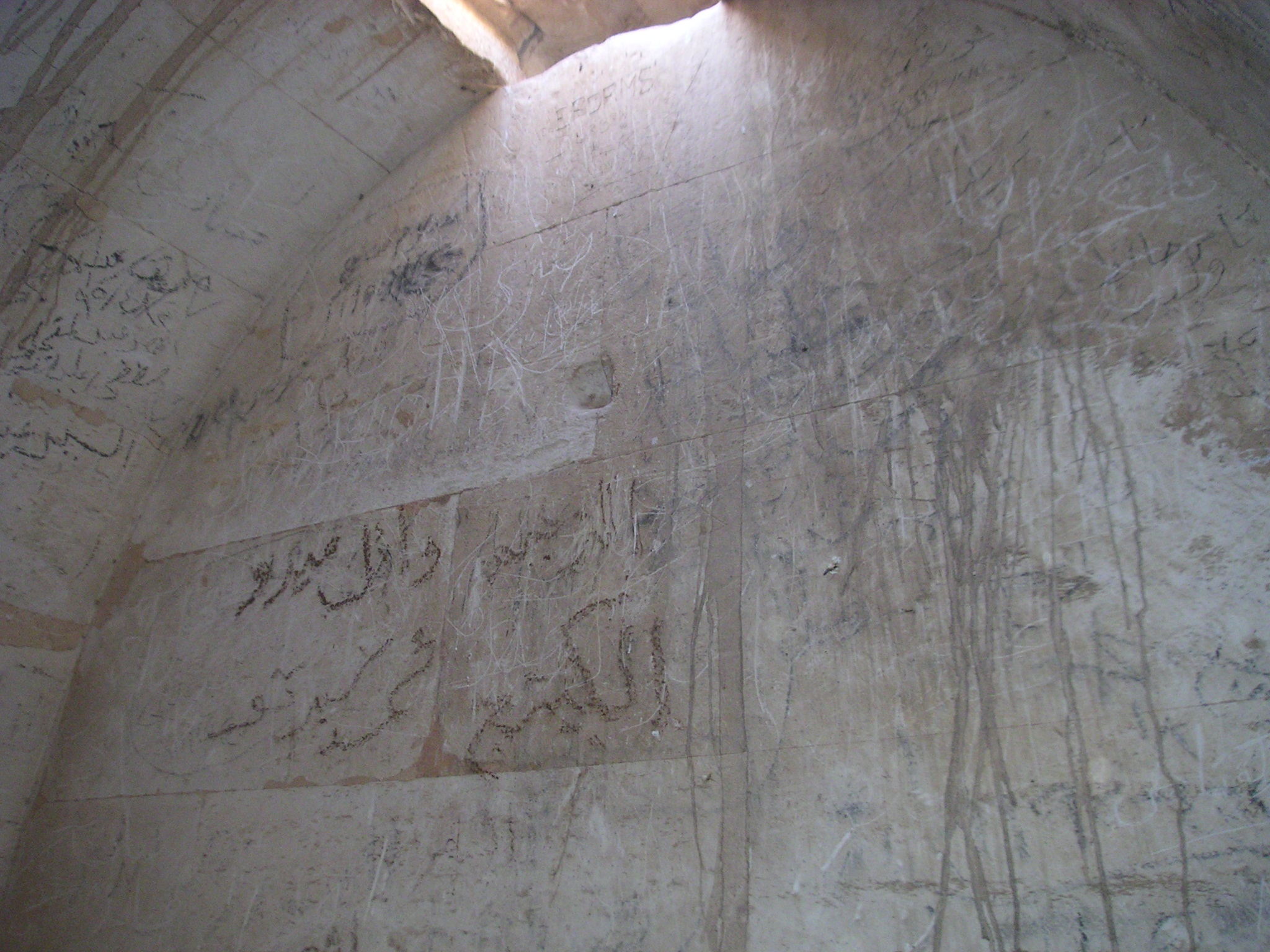
Vault of a Graeco–Roman tomb

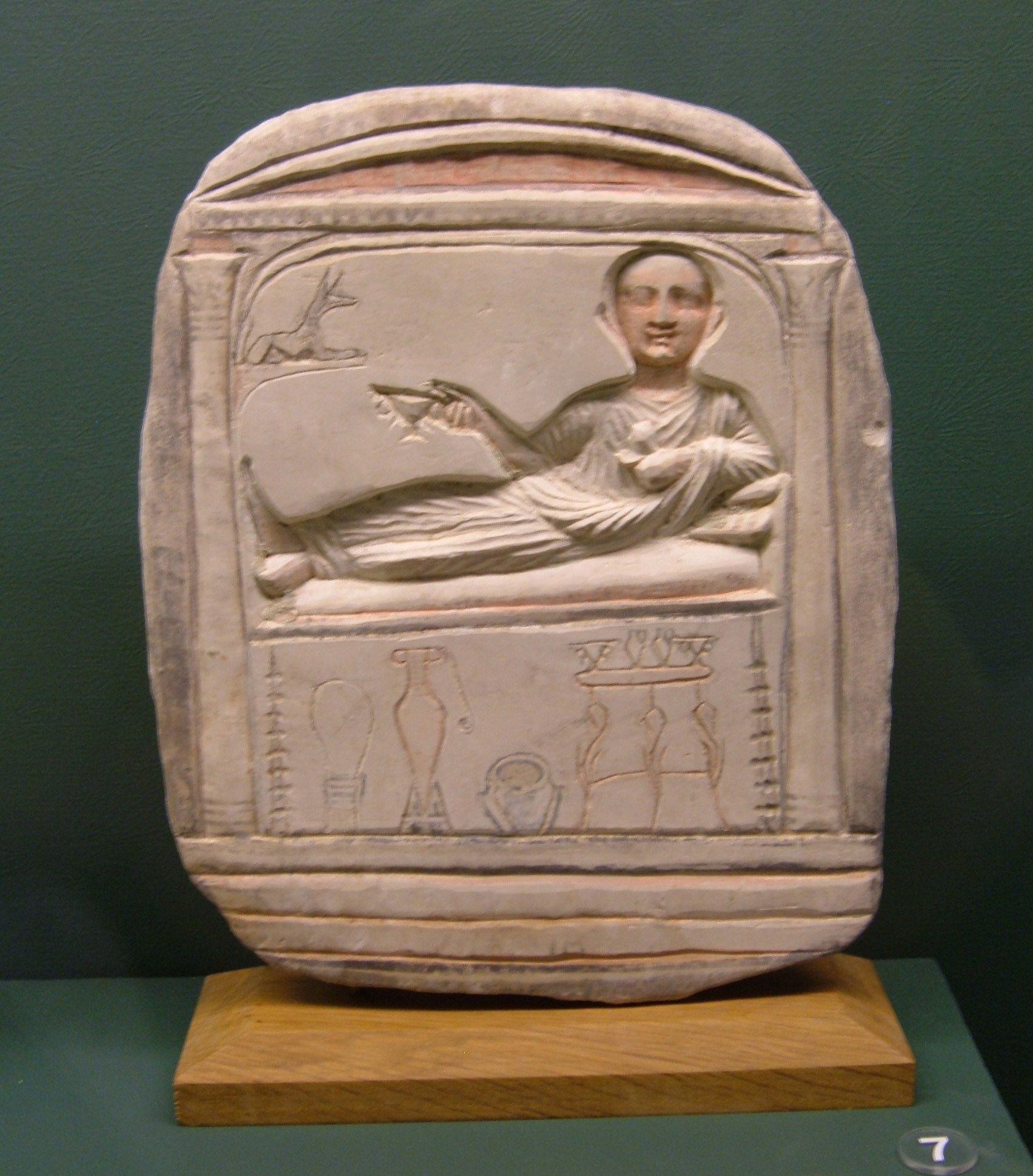
Roman funerary stele, Rosicrucian Egyptian Museum

== See also ==
- List of ancient Egyptian sites, including sites of temples
