= Tayt =

Ancient Egyptian deity

- Tayt offering linen
Name in hieroglyphs
t U30 G1 i i t B1ort U30 G1 i i t I12ort U30 i i t S28 I15
- Consort: Neper or Hedjhotep

Tayt (also Tait, Tayet, and Taytet) was an Egyptian goddess. Some attest her husband was Neper while others state she was possibly the consort of Hedjhotep.

== Textile goddess ==
Tayt was the ancient Egyptian goddess of weaving, textiles, and to a lesser extent mummification. Her role was similar to Hedjhotep. The name Taytet originates from a word meaning garment. Because linen was the most common textile used in ancient Egypt, Tayt often wove or gave linen headdresses to deities and high-ranked officials. Statues of deities were clothed in high quality linen, the linen being considered divine due to its quality and attributes. Linen is derived from the stem of the flax plant: the younger the plant, the higher the grade and the higher the quality of the linen product. Due to linen's protective qualities, Tayt began being ascribed the role of a protective maternal figure. In Pyramid Text spell 738a, Tayt guards the pharaoh’s head, and helps him garner favor among other deities. In ancient Egypt, weaving was a popular commercial activity among workers’ women and royal women. Later, cotton was introduced to Egypt with the Roman Empire.

== Funerary goddess ==
Tayt became associated as a funerary goddess through the application of mummification bandages. Tayt is known as a goddess who “awakes in peace” and is associated with textile offerings to garner favor from deities. As a funerary goddess, she is depicted in the Fifth Section of the Book of Caverns, which describes Ra’s journey through the underworld and his dealings with the damned. She is shown greeting Ra and Osiris in the lower register. In the Pyramid Texts of the Fifth and Sixth Dynasties, Tayt is characterized as a motherly figure wrapping bandages on a dead king. Mummy bandages came from the “land of Tait.”

== Goddess of Tait ==
Tayt was the tutelary goddess of the town Tait as referenced in one of the Pyramid Texts.

== See also ==
- Neith, another goddess associated with weaving

== Works cited ==
- Editor, Hastings, James; Editor, Selbie, John Alexander; Editor, Gray, Louis Herbert. Encyclopedia of Religion and Ethics: Mundas-Phrygians. Andover-Harvard Theological Library.
- "The goddess of weaving Tait". http://www.reshafim.org.il/ad/egypt/religion/tait.htm.
- "Women's Clothing and Fashion in Ancient Egypt". http://www.womenintheancientworld.com/women%27s%20clothing.htm.
- Willems, Harco (1996). The coffin of Heqata : (Cairo JdE 36418); a case study of Egyptian funerary culture of the Early Middle Kingdom. Leuven: Peeters [u.a.]. ISBN 90-6831-769-5.
- "The Book of Caverns". www.touregypt.net (in Russian). http://www.touregypt.net/featurestories/caverns.htm.
- Nicholson, edited by Paul T.; Shaw, Ian (2000). Ancient Egyptian materials and technology (1. publ., repr. ed.). Cambridge: Cambridge Univ. Press. ISBN 0-521-45257-0.
