= Neper (mythology) =

Ancient Egyptian god of grain

- Neper as an age mature man
- Other names: Nepri,Nepra
Name in hieroglyphs
n p r i or n p r i M33 A40

Genealogy
- Parents: Renenutet (mother)
- Consort: Tayt (?), Nepit

Nepit
Name in hieroglyphs
n p r i M33 X1 H8 B1
- Consort: Neper

In ancient Egyptian religion, Neper (alts. Nepra or Nepri) was a god of grain. His female counterpart was Nepit, the goddess of grain. His consort may have been Tayt, the goddess of weaving.

== In myth ==
Pictured in human form, Neper is often depicted as a child suckled by Renenutet. Neper's body was dotted to represent grains. The hieroglyphs that write his name similarly include the symbols of grain. Naturally, as lord of the mouth, Neper's mother was identified as Renenutet, who gave out the ren, a person's true name, and who was also identified as a source of nourishment. In particular, Neper was especially associated with the most used types of grain, namely barley and emmer wheat. His name simply means "lord of the mouth", a reference to the function of grain as sustenance. Once the myth of Osiris and Isis coalesced, since Osiris was a god of agriculture and the dead, his story was associated with the annual harvest and the annual disappearance of any visible life in the crop. Thus, at this point, Neper was considered merely an aspect of Osiris, a much more significant god, gaining the title (one who) lives after dying.
