= Renenutet =

Ancient Egyptian goddess of nourishment and the harvest

- Renenutet holding a papyrus staff
Name in hieroglyphs
r n n w t t I12
- Major cult center: Terenuthis; Narmuthis
- Consort: Geb, Sobek, Shai (some accounts)
- Offspring: Nehebkau, Nepri

Renenūtet or Ermooter or Renooter (Note: Anglicised pronunciations of late Egyptian form.) (Ancient Egyptian: rnn-wtt Ancient Egyptian pronunciation: [ʔəɾˈmuːtʰə~rə'nuːtʰə], also transliterated Ernūtet, Renen-wetet, Renenet) was a goddess of grain, grapes, nourishment and the harvest in the ancient Egyptian religion. The importance of the harvest caused people to make many offerings to Renenutet during harvest time. Initially, her cult was centered in Terenuthis. Renenutet was depicted as a cobra or as a woman with the head of a cobra.

The verbs "to fondle, to nurse, or rear" help explain the name Renenutet. This goddess was a "nurse" who took care of the pharaoh from birth to death. She was also called "the mistress of provisions", "Renenutet mistress of the offerings", "Renenutet mistress of the food", and "Renenutet the venerable of the double granary", and "who maintains everybody".

She was the female counterpart of Shai, "destiny", who represented the positive destiny of the child. Renenutet was called Thermouthis or Hermouthis in Greek. She embodied the fertility of the fields (both the vegetation and the soil itself) and was the protector of the royal office and power. She also came to be seen as a bringer of happiness, and was strongly associated with milk and breastfeeding.

Offerings to Renenutet were depicted in Egyptian wine making scenes, and shrines to her were set up in vineyards. Images of her were found in kitchens, near ovens, in granaries, and in cellars. These images often invoked her to protect food stores against insects, mice, and snakes, not just as a provider of food. Her image also appears on stamps and stoppers for wine containers.

Sometimes, as the goddess of nourishment, Renenutet was seen as having a husband, Sobek. He was represented as the Nile River, the annual flooding of which deposited the fertile silt that enabled abundant harvests. The temple of Medinet Madi is dedicated to both Sobek and Renenutet. It is a small and decorated building in the Faiyum.

More usually, Renenutet was seen as the mother of Nehebkau who occasionally was also represented as a snake. When considered the mother of Nehebkau, Renenutet was seen as having a husband, Geb, who represented the earth.

She was the mother of the god Nepri.

Later, as a snake goddess worshiped over the whole of Lower Egypt, Renenutet was increasingly associated with Wadjet, Lower Egypt's powerful protector and another snake goddess represented as a cobra. Eventually Renenutet was identified as an alternate form of Wadjet, whose gaze was said to slaughter enemies. Wadjet was the cobra shown on the crown of the pharaohs.

Renenutet was also identified with Meretseger, a cobra goddess of the Theban necropolis, and was syncretized with Isis.

== Festivals ==
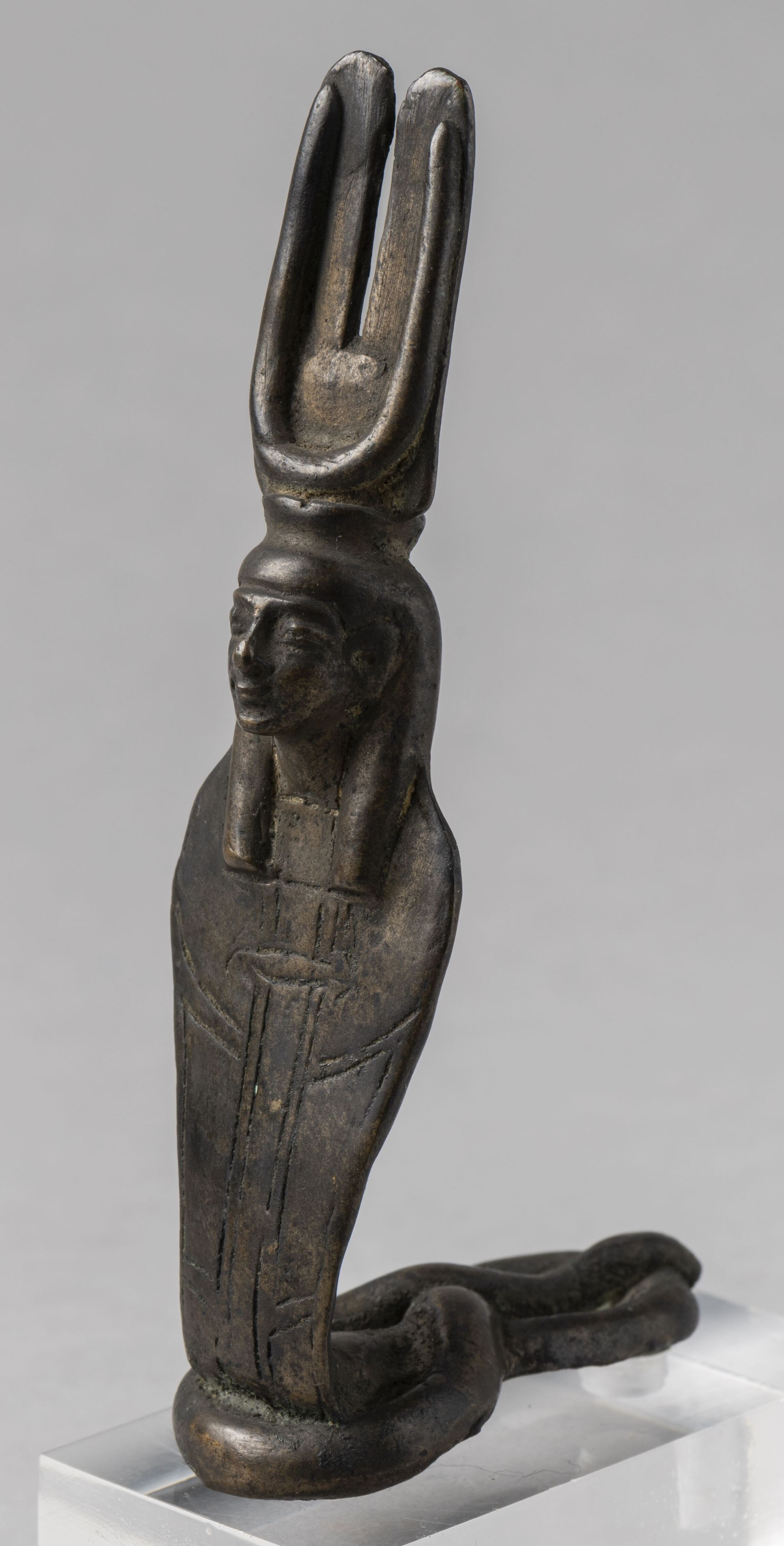
Statuette of the goddess Renenutet. Bronze, between 722 and 332 BC, Late Period of ancient Egypt. Museo Egizio, Turin.

The Festival of Renenutet was an annual Egyptian celebration held between the end of Pharmouthi and the beginning of Pashons. It marked the first day of the harvest season and symbolically linked the birth of child gods to the gathering of new crops. These deities were perceived as providers of fertility and their cyclical rebirth as young solar gods ensured the regeneration of the sun. The festival also incorporated the cult of the reigning monarch, who was identified with the divine child of the local triad, thus reinforcing the legitimacy of royal succession.

The festival’s origins can be traced back to at least the New Kingdom. It was originally seen as the day when Renenutet gave birth to her son Nepri, the god of grain. In Thebes, several child deities were venerated, including Khonsu-pa-khered, Harsiese (Opet Temple), Harpre-pa-khered (North Karnak and Armant), and Somtous (Ptah Temple and Deir el-Medina). It became a festivael particularly in honor of Khonsu, after whom the month of Pashons was named.
