= Silver-gilt bowl (Metropolitan Museum of Art) =

Gold and silver highlighted in The MET collection

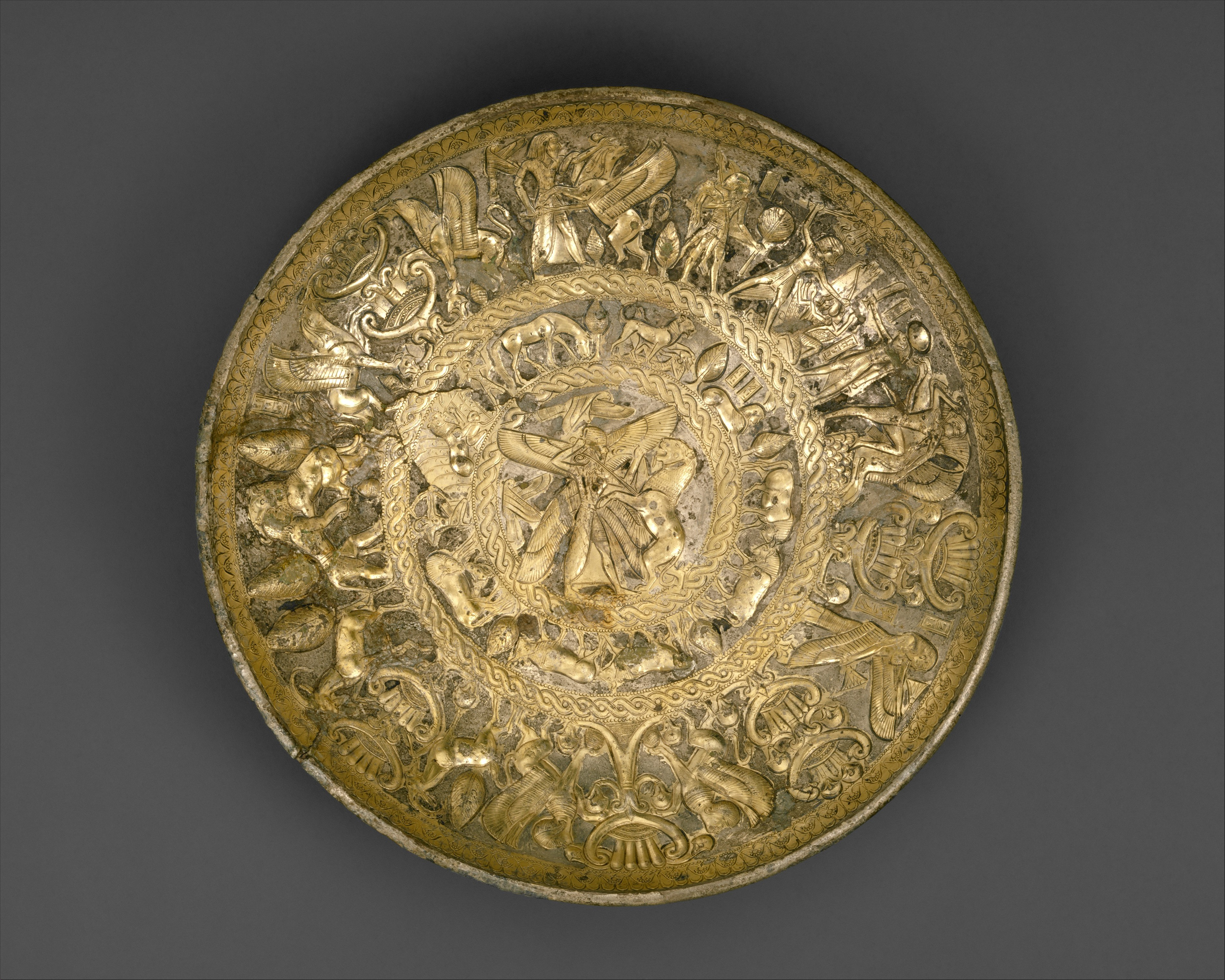
- Year: 7th century BCE (Julian)
- Location: Metropolitan Museum of Art
- Accession No.: 74.51.4554
- Identifiers: The Met object ID: 243823

Silver-gilt bowl is a 7th century BC silver-gilt bowl. It is in the collection of the Metropolitan Museum of Art. It dates to c. 725–675 BC.

== Description and interpretation ==
The work depicts a winged deity (resembling Assyrian deities) cutting down a lion with a sword. Surrounding that is a number of animal and narrative motifs. This includes Egyptian subjects like a sphinx wearing a pschent and a lion walking over a dead man (symbolizing a pharaoh conquering his enemies). The outer band of the bowl also has a variety of motifs, and above that are inscriptions. One, "I am [the bowl] of Akestor, king of Paphos", was partly obliterated and replaced by "I am [the bowl] of Timokretes", presumably by the bowl's next owner.

The bowl's significance stems from its excellent condition, high quality, and its amalgam of Egyptian, Assyrian, and Phoenician features.
