= Pharaoh =

Title of Ancient Egyptian rulers

Pharaoh of Egypt
- The Pschent combined the Red Crown of Lower Egypt and the White Crown of Upper Egypt

- A typical depiction of a pharaoh as a king wearing the nemes headdress, a false beard, and an ornate shendyt (kilt) (after Djoser of the Third Dynasty)

Details
- Style: Five-name titulary
- First monarch: Narmer or Menes (as King of Upper and Lower Egypt); Akhenaten or Thutmose III (first to be called Pharaoh)
- Last monarch: Nectanebo II (last native); Cleopatra and Caesarion (last Hellenistic pharaohs); Maximinus Daza (last to have Egyptian royal titulary)
- Formed: c. 3150 BCE (first by tradition); c. 1458 BCE or c. 1352 BCE (first to be called a pharaoh)
- Abolished: 343 BC (last native pharaoh); 30 BC (last Hellenistic pharaohs); 313 AD (last known use of ancient Egyptian royal titulary)
- Residences: Varies by era
- Appointer: Hereditary

O1 O29
pr-ˤ3
"Great house"
in hieroglyphs

sw t L2 t

A43 A45

S1 t S3 t

S2 S4

S5
nswt-bjt
"King of Upper
and Lower Egypt"
in hieroglyphs

The Pharaoh (Note: (/ˈfɛər.oʊ/, US also /ˈfeɪ.roʊ/; Egyptian: pr ꜥꜣ; (Note: Likely pronounced paɾuwꜥaꜣ in Old Egyptian (c. 2500 BCE) and Middle Egyptian (c. 1700 BCE), and pərəʾaꜥ or pərəʾōꜥ in Late Egyptian (c. 800 BCE)) Coptic: ⲡⲣ̄ⲣⲟ, romanized: Pǝrro; Biblical Hebrew: פַּרְעֹה Parʿō)) was the monarch of ancient Egypt. The title came into use from the Eighteenth Dynasty onwards and was subsequently attributed to all the previous kings of Egypt. Before this Pharaoh was a term that referred more specifically to "king's administration" rather than the king. The earliest confirmed instance of the title used contemporaneously for a ruler is a letter to Akhenaten (reigned c. 1353–1336 BCE), possibly preceded by an inscription referring to Thutmose III (c. 1479–1425 BCE). Although the title only came into use in the Eighteenth Dynasty during the New Kingdom, scholars today use it for all the rulers of Egypt from the First Dynasty (c. 3150 BCE) until the annexation of Egypt by the Roman Republic in 30 BCE.

In the early dynasties, ancient Egyptian kings had as many as three titles: the Horus, the Sedge and Bee (nswt-bjtj), and the Two Ladies or Nebty (nbtj) name. The Golden Horus and the nomen titles were added later.

In Egyptian society, religion was central to everyday life. One of the roles of the king was as an intermediary between the deities and the people. The king thus was deputised for the deities in a role that was both as civil and religious administrator. The king owned all of the land in Egypt, enacted laws, collected taxes, and served as commander-in-chief of the military. Religiously, the king officiated over religious ceremonies and chose the sites of new temples. The king was responsible for maintaining Maat (mꜣꜥt), or cosmic order, balance, and justice, and part of this included going to war when necessary to defend the country or attacking others when it was believed that this would contribute to Maat, such as to obtain resources.

During the early days prior to the unification of Upper and Lower Egypt, the Deshret or the "Red Crown", was a representation of the kingdom of Lower Egypt, while the Hedjet, the "White Crown", was worn by the kings of Upper Egypt. After the unification of both kingdoms, the Pschent, the combination of both the red and white crowns became the official crown of the pharaoh. With time new headdresses were introduced during different dynasties such as the Khat, Nemes, Atef, Hemhem crown, and Khepresh. At times, a combination of these headdresses or crowns worn together was depicted.

== Etymology ==
The word pharaoh ultimately derives from the Egyptian compound pr ꜥꜣ (/ˌpaɾuwˈʕaʀ/, "great house") written with the two biliteral hieroglyphs pr "house" and ꜥꜣ "column", here meaning "great" or "high". It was the title of the royal palace and was used only in larger phrases such as smr pr-ꜥꜣ "Courtier of the High House", with specific reference to the buildings of the court or palace. From the Twelfth Dynasty onward, the word appears in a wish formula "Great House, May it Live, Prosper, and be in Health", but again only with reference to the royal palace and not a person.

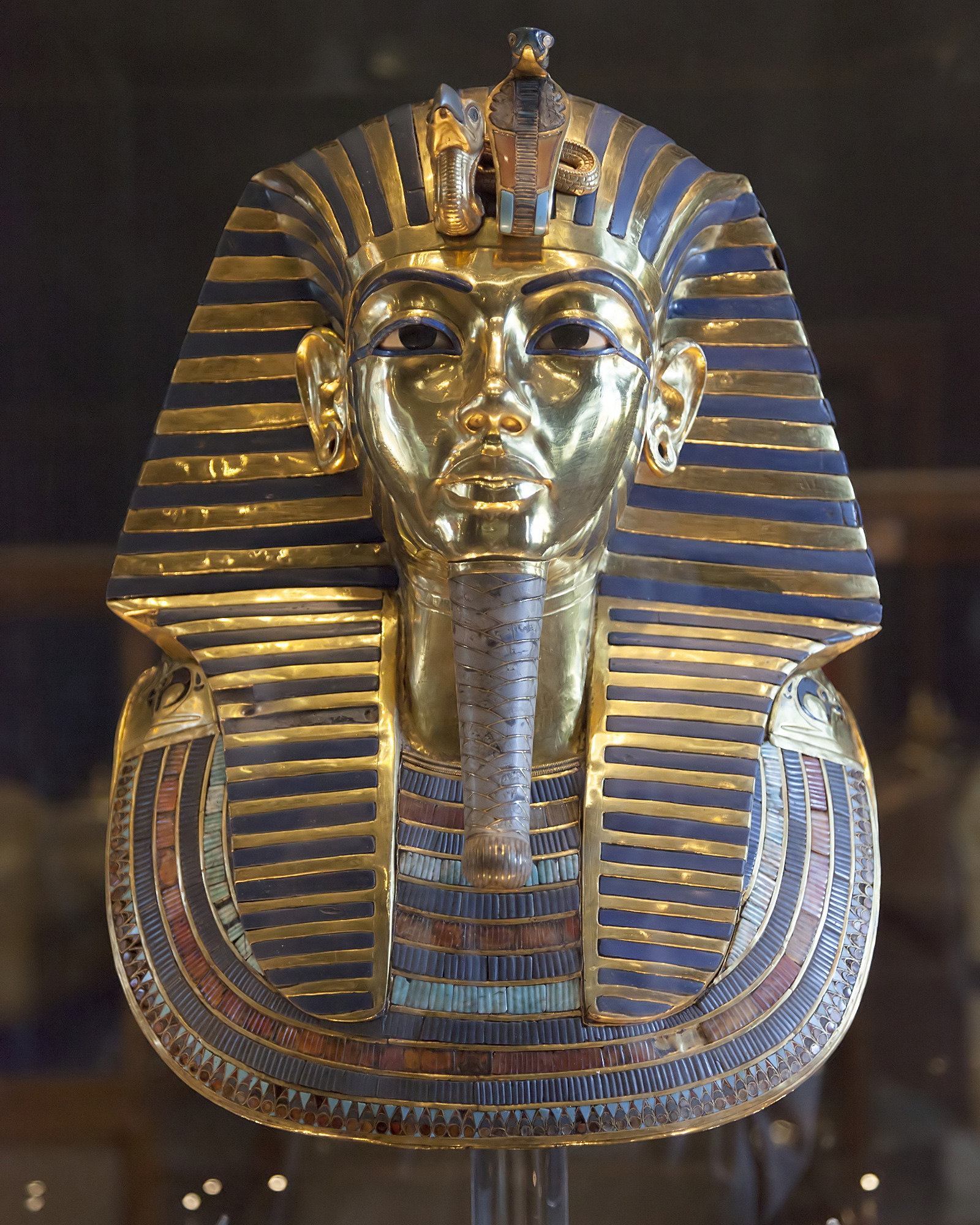
The Mask of Tutankhamun from tomb KV62 in the Valley of the Kings. Pharaohs' tombs were provided with vast quantities of wealth

Sometime during the era of the New Kingdom, pharaoh became the form of address for a person who was king. The earliest confirmed instance where pr ꜥꜣ is used specifically to address the ruler is in a letter to the eighteenth dynasty king, Akhenaten (reigned c. 1353–1336 BCE), that is addressed to "Great House, L, W, H, the Lord". However, there is a possibility that the title pr ꜥꜣ first might have been applied personally to Thutmose III (c. 1479–1425 BCE), depending on whether an inscription on the Temple of Armant may be confirmed to refer to that king. During the Eighteenth dynasty (sixteenth to fourteenth centuries BCE) the title pharaoh was employed as a reverential designation of the ruler. About the late Twenty-first Dynasty (tenth century BCE), however, instead of being used alone and originally just for the palace, it began to be added to the other titles before the name of the king, and from the Twenty-Fifth Dynasty (eighth to seventh centuries BCE, during the declining Third Intermediate Period) it was, at least in ordinary use, the only epithet prefixed to the royal appellative.

From the Nineteenth dynasty onward pr-ꜥꜣ on its own, was used as regularly as ḥm, "Majesty". The term, therefore, evolved from a word specifically referring to a building to a respectful designation for the ruler presiding in that building, particularly by the time of the Twenty-Second Dynasty and Twenty-third Dynasty.

The first dated appearance of the title "pharaoh" being attached to a ruler's name occurs in Year 17 of Siamun (tenth century BCE) on a fragment from the Karnak Priestly Annals, a religious document. Here, an induction of an individual to the Amun priesthood is dated specifically to the reign of "Pharaoh Siamun". This new practice was continued under his successor, Psusennes II, and the subsequent kings of the twenty-second dynasty. For instance, the Large Dakhla stela is specifically dated to Year 5 of king "Pharaoh Shoshenq, beloved of Amun", whom all Egyptologists concur was Shoshenq I—the founder of the Twenty-second Dynasty—including Alan Gardiner in his original 1933 publication of this stela. Shoshenq I was the second successor of Siamun. Meanwhile, the traditional custom of referring to the sovereign as, pr-ˤ3, continued in official Egyptian narratives.

During Ptolemaic period the female form, pr-‘3.t, emerged, although it has not been so far found in hieroglyphic inscriptions and is known only from demotic papyri. While it is attested for queens regnant like Cleopatra II and Cleopatra III, as well Cleopatra VII, it was also granted to the two royal consorts who were not recognized as heads of state by administrative records: Berenice II and Cleopatra I Syra. According to Tara Sewell-Lasater, the latter means the phrase pr-‘3.t/"female Pharaoh" during Ptolemaic period was not used to denote a female sovereign but to express favoured by Ptolemies religious-political concept of the royal pair ruling as one unit, regardless if they were king and queen consort or formal co-rulers.

The title is reconstructed to have been pronounced *[parʕoʔ] in the Late Egyptian language, from which the Greek historian Herodotus derived the name of one of the Egyptian kings, Koine Greek: Φερων. In the Hebrew Bible, the title also occurs as Hebrew: פרעה [parʕoːh]; from that, in the Septuagint, Koine Greek: φαραώ, romanized: pharaō, and then in Late Latin pharaō, both -n stem nouns. The Qur'an likewise spells it Arabic: فرعون firʿawn with n (here, always referring to the one evil king in the Book of Exodus story, by contrast to the good king in surah Yusuf's story). The Arabic combines the original ayin from Egyptian along with the -n ending from Greek.

In English, the term was at first spelled "Pharao", but the translators for the King James Bible revived "Pharaoh" with "h" from the Hebrew. Meanwhile, in Egypt, *[par-ʕoʔ] evolved into Sahidic Coptic ⲡⲣ̅ⲣⲟ pərro and then ərro by rebracketing p- as the definite article "the" (from ancient Egyptian pꜣ).

Other notable epithets are nswt, translated to "king"; ḥm, "Majesty"; jty for "monarch or sovereign"; nb for "lord"; (Note: nb.f means "his lord", the monarchs were introduced with (.f) for his, (.k) for your.) and ḥqꜣ for "ruler".

== Functions ==
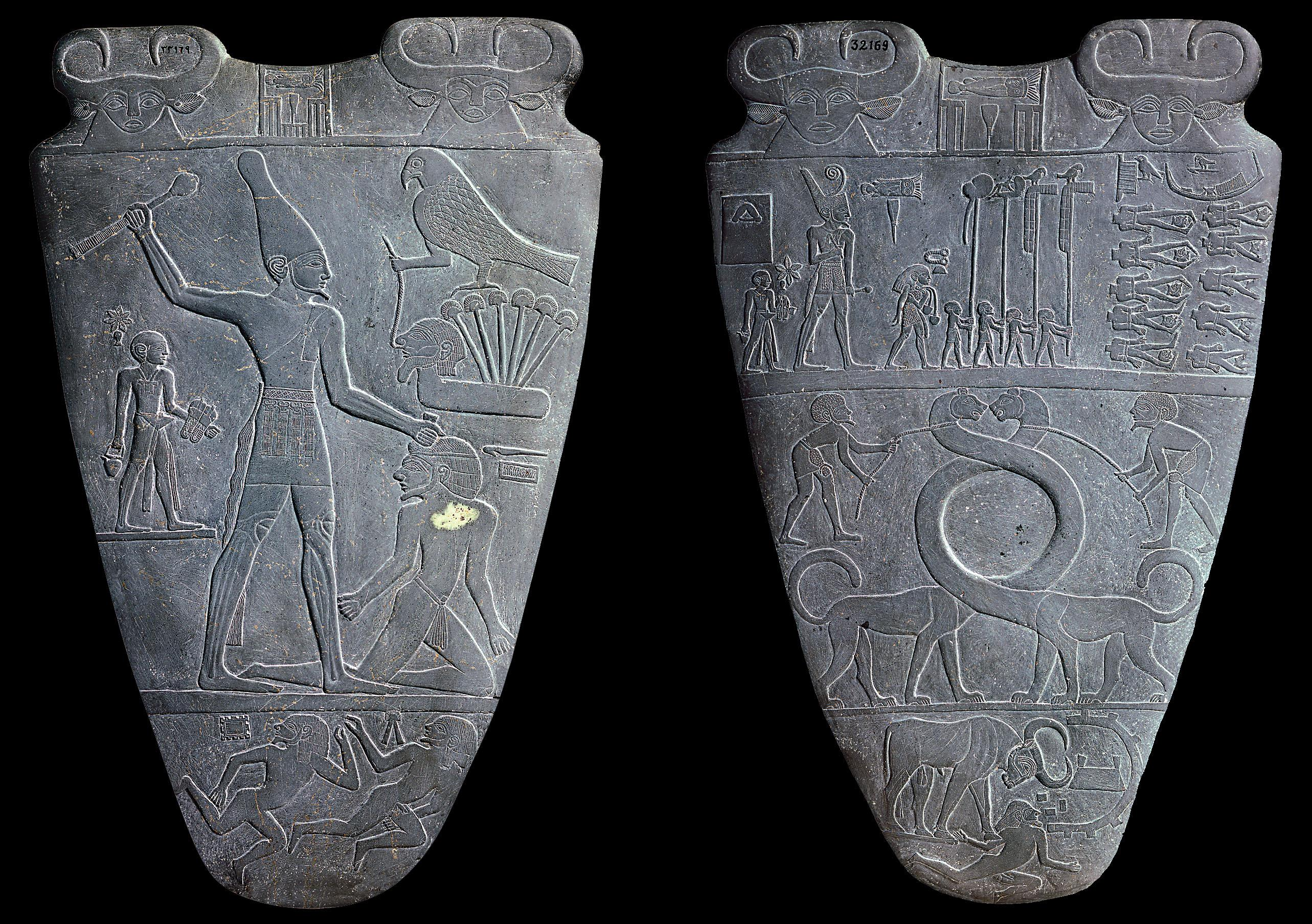
The Narmer Palette depicts the unification of the Two Lands.

As a central figure of the state, the pharaoh was the obligatory intermediary between the gods and humans. To the former, he ensured the proper performance of rituals in the temples; to the latter, he guaranteed agricultural prosperity, the defense of the territory and impartial justice.

In the sanctuaries, the image of the sovereign is omnipresent through parietal scenes and statues. In this iconography, the pharaoh is invariably represented as the equal of the gods. In the religious speech, he is however only their humble servant, a zealous servant who makes multiple offerings. This piety expresses the hope of a just return of service. Filled with goods, the gods must favorably activate the forces of nature for a common benefit to all Egyptians. The only human being admitted to dialogue with the gods on an equal level, the Pharaoh was the supreme officiant; the first of the priests of the country. More widely, the pharaonic gesture covered all the fields of activity of the collective and ignored the separation of powers. Also, every member of the administration acts only in the name of the royal person, by delegation of power.

From the Pyramid Texts, the political actions of the sovereign were framed by a single maxim: "Bring Maat and repel Isfet", that is to say, promote harmony and repel chaos. As the nurturing father of the people, the Pharaoh ensured prosperity by calling upon the gods to regulate the waters of the Nile, by opening the granaries in case of famine and by guaranteeing a good distribution of arable land. Chief of the armies, the pharaoh was the brave protector of the borders. Like Ra who fights the serpent Apophis, the king of Egypt repels the plunderers of the desert, fights the invading armies and defeats the internal rebels. The Pharaoh was always the sole victor; standing up and knocking out a bunch of prisoners or shooting arrows from his battle chariot. As the only legislator, the laws and decrees he promulgated were seen as inspired by divine wisdom. This legislation, kept in the archives and placed under the responsibility of the vizier, applied to all, for the common good and social agreement.

== Regalia ==
=== Scepters and staves ===
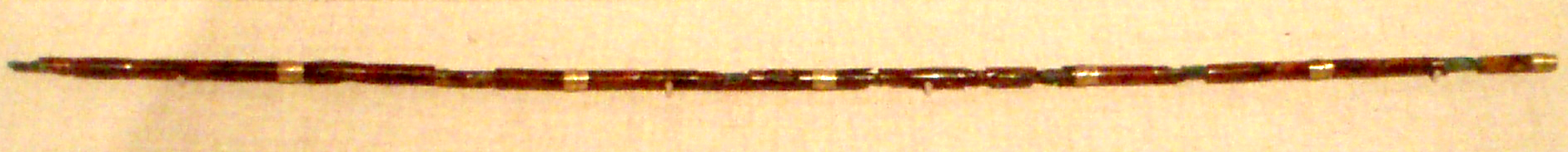
Beaded scepter of Khasekhemwy, c. 2890–2680 BCE, Museum of Fine Arts, Boston

Sceptres and staves were a general symbol of authority in ancient Egypt. One of the earliest royal scepters was discovered in the tomb of Khasekhemwy in Abydos. Kings were also known to carry a staff, and Anedjib is shown on stone vessels carrying a so-called mks-staff. The scepter with the longest history seems to be the heqa-sceptre, sometimes described as the shepherd's crook. The earliest examples of this piece of regalia dates to prehistoric Egypt. A scepter was found in a tomb at Abydos that dates to Naqada III.

Another scepter associated with the king is the was-sceptre. This is a long staff mounted with an animal head. The earliest known depictions of the was-scepter date to the First Dynasty. The was-scepter is shown in the hands of both kings and deities.

The flail later was closely related to the heqa-scepter (the crook and flail), but in early representations the king was also depicted solely with the flail, as shown in a late pre-dynastic knife handle that is now in the Metropolitan museum, and on the Narmer Macehead.

=== The Uraeus ===
The earliest evidence known of the Uraeus—a rearing cobra—is from the reign of Den from the first dynasty. The cobra supposedly protected the king by spitting fire at its enemies.

== Crowns and headdresses ==
Narmer Palette

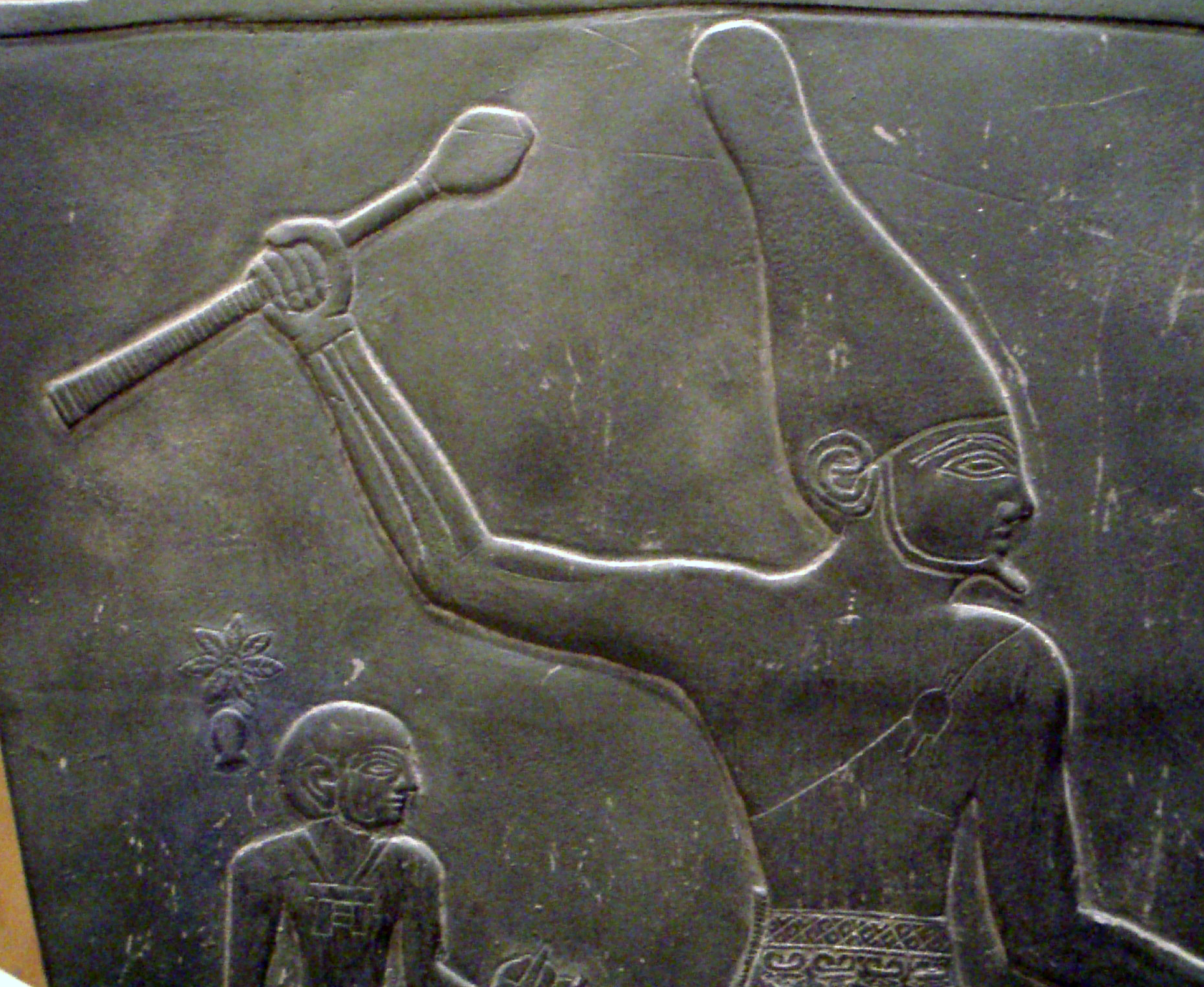
Narmer wearing the white crown

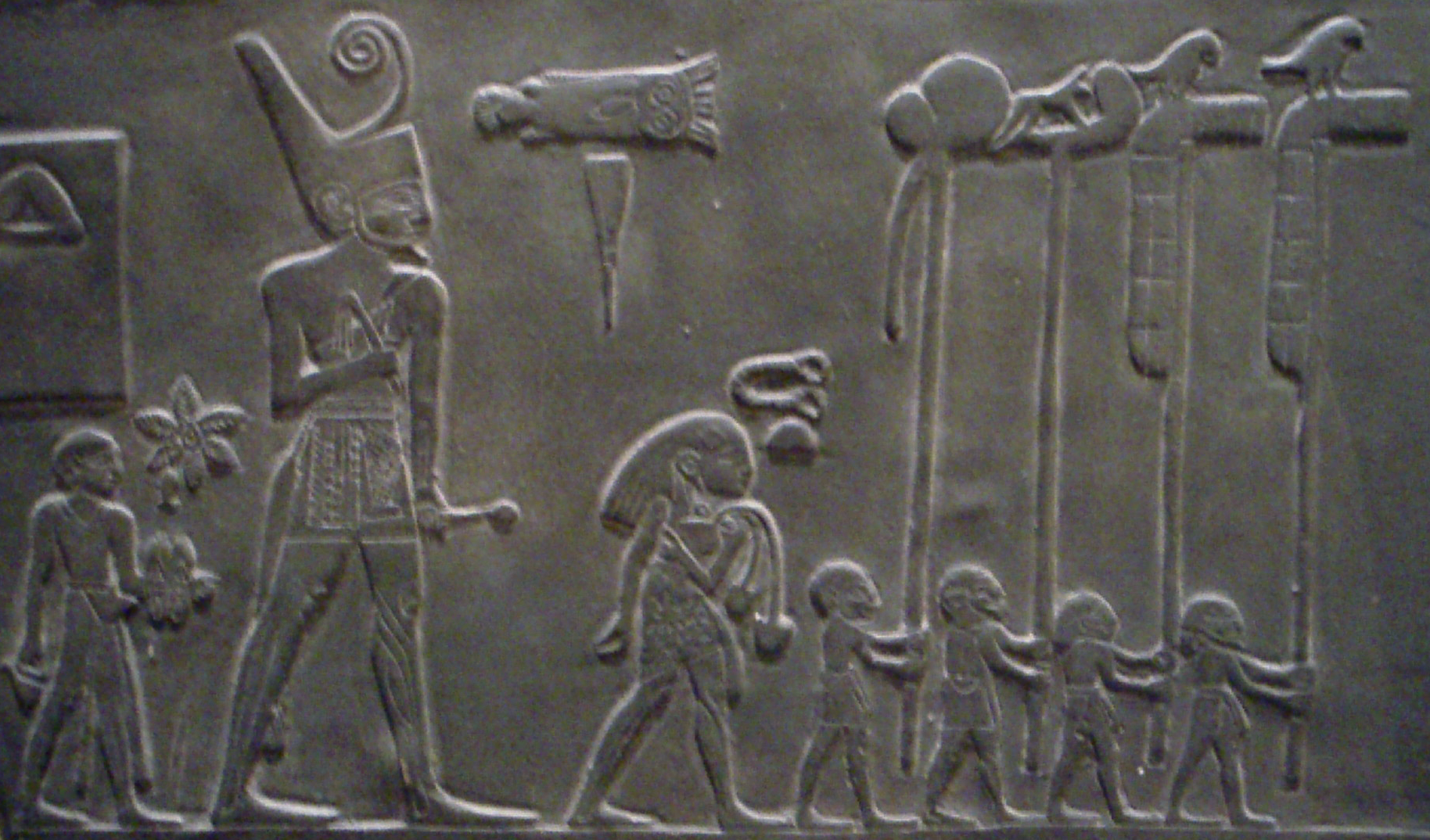
Narmer wearing the red crown

=== Deshret ===
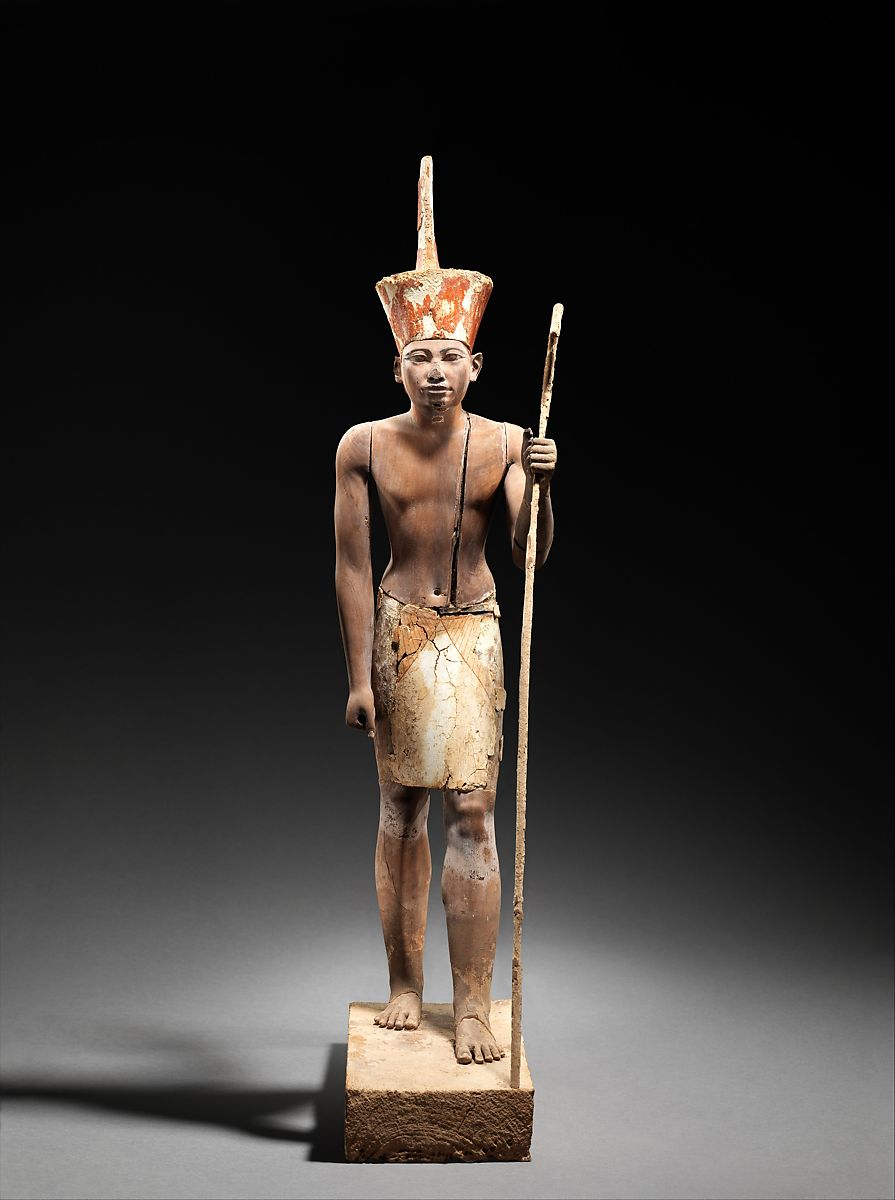
A guardian statue wearing the red crown which reflected the facial features of the reigning king, probably Amenemhat II or Senwosret II, and which functioned as a divine guardian for the imiut. Made of cedar wood and plaster c. 1919–1885 BCE

The red crown of Lower Egypt, the Deshret crown, dates back to pre-dynastic times and symbolised chief ruler. A red crown has been found on a pottery shard from Naqada, and later, Narmer is shown wearing the red crown on both the Narmer Macehead and the Narmer Palette.

=== Hedjet ===
The white crown of Upper Egypt, the Hedjet, was worn in the Predynastic Period by Scorpion II, and, later, by Narmer.

=== Pschent ===
This is the combination of the Deshret and Hedjet crowns into a double crown, called the Pschent crown. It is first documented in the middle of the First Dynasty of Egypt. The earliest depiction may date to the reign of Djet, and is otherwise surely attested during the reign of Den.

=== Khat ===
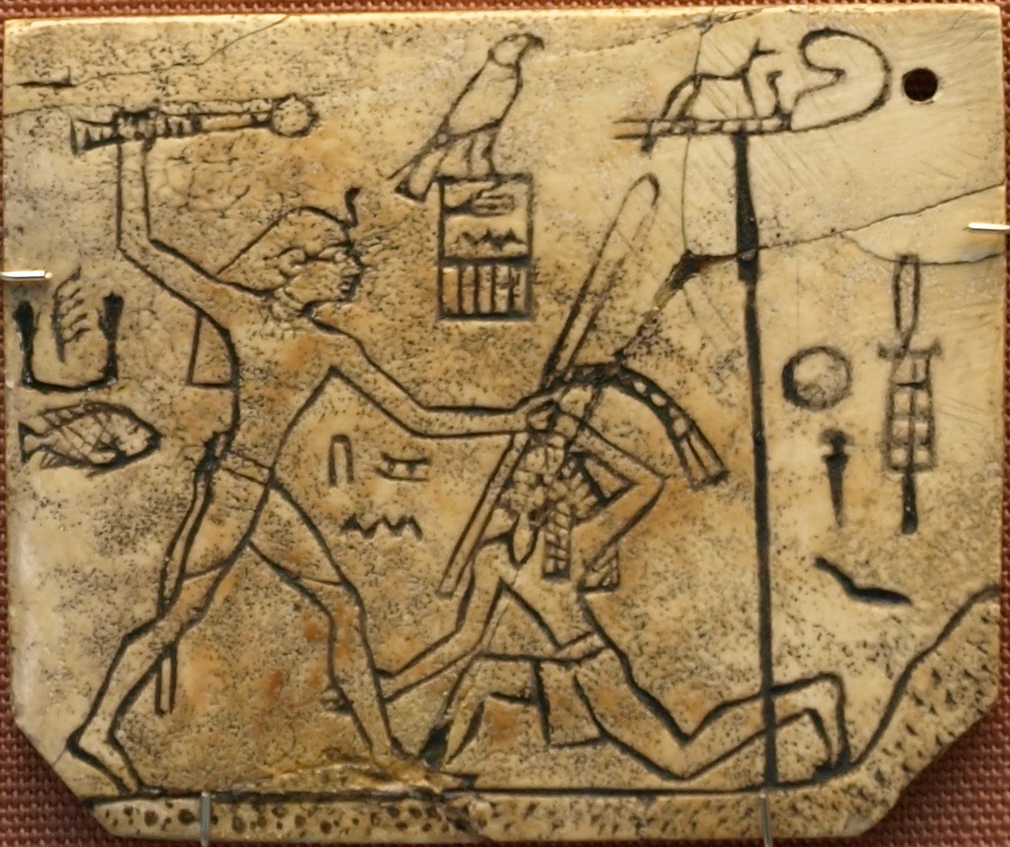
Uraeus depicted on king Den, ivory label found at his tomb in Abydos, c. 3000 BCE, British Museum, London

The khat headdress consists of a kind of "kerchief" whose end is tied similarly to a ponytail. The earliest depictions of the khat headdress comes from the reign of Den, but is not found again until the reign of Djoser.

=== Nemes ===
The Nemes headdress dates from the time of Djoser. It is the most common type of royal headgear depicted throughout Pharaonic Egypt. Any other type of crown, apart from the Khat headdress, has been commonly depicted on top of the Nemes. The statue from his Serdab in Saqqara shows the king wearing the nemes headdress.

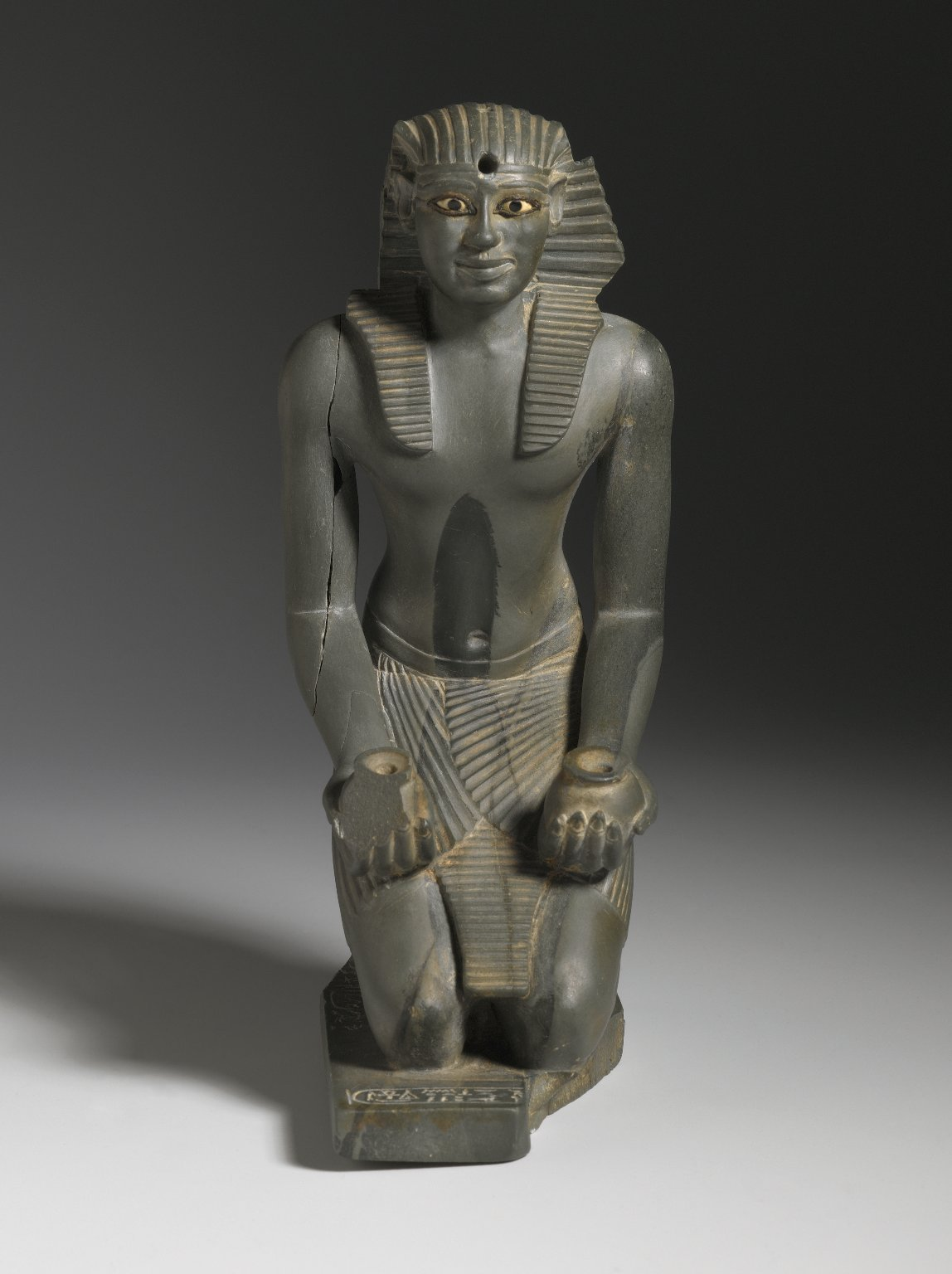
Statuette of Pepy I (c. 2338–2298 BCE) wearing a nemes headdress, Brooklyn Museum, New York

=== Atef ===
Osiris is shown to wear the Atef crown, which is an elaborate Hedjet with feathers and disks. Depictions of kings wearing the Atef crown originate from the Old Kingdom.

=== Hemhem ===
The Hemhem crown is usually depicted on top of Nemes, Pschent, or Deshret crowns. It is an ornate, triple Atef with corkscrew sheep horns and usually two uraei. The depiction of this crown begins among New Kingdom rulers during the Early Eighteenth Dynasty of Egypt.

=== Khepresh ===
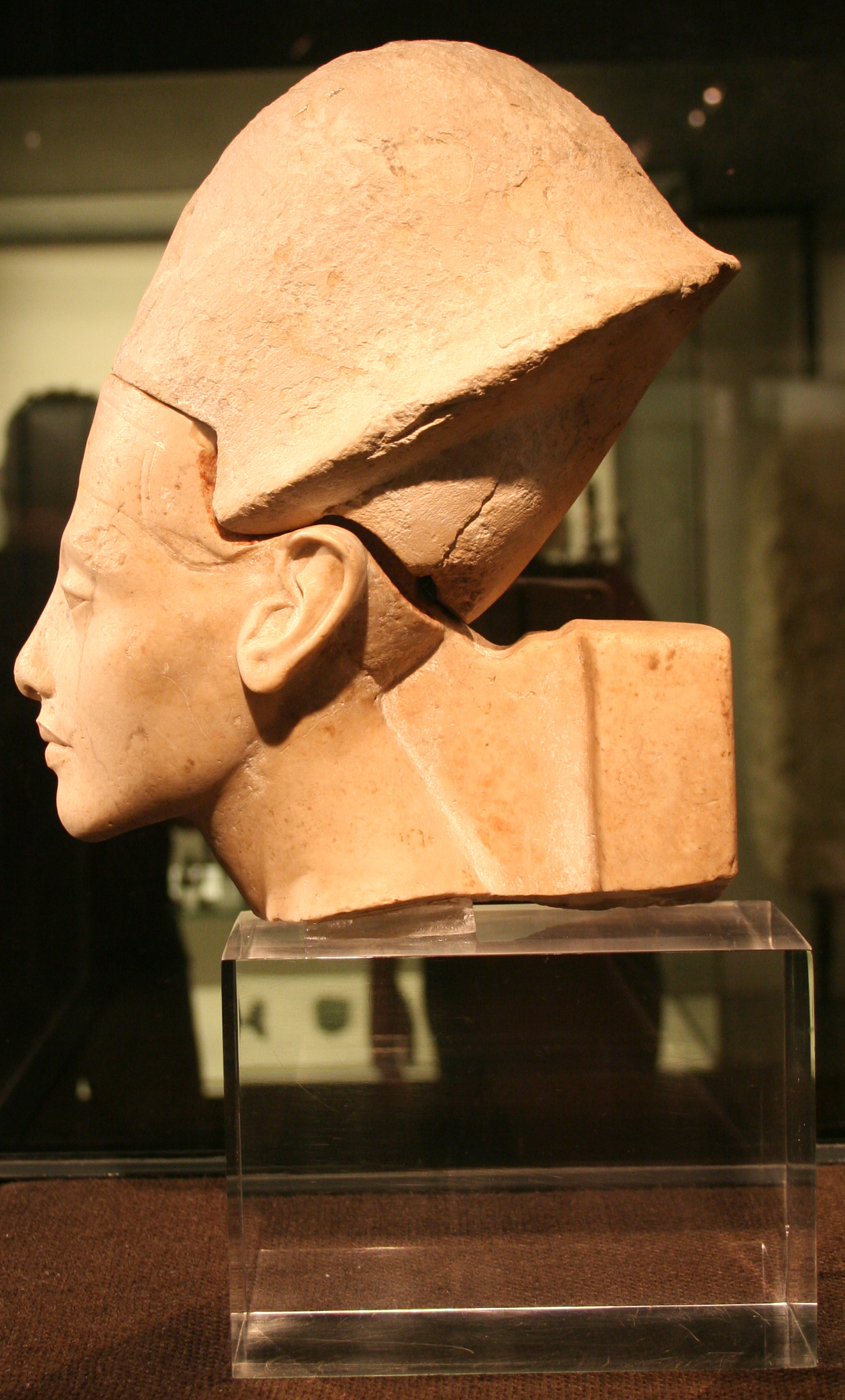
Khepresh crown on Akhenaten, 18th dynasty. Kestner Museum, Hannover

Also called the blue crown, the Khepresh crown has been depicted in art since the New Kingdom. It is often depicted being worn in battle, but it was also frequently worn during ceremonies. It used to be called a war crown by many, but modern historians refrain from defining it thus.

=== Physical evidence ===
Egyptologist Bob Brier has noted that despite their widespread depiction in royal portraits, no ancient Egyptian crown has ever been discovered. The tomb of Tutankhamun that was discovered largely intact, contained such royal regalia as a crook and flail, but no crown was found among his funerary equipment. However, Diadems have been discovered. It is presumed that crowns would have been believed to have magical properties and were used in rituals. Brier's speculation is that crowns were religious or state items, so a dead king likely could not retain a crown as a personal possession. The crowns may have been passed along to the successor, much as the crowns of modern monarchies.

== Titles ==
During the Early Dynastic Period kings had three titles. The Horus name is the oldest and dates to the late pre-dynastic period. The Nesu Bity name was added during the First Dynasty. The Nebty name (Two Ladies) was first introduced toward the end of the First Dynasty. The Golden falcon (bik-nbw) name is not well understood. The prenomen and nomen were introduced later and are traditionally enclosed in a cartouche. By the Middle Kingdom, the official titulary of the ruler consisted of five names; Horus, Nebty, Golden Horus, nomen, and prenomen for some rulers, only one or two of them may be known.

=== Horus name ===
The Horus name was adopted by the king, when taking the throne. The name was written within a square frame representing the palace, named a serekh. The earliest known example of a serekh dates to the reign of king Ka, before the First Dynasty. The Horus name of several early kings expresses a relationship with Horus. Aha refers to "Horus the fighter", Djer refers to "Horus the strong", etc. Later kings express ideals of kingship in their Horus names. Khasekhemwy refers to "Horus: the two powers are at peace", while Nebra refers to "Horus, Lord of the Sun".

=== Nesu Bity name ===
The Nesu Bity name, also known as prenomen, was one of the new developments from the reign of Den. The name would follow the glyphs for the "Sedge and the Bee". The title is usually translated as king of Upper and Lower Egypt. The nsw bity name may have been the birth name of the king. It was often the name by which kings were recorded in the later annals and king lists.

=== Nebty name ===
The earliest example of a Nebty (Two Ladies) name comes from the reign of king Aha from the First Dynasty. The title links the king with the goddesses of Upper and Lower Egypt, Nekhbet and Wadjet. The title is preceded by the vulture (Nekhbet) and the cobra (Wadjet) standing on a basket (the neb sign).

=== Golden Horus ===
The Golden Horus or Golden Falcon name was preceded by a falcon on a gold or nbw sign. The title may have represented the divine status of the king. The Horus associated with gold may be referring to the idea that the bodies of the deities were made of gold and the pyramids and obelisks are representations of (golden) sun-rays. The gold sign may also be a reference to Nubt, the city of Set. This would suggest that the iconography represents Horus conquering Set.

=== Nomen and prenomen ===
The prenomen and nomen were contained in a cartouche. The prenomen often followed the King of Upper and Lower Egypt (nsw bity) or Lord of the Two Lands (nebtawy) title. The prenomen often incorporated the name of Re. The nomen often followed the title, Son of Re (sa-ra), or the title, Lord of Appearances (neb-kha).

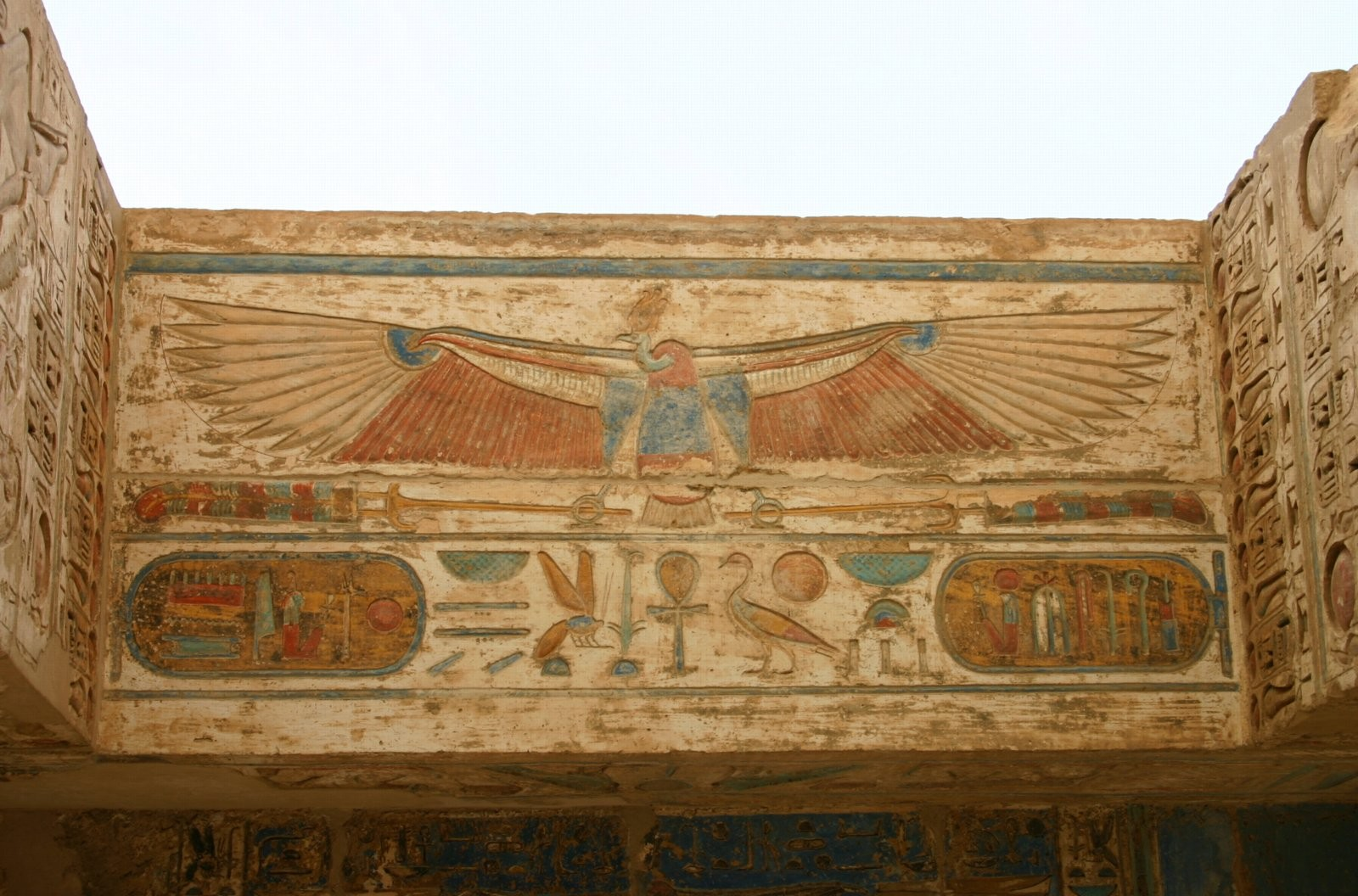
Nomen and prenomen of Ramesses III

== Divinity ==
=== Ancient Egypt ===
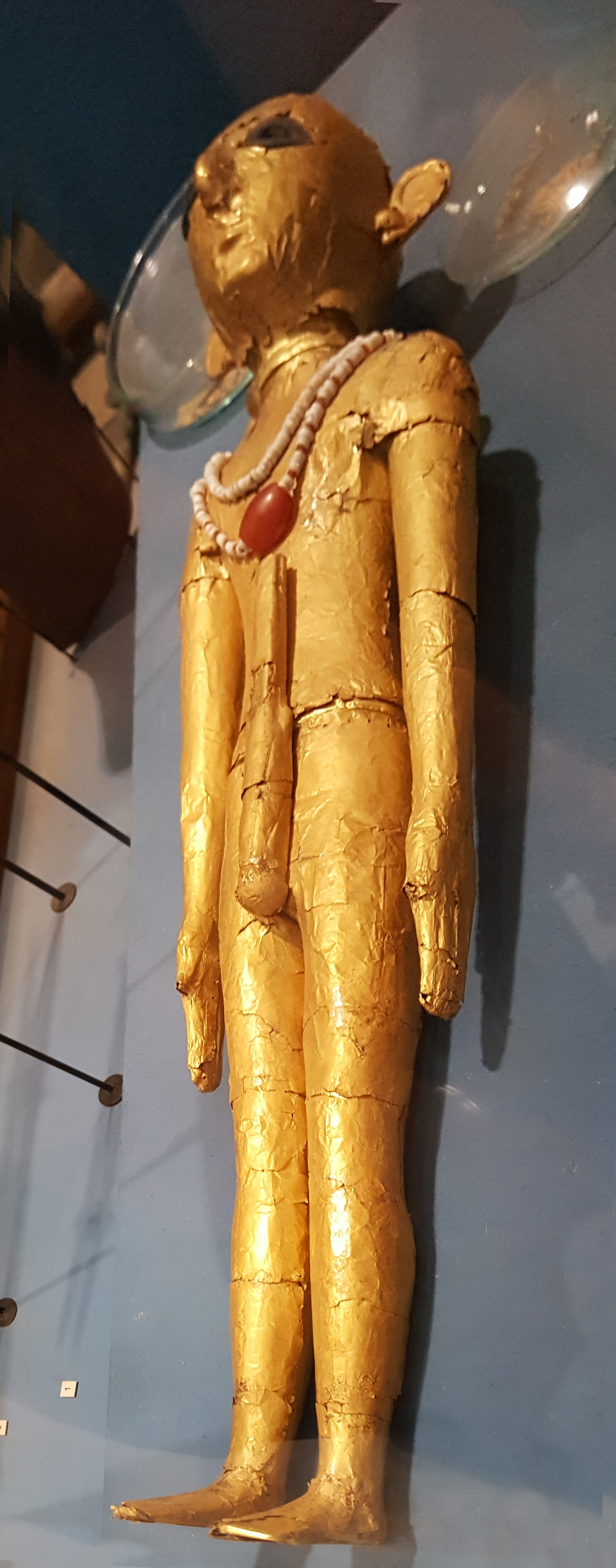
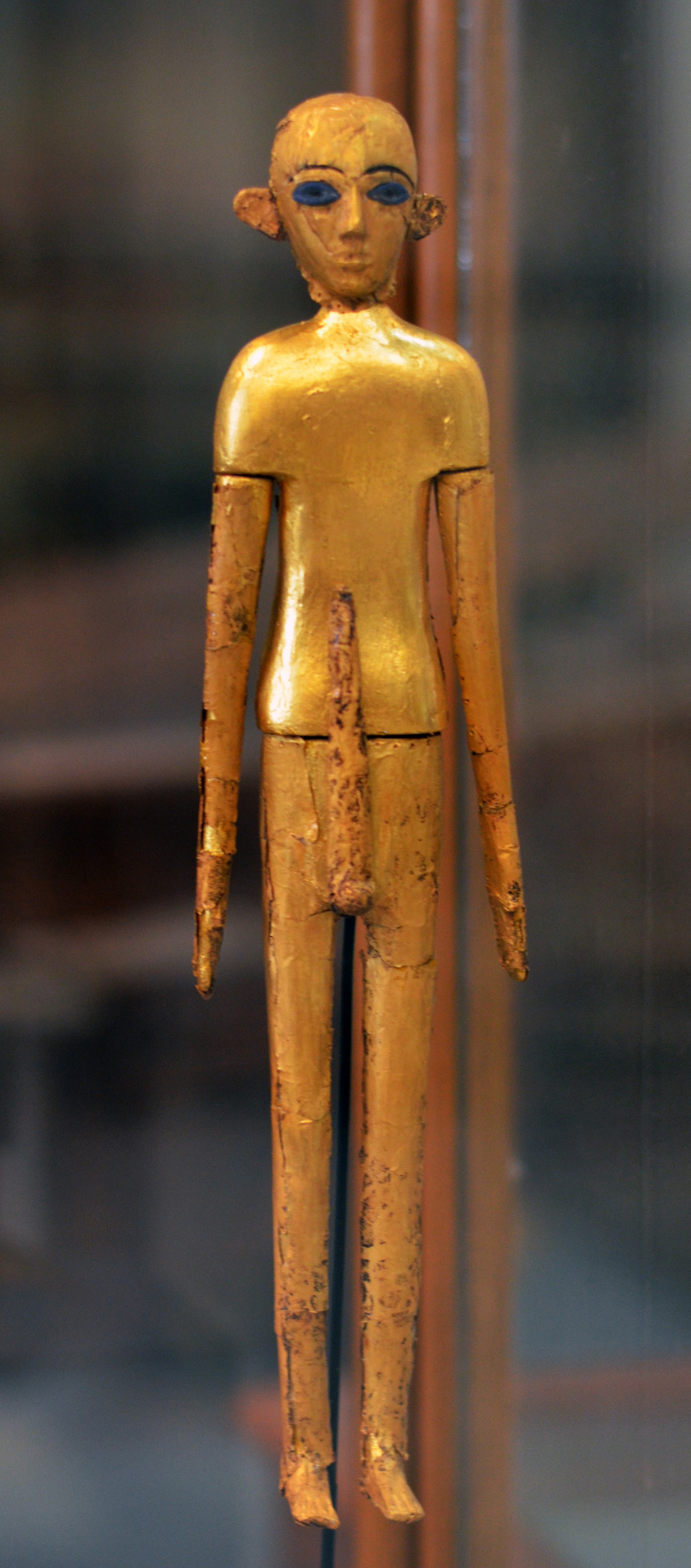
Oldest known representations of ancient Egyptian rulers, from Tell el-Farkha. Naqada IIIB, c. 3200–3000 BC.

In Ancient Egypt, the Pharaoh was often considered to be divine. This precept originated before 3000 BCE and the Egyptian office of divine kingship would go on to influence many other societies and kingdoms, surviving into the modern era. The Pharaoh also became a mediator between the gods and man. This institution represents an innovation over that of Sumerian city-states where, though the clan leader or king mediated between his people and the gods, did not himself represent a god on Earth. The few Sumerian exceptions to this would post-date the origins of this practice in ancient Egypt. For example, the legendary king Gilgamesh, thought to have reigned in Uruk as a contemporary of the Egyptian ruler Djoser, was cast as having had his mother as the Mesopotamian goddess Ninsun alongside his father, the previous human ruler of Uruk. Another Mesopotamian example of a god-king was Naram-Sin of Akkad. During the Early Dynastic Period, the Pharaoh was represented as the divine incarnation of Horus, and the unifier of Upper and Lower Egypt. By the time of Djedefre (26th century BCE), the Pharaoh also ceased to have a father, as his mother was magically impregnated by the solar deity Ra. According to Pyramid Text Utterance 571, "... the King was fashioned by his father Atum before the sky existed, before earth existed, before men existed, before the gods were born, before death existed ..." According to an inscription on the statue of Horemheb (14th–13th centuries BCE): "he [Horemheb] already came out of his mother's bosom adorned with the prestige and the divine color ..." Inscriptions regularly described the Pharaoh as the "good god" or "perfect god" (nfr ntr). By the time of the New Kingdom, the divinity of the king was imbued as he possessed the manifestation of the god Amun-Re; this was referred to as his 'living royal ka' which he received during the coronation ceremony. The divinity of Pharaoh was still held to during the period of Persian domination of Egypt. The Persian emperor Darius the Great (522–486 BCE) was referred to as a divine being in Egyptian temple texts. Such descriptions continued and were designated to Alexander the Great after his conquest of Egypt, and later still for the rulers of the Ptolemaic Kingdom that succeeded Alexander's rule.

=== Classical Greece ===
Descriptions of the divinity of the Pharaoh are much more infrequent in sources from Classical Greece. One Ptolemaic-era hymn describes the divinity of the Pharaoh, though this may reflect Greek notions of divine kingship just as much as it could reflect Egyptian ones. The historian Herodotus explicitly denies this, claiming that Egyptian priests rejected any notion of the divinity of the king. The only explicit classical Greek source which describes the divinity of Pharaoh is contained in the writings of Diodorus Siculus in the 1st century BCE, who in turn relies on Hecataeus of Abdera as his source of information. Diodorus slightly contradicts himself in a different passage where he asserts that Darius I was the first ruler of Egypt to be honored as a king.

=== Rabbinic literature ===
Even after the reign of the Egyptian kings and pharaohs, the notion of Pharaoh's self-notion as a divine being survived and is described in rabbinic literature. In these sources, the Pharaoh is described as hubristically asserting his own divinity and yet, compared to the one true God, is no more than an impotent human. Mekhilta of Rabbi Ishmael, Shirah 8:32 names Pharaoh among those who proclaimed themselves as gods, alongside Sennacherib and Nebuchadnezzar. Genesis Rabbah 89:3 invokes Pharaoh describing himself as the god over the Nile river. In Exodus Rabbah 10:2, Pharaoh boasts that he is the creator and owner of the Nile. God is then said to have responded to this statement by challenging the Pharaoh over who owns the Nile, as God proceeds to create a disaster by bringing forth frogs from it that consume Egypt's agriculture. In other midrashic texts, Pharaoh asserts himself as the creator of the universe and even of himself. In the Tanhuma, in commentary on Ezekiel 29:9, Pharaoh is said to have proclaimed himself as lord of the universe. Pharaoh is represented as a heretical figure who presents himself as divine, and these texts then claim that his claims were exposed when he had to go to the Nile to relieve himself.

== See also ==
- List of pharaohs
- Roman pharaoh
- Coronation of the pharaoh
- Curse of the pharaohs
- Egyptian chronology
- Pharaohs in the Bible

== Sources ==
- Charron, Alain (1990), "L'époque thinite", L'Égypte des millénaires obscures, Paris, pp. 77–97.
- Robins, Gay (2008). The Art of Ancient Egypt (revised ed.). Harvard University Press. ISBN 978-0-674-03065-7.
- Stevenson, Alice (2015). The Petrie Museum of Egyptian Archaeology: Characters and Collections. London: UCLPress. ISBN 978-1-910634-04-2.

Open access pdf download.

- Trope, Betsy Teasley; Quirke, Stephen; Lacovara, Peter (2005), Excavating Egypt: great discoveries from the Petrie Museum of Egyptian Archaeology, University College, London, Atlanta: Michael C. Carlos Museum, Emory University.
- Wilkinson, TAH (1999), Early Dynastic Egypt, London; New York: Routledge.
