= Pschent =

Ancient Egyptian double crown

- Pschent, the double crown of Egypt

Details
- Country: Ancient Egypt
- Predecessors: Deshret; Hedjet

The pschent (/pskʰént/; Greek ψχέντ) was the double crown worn by rulers in ancient Egypt. The ancient Egyptians generally referred to it as Pa-sekhemty (pꜣ-sḫm.ty), the Two Powerful Ones, from which the Greek term is derived. It combined the White Hedjet Crown of Upper Egypt and the Red Deshret Crown of Lower Egypt.

The Pschent represented the pharaoh's power over all of unified Egypt. It bore two animal emblems: an Egyptian cobra, known as the uraeus, ready to strike, which symbolized the Lower Egyptian goddess Wadjet; and a vulture representing the Upper Egyptian tutelary goddess Nekhbet. These were fastened to the front of the Pschent and referred to as the Two Ladies.

== History ==
S5 S6
Pschent
"Double Crown"
in hieroglyphs

The invention of the Pschent is generally attributed to the First Dynasty pharaoh Menes, but the first one known to wear a Double Crown was the First Dynasty pharaoh Djet: a rock inscription shows his Horus wearing it.

The king list on the Palermo Stone, which begins with the names of Lower Egyptian pharaohs (nowadays thought to have been mythological demigods), shown wearing the Red Crown, marks the unification of the country by giving the Pschent to all First Dynasty and later pharaohs. The Cairo fragment, on the other hand, shows these prehistoric rulers wearing the Pschent.

== Archaeology ==
As is the case with the Deshret and the Hedjet Crowns, no Pschent is currently known to have survived. It is known only from statuary, depictions, inscriptions, and ancient tales.

== Mythology ==
Among the deities sometimes depicted wearing the Double Crown are Horus and Atum or Ra both representing the pharaoh or having a special relationship to the pharaoh.

== Gallery ==
Modern drawing of the god Horus with a double crown

Same, but with a different variant of the double crown

Modern drawing of a pharaoh with a double crown

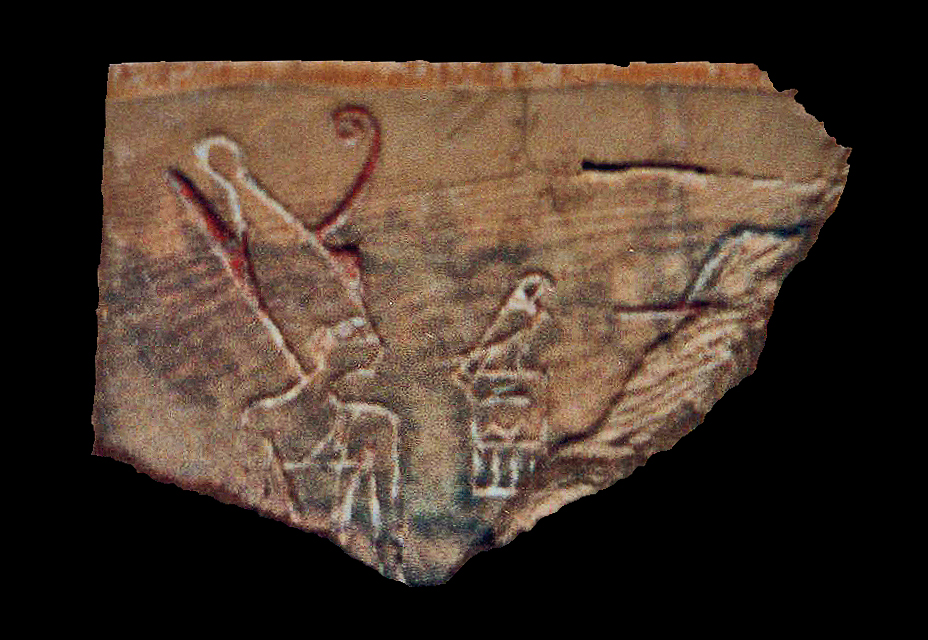
Fragment of an ivory label showing pharaoh Den wearing the double crown of Upper and Lower Egypt. Discovered in the tomb of Den at Umm El Qa'ab, now in the Egyptian Museum

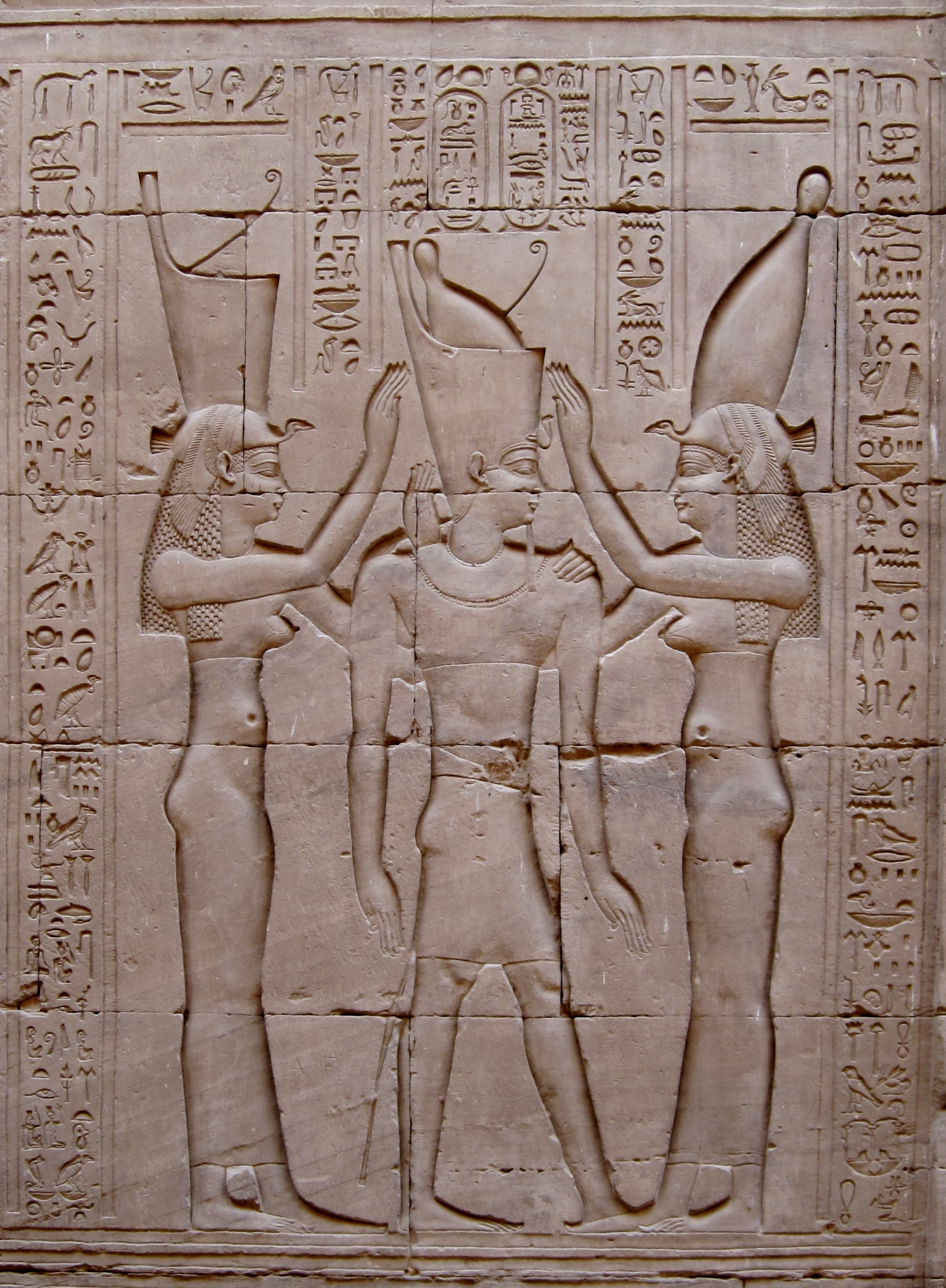
Pharaoh Ptolemy VIII between the goddesses Wadjet (symbolizing lower Egypt) and Nekhbet (symbolizing upper Egypt). Bas-relief on wall of Temple of Edfu, Egypt

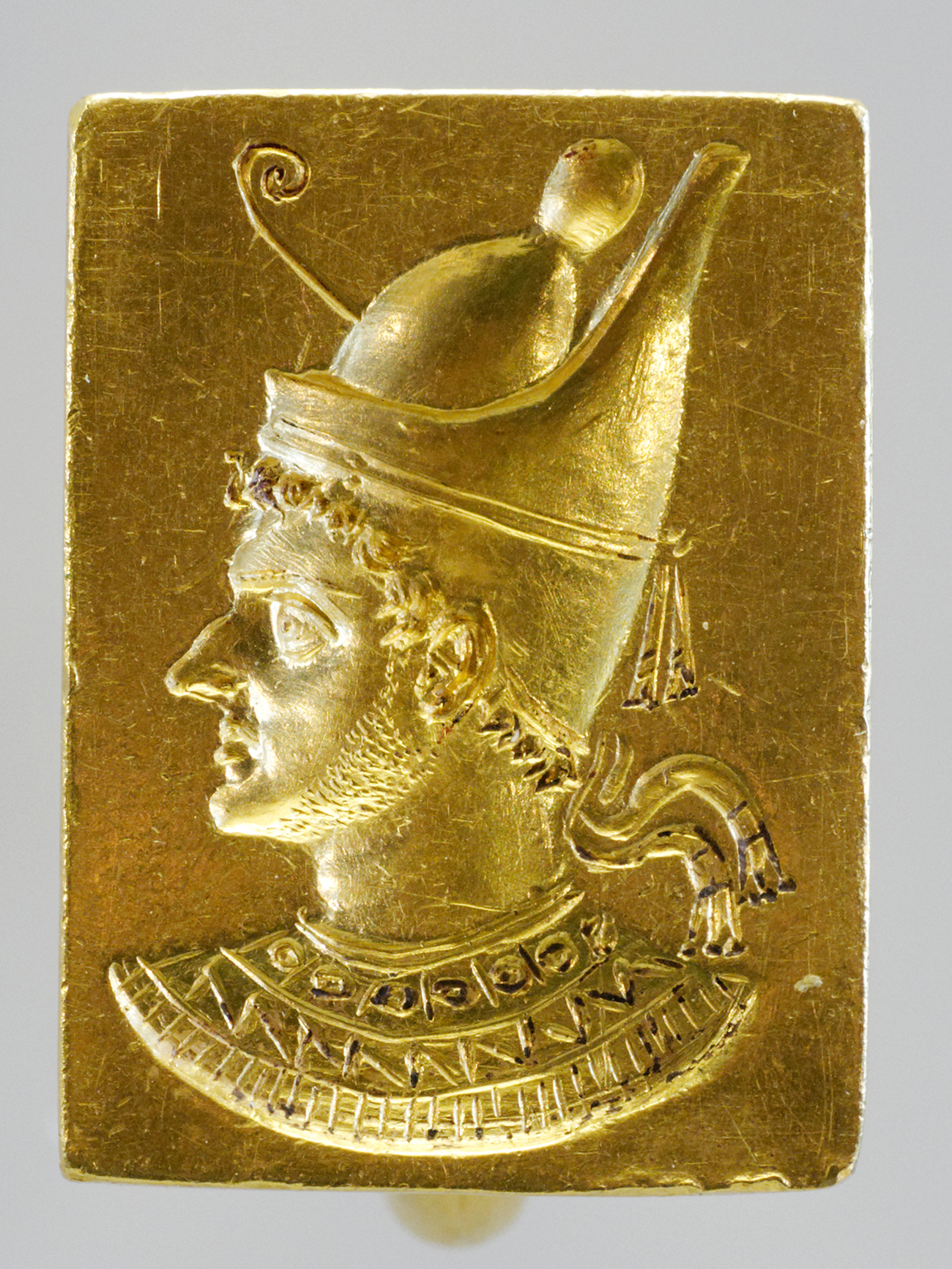
Ring of Ptolemy VI Philometor wearing the Pschent Double Crown, 3rd to 2nd Century BC. Ptolemaic rulers wore the Pschent in Egypt only and wore the Greek diadem in the other territories

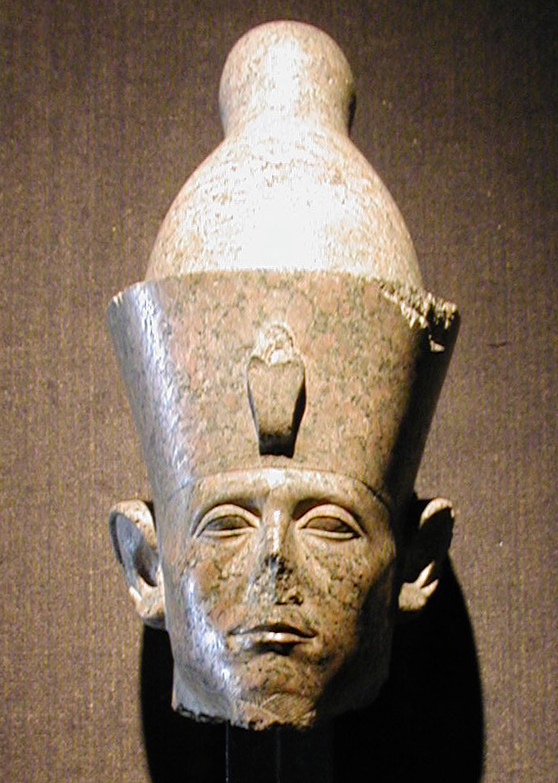
Statue head Senusret III wearing a pschent

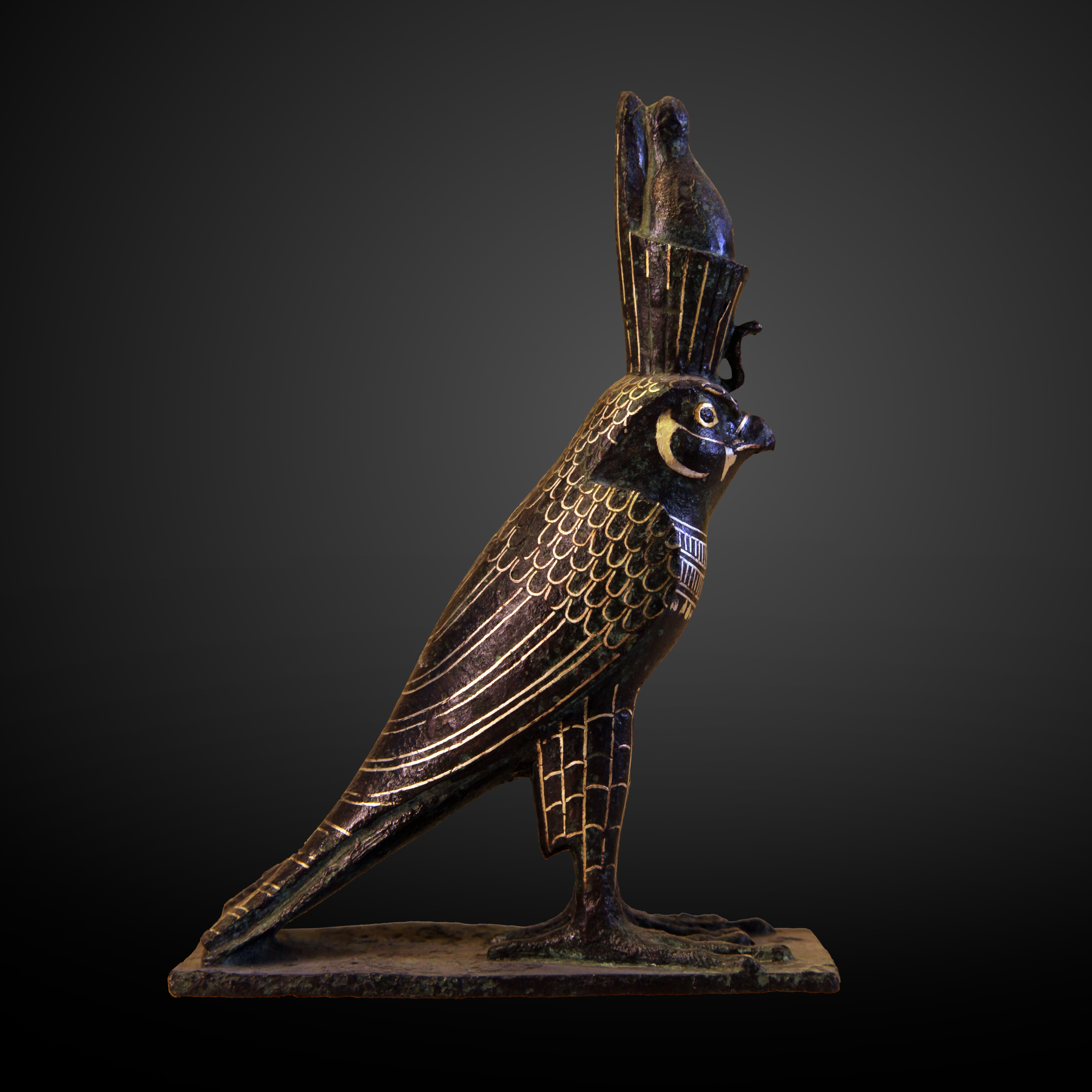
Horus falcon with Double Crown

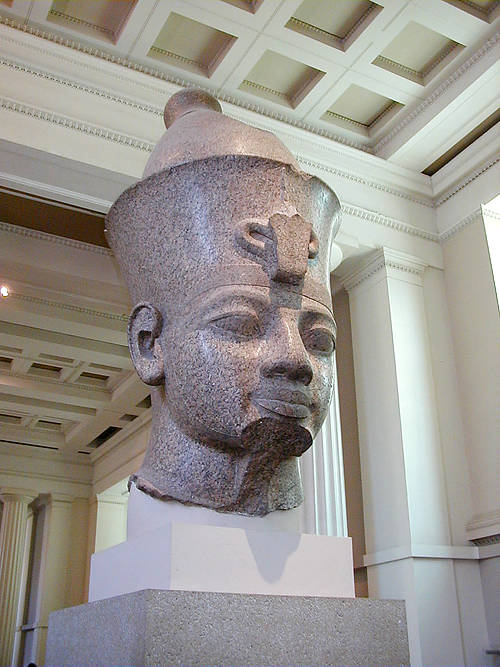
Statue of Amenhotep III wearing a pschent

== See also ==
- Atef – Hedjet Crown with feathers identified with Osiris
- Khepresh – Blue or War Crown also called Royal Crown
- N-red crown (n hieroglyph)
- N-water ripple (n hieroglyph)
- Uraeus – Rearing Cobra
