= Crowns of Egypt =

Any of various headdresses worn in Pharaonic Egypt

The Egyptian civilization used a number of different crowns throughout its existence. Some were used to show authority, while others were used for religious ceremonies. Each crown was worn by different Pharaohs or deities, and each crown had its own significance and symbolic meaning. In early Egypt, one significant and important characteristic of the many crowns was the color white. The color symbolized kingship or nisut in the early periods and Upper Egypt. The color blue was also an important color from the 18th Dynasty on. The crowns include the Atef, the Deshret, the Hedjet, the Khepresh, the Pschent, and the Hemhem.

== List of crowns of Egypt ==
Image	Name	Components	Worn by	In art
	Atef	Hedjet with ostrich feathers and sometimes Uraeus and ram horns	Osiris and some other gods.	Osiris from the tomb of Nefertari (c. 1295–1255 B.C.E.)
	Cap crown	Skullcap, band, streamers and Uraeus	Nobility and Pharaohs, typically	The Wilbour Plaque,c. 1352–1336 B.C.E., Brooklyn Museum 16.48, probably depicting Akhenaten and Nefertiti. On the left, the Pharaoh wears the Khat headdress, and on the right, the queen wears the Cap crown.
	Deshret (Red crown)	Uraeus	Pharaohs of Lower Egypt and the desert Red Land; the deities Horus, Wadjet and Neith	Lion Slayer, New Kingdom (dynasties 19–20), ostracon
	Hedjet (White crown)	Vulture	Pharaohs of Upper Egypt; the deities Horus and Nekhbet	Ahmose I or Amenhotep I (Dynasty 18, c. 1539–1493 B.C.E.)
	Hemhem crown	Hedjet, Uraeus and ram horns	Non-Egyptian rulers, certain gods	A winged figure in Elamite robes, likely Cyrus the Great wearing a Hemhem crown
	Khat	Bands and Uraeus	Nobility and Pharaohs, typically	The Wilbour Plaque, c. 1352–1336 B.C.E., Brooklyn Museum 16.48, probably depicting Akhenaten and Nefertiti. On the left, the Pharaoh wears the Khat headdress, and on the right, the queen wears the Cap crown.
	Khepresh (Blue crown or War crown)	Uraeus	New Kingdom Pharaohs in battle and ceremonies	A ushabti of Tutankhamun (Dynasty 18 c. 1332 – 1323 B.C.E.)
	Nemes	lappets, band and Uraeus	Pharaohs, typically	Amenhotep II wearing a Nemes, KV35, Valley of the Kings, c. 1427–1401 B.C.E.
	Pschent, Greek ψχεντ, Egyptian sḫm.tỉ, sekhemti (Double crown)	Deshret and Hedjet; Uraeus and Vulture	Pharaohs, and Horus	Ptolemy VI Philometor (c. 3rd–2nd century B.C.E.), engraving on a ring
	Shuti crown	ram horns, feathers and Uraeus	Egyptian gods, typically	Seti I perform rituals before the god Amun who is wearing the Shuti crown. From the Temple of Seti I at Abydos.
	Vulture crown	Vulture	Egyptian queens, typically	Tomb wall depicting Queen Nefertari, the great royal wife of Pharaoh Rameses II

== Cap crown ==
Attested as early as the Old Kingdom, the Cap crown is most commonly associated with the Dynasty 25 Kushite Pharaohs, who are frequently depicted wearing the crown with two uraei. In that era, the crown was referred to as a sdn. The remnants of what appears to be a Cap crown (JE 62699) were found on the mummy of Tutankhamun. Tutankhamun's crown consisted of a band of gold wrapped around the Pharaoh's temples that secured a linen skullcap, which had mostly decayed by the time of the tomb's excavation. The gold band was itself kept in place by a ribbon tied into a bow at the back of the head. Still remaining and mounted on the skullcap are four uraei made of gold beads and red and blue glass beads. In the center of each Uraeus is a gold cartouche containing the name of the Aten. The skullcap portion of the crown resembles, and was likely associated with, the skullcap worn by the deity Ptah.

== See also ==
- Crown of justification
- Radiant crown
- Modius (headdress)
