= Vulture crown =

Ancient Egyptian crown

- The vulture crown

Details
- Country: Ancient Egypt

The Vulture crown was an ancient Egyptian crown worn by Great Royal Wives and female pharaohs. It was depicted as a headdress in the shape of a vulture draped over the head, with its wings hanging down on the sides. It was a symbol of protection associated with the vulture goddess Nekhbet, who often wore this crown when depicted in a human form. These crowns were frequently worn by the Great Royal Wife, high ranking priestesses, and female pharaohs. These crowns were also sometimes equipped with the Uraeus to symbolize Wadjet, representing both Upper (Nekhbet) and Lower Egypt (Wadjet).

== History ==
The vulture crown was initially only seen in depictions of goddesses. From the Fifth Dynasty onwards, however, queens began to wear the headdress regularly as part of their iconography. The association of Nekhbet with the queen stemmed from the vulture's symbolism of motherhood; the hieroglyph for the vulture, mwt, was used to write the word for "mother". Because Nekhbet was a protector goddess, the queen's affiliation with her complemented the king's role as the embodiment of the falcon god Horus.

Khentkaus II was one of the first queens to wear the vulture headdress. In the New Kingdom, the vulture's head on the crown was more frequently replaced by the uraeus.

== Gallery ==
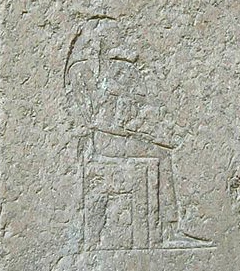
A relief of Khentkaus I sitting on the throne with a faint Vulture crown, Fifth Dynasty, Pyramid of Khentkaus I, Giza

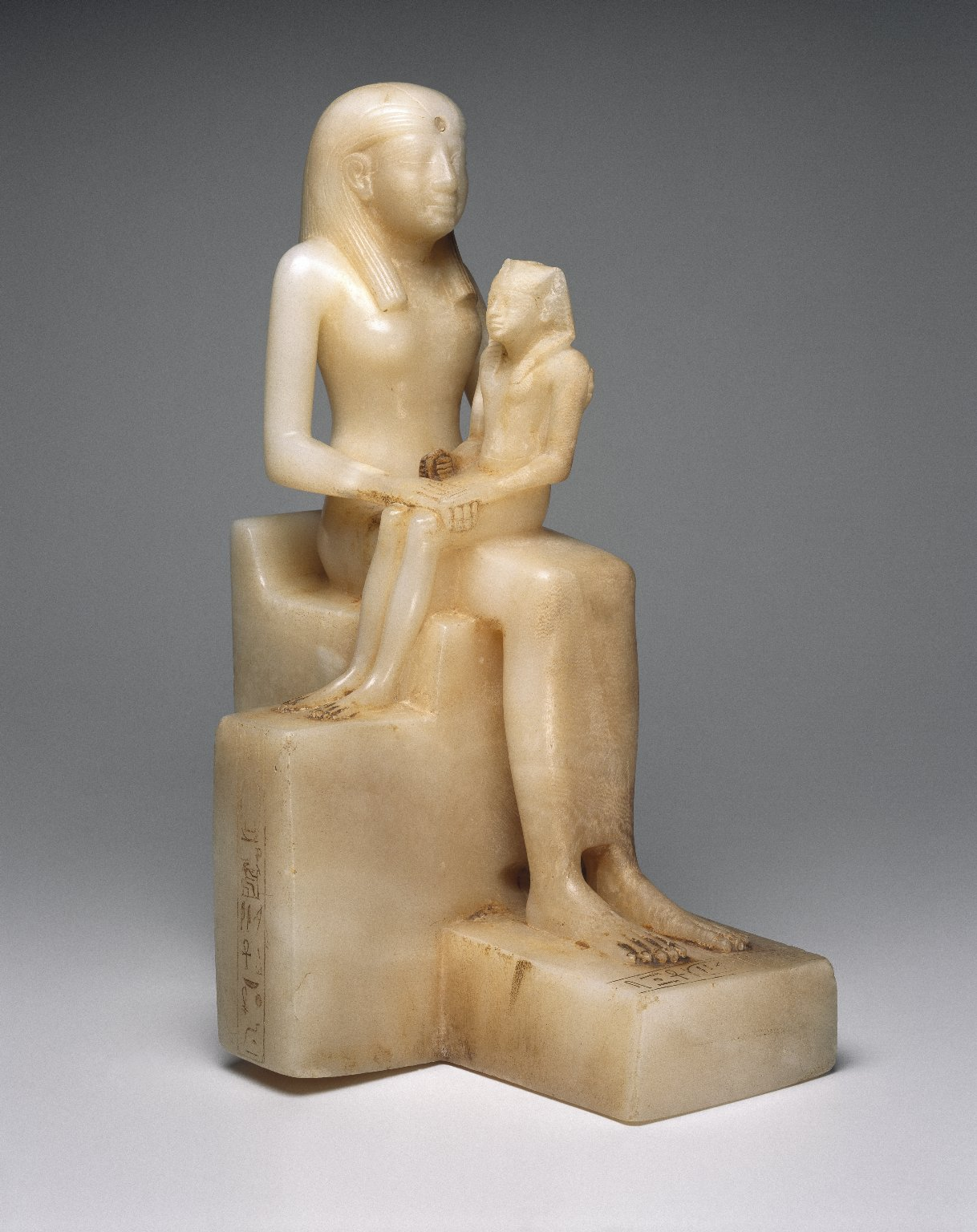
Ankhesenpepi II wearing a vulture crown while her son, the pharaoh Pepi II, sits on her lap. Sixth Dynasty (ca. 2288-2224 BCE), Egyptian alabaster, Brooklyn Museum

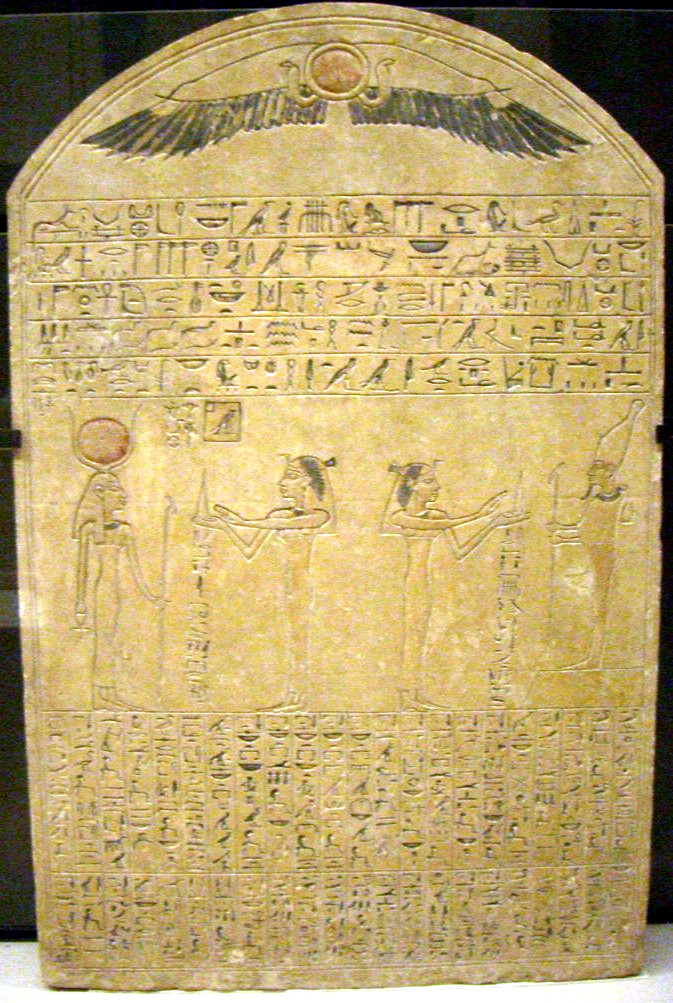
Stela of queen Nubkhaes of the Thirteenth Dynasty in which she is depicted giving offerings to Hathor and Osiris, Louvre Museum, Paris

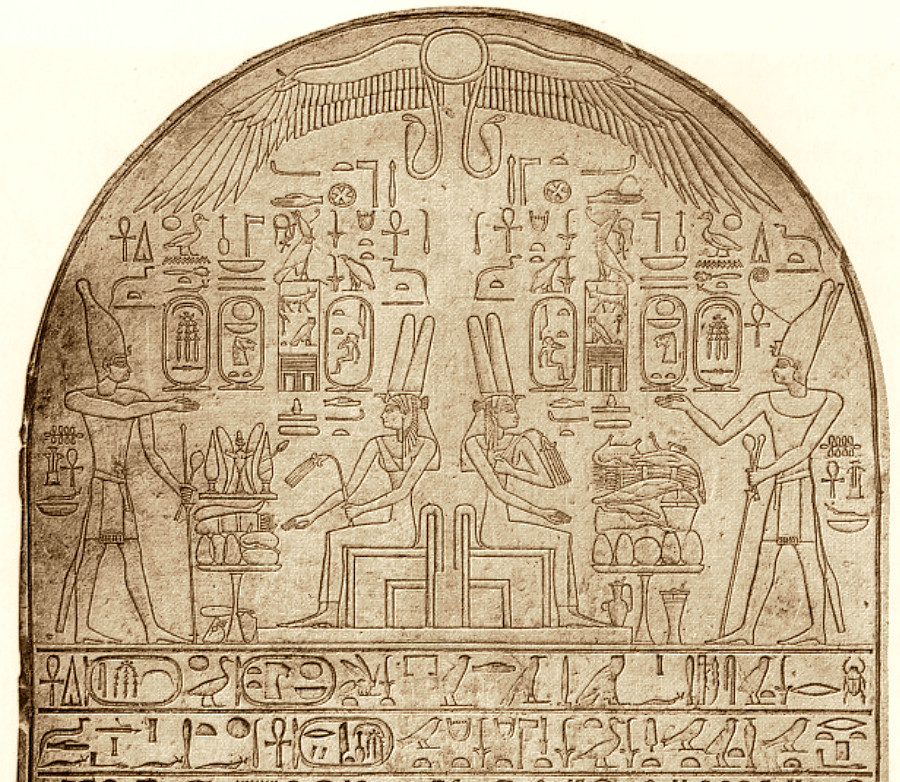
Stela honoring Tetisheri, grandmother of Ahmose I, from Abydos. Eighteenth Dynasty, Egyptian Museum in Cairo

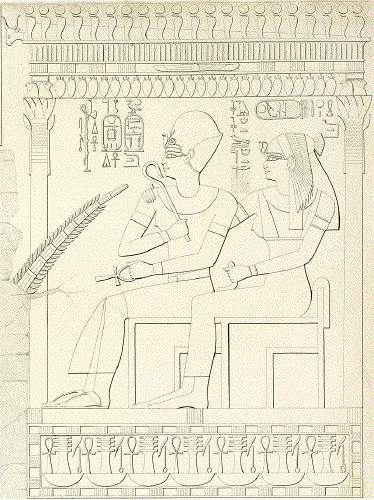
Sketch of a painting from a tomb in Sheikh Abd el-Qurna depicting Merytre-Hatshepsut with her husband Thutmose III, Eighteenth Dynasty

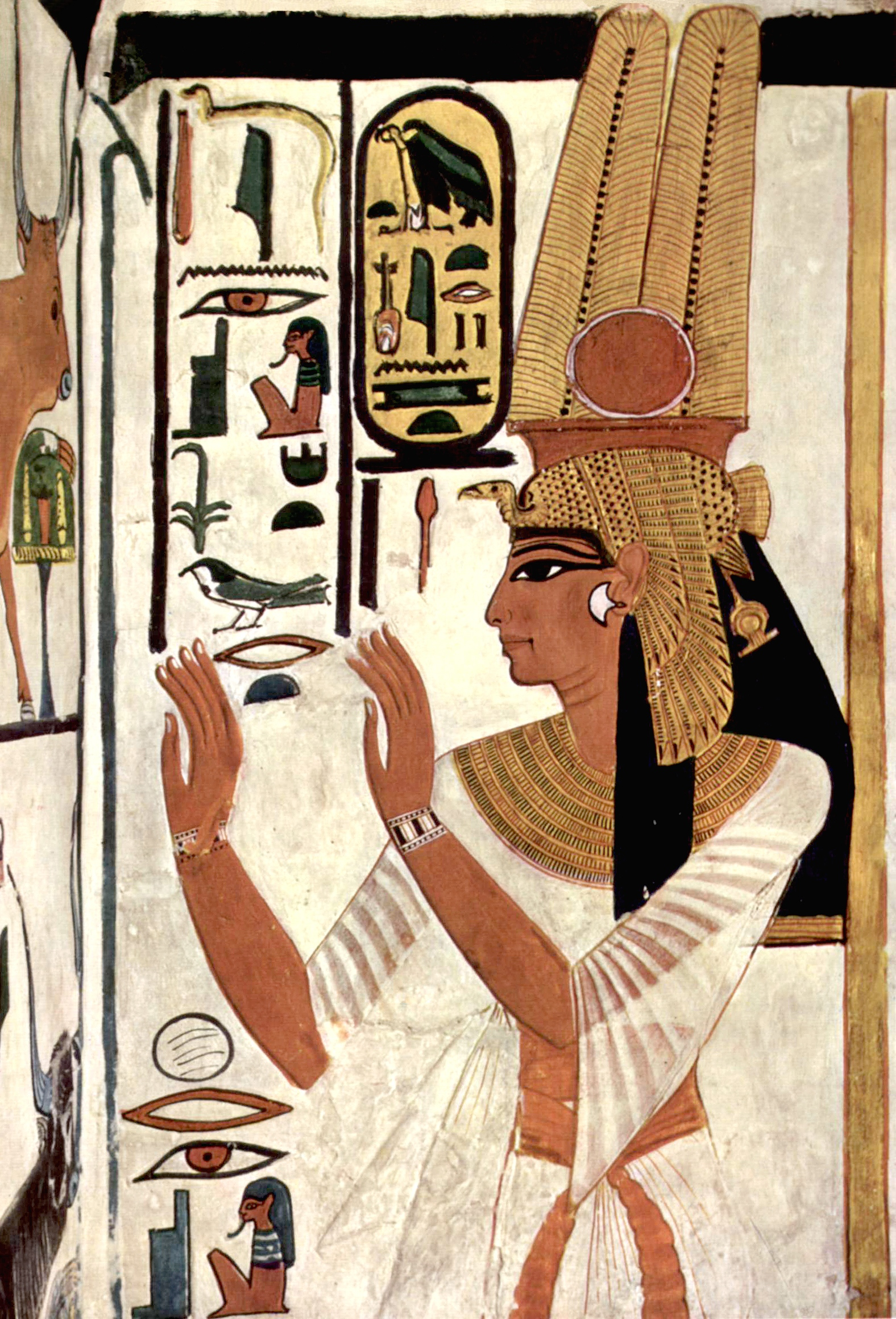
Nefertari, wife of Ramesses II, wearing a vulture crown along with plumes and a sun disk, Nineteenth Dynasty (c. 1255 BCE), QV66, Valley of the Queens, Luxor

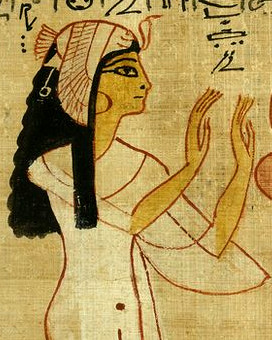
Nodjmet, wife of the High Priest of Amun Herihor, wearing a vulture crown. Book of the Dead of Nodjmet, Twenty-first Dynasty (c. 1064 BCE)

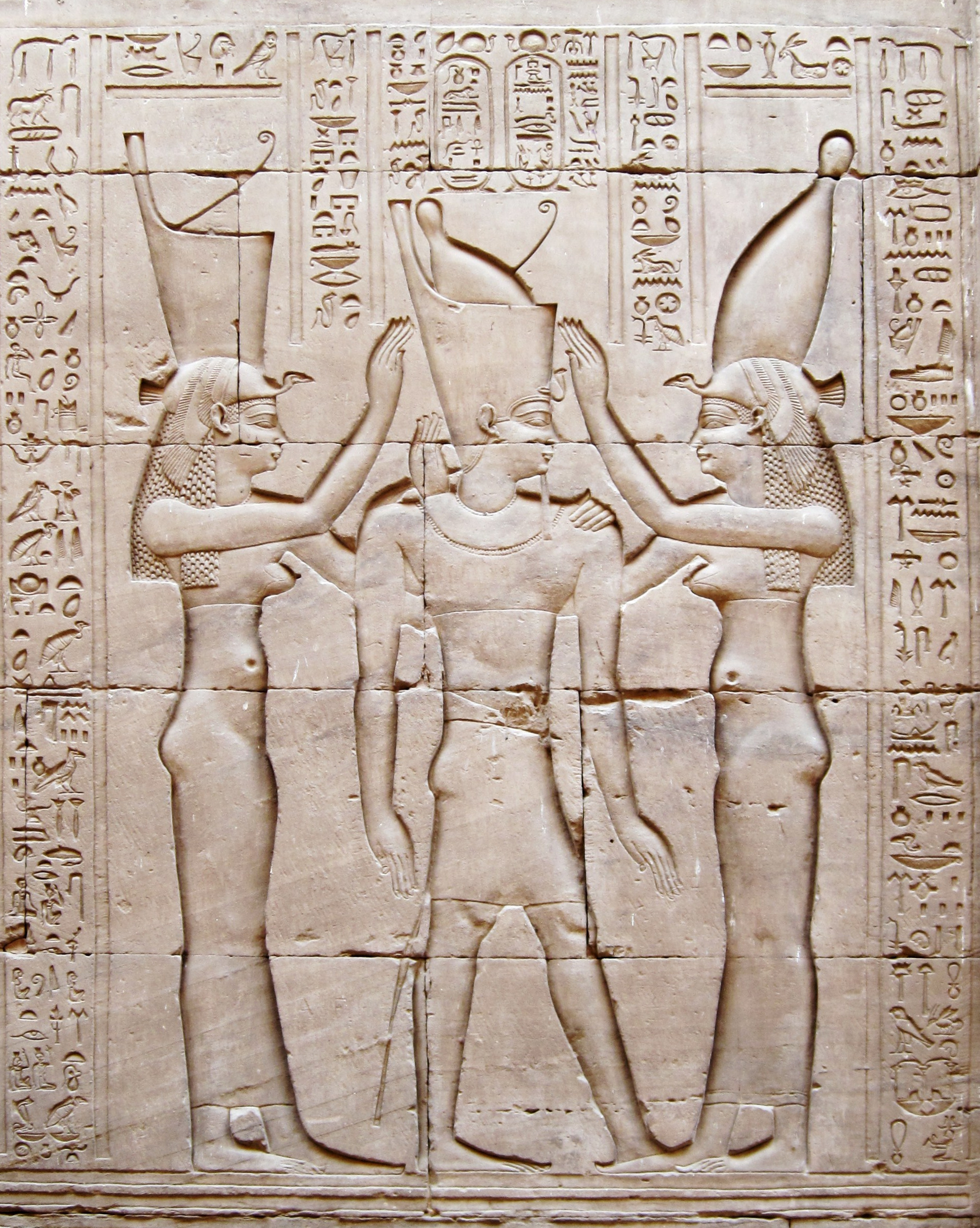
The goddesses Wadjet and Nekhbet wearing Vulture crowns along with the Deshret and Hedjet respectively while crowning Ptolemy XIII, Ptolemaic period, Temple of Edfu
