= Upper and Lower Egypt =

Two regions of Ancient Egypt

In Egyptian history, the Upper and Lower Egypt period (also known as The Two Lands) was the final stage of prehistoric Egypt and directly preceded the unification of the realm. The conception of Egypt as the Two Lands (Upper and Lower) was an example of the dualism in ancient Egyptian culture and frequently appeared in texts and imagery, including in the titles of Egyptian pharaohs.

The Egyptian title zmꜣ-tꜣwj (Egyptological pronunciation sema-tawy) is usually translated as "Uniter of the Two Lands" and was depicted as a human trachea entwined with the papyrus and lily plant. The trachea stood for unification, while the papyrus and lily plant represent Lower and Upper Egypt.

Standard titles of the pharaoh included the prenomen, quite literally "Of the Sedge and Bee" (nswt-bjtj, the symbols of Upper and Lower Egypt) and "lord of the Two Lands" (written nb-tꜣwj). Queens regnant were addressed as pharaohs and male. Queens consort might use the feminine versions of the second title, "lady of The Two Lands" (nbt-tꜣwj), "mistress of the Entire Two Lands" (hnwt-tꜣwy-tm), and "mistress of the Two Lands" (hnwt-tꜣwy).

== Structure ==
Pschent, the double crown of Egypt

Ancient Egypt was divided into two regions, namely Upper Egypt and Lower Egypt. To the north was Lower Egypt, where the Nile stretched out with its several branches to form the Nile Delta. To the south was Upper Egypt, stretching to Aswan. The terminology "Upper" and "Lower" derives from the flow of the Nile from the highlands of East Africa northwards to the Mediterranean Sea.

The two kingdoms of Upper and Lower Egypt were united c. 3000 BC, but each maintained its own regalia: the hedjet or White Crown for Upper Egypt and the deshret or Red Crown for Lower Egypt. Thus, the pharaohs were known as the rulers of the Two Lands, and wore the pschent, a double crown, each half representing sovereignty of one of the kingdoms. Ancient Egyptian tradition credited Menes, now believed to be the same as Narmer, as the king who united Upper and Lower Egypt. On the Narmer Palette, the king is depicted wearing the Red Crown on one scene and the White crown in another, and thereby showing his rule over both Lands.

== Sema Tawy and symbolism ==
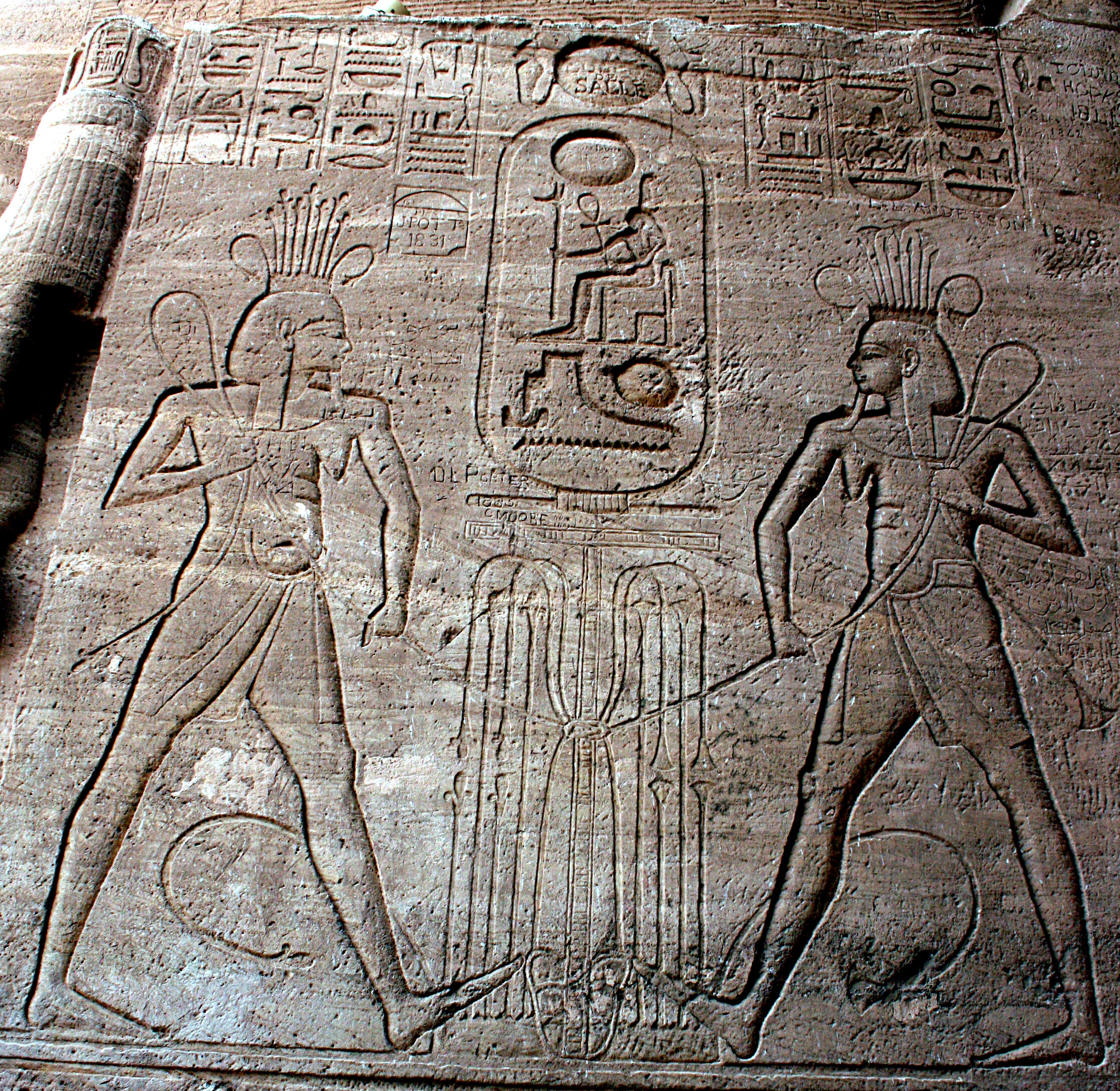
Hapi tying the papyrus and reed plants in the sema tawy symbol for the unification of Upper and Lower Egypt

The union of Upper and Lower Egypt is symbolized by knotted papyrus and reed plants. This binding motif represents both harmony through unity and domination through containment. Duality plays a key role in royal iconography and is sometimes extended further depicting the knotted plants binding foreign enemies from both the North and the South.

During the first dynasty, dualistic royal titles emerge, including the King of Upper and Lower Egypt (nswt bjtj) title which combines the plant representing Upper Egypt and a bee representing Lower Egypt. The other dualistic title is the Two Ladies name or Nebty name. The two ladies are Nekhbet, the vulture goddess associated with Nekhen in Upper Egypt, and Wadjet, the cobra goddess associated with Buto in Lower Egypt.

There are many depictions of the ritual unifications of the Two Lands. It is not known if this was perhaps a rite that would have been enacted at the beginning of a reign, or merely a symbolic representation. Many of the depictions of the unification show two gods binding the plants. Often the gods are Horus and Set, or on occasion Horus and Thoth. There are several examples of Barque stands from the reigns of Amenhotep III (Hermopolis), Taharqa (Jebel Barkal), and Atlanersa (Jebel Barkal) that show two river gods performing the rite. This matches a scene from the Temple at Abu Simbel from the time of Ramesses II.

There are only a handful of scenes that show the King himself performing the ritual. All of these are from barque stands and date to the reigns of Amenhotep III, Seti I and Ramesses III. The latter two may be copies of the first one.

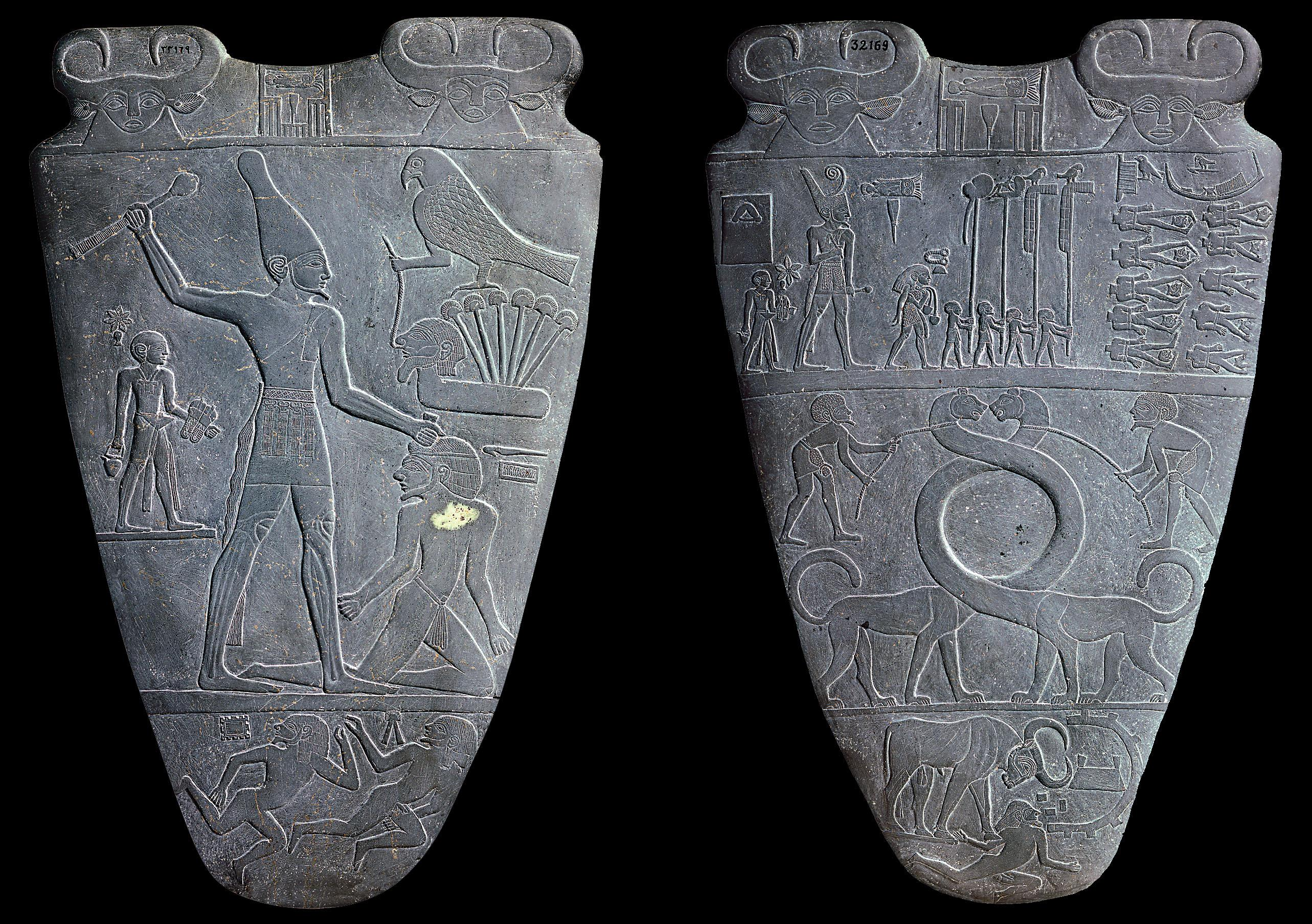
The Narmer Palette depicts the unification of the Two Lands.

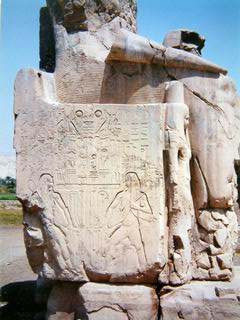
The river god Hapi uniting Upper and Lower Egypt. Colossi of Memnon. Reign of Amenhotep III.

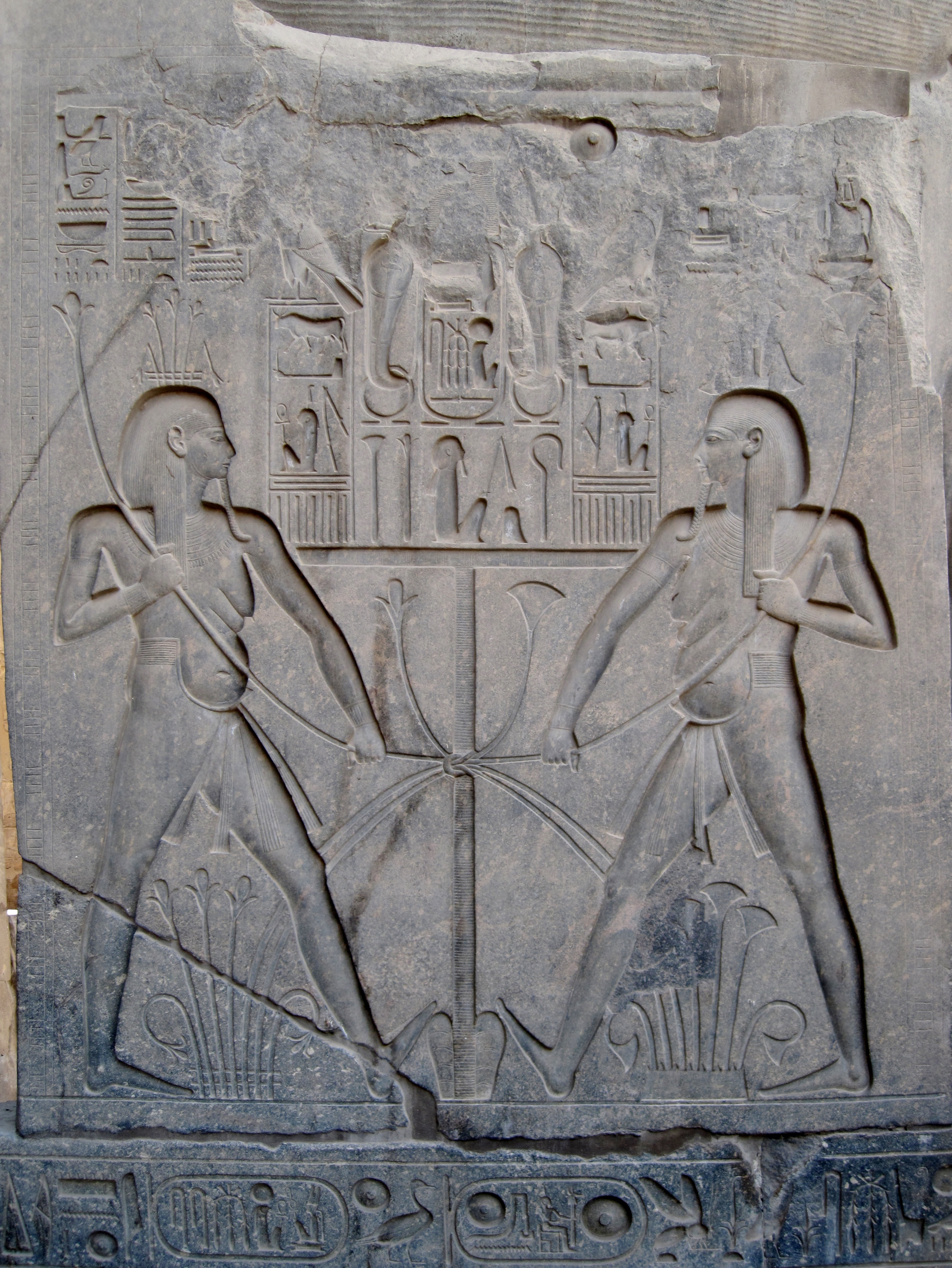
Temple scene at Luxor, Thebes

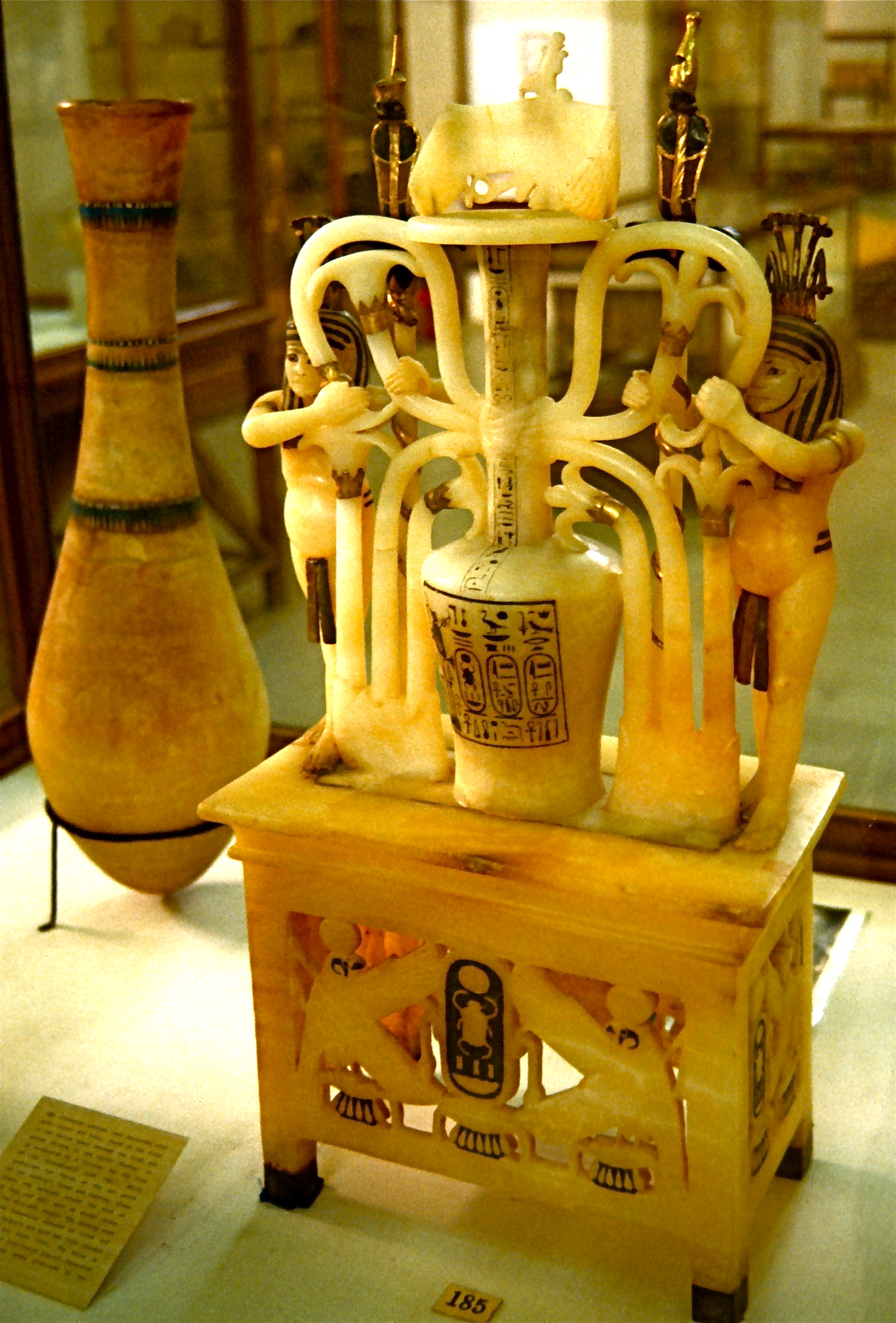
Alabaster jar depicting the sema tawy symbol with Hapy. From the tomb of Tutankhamun.

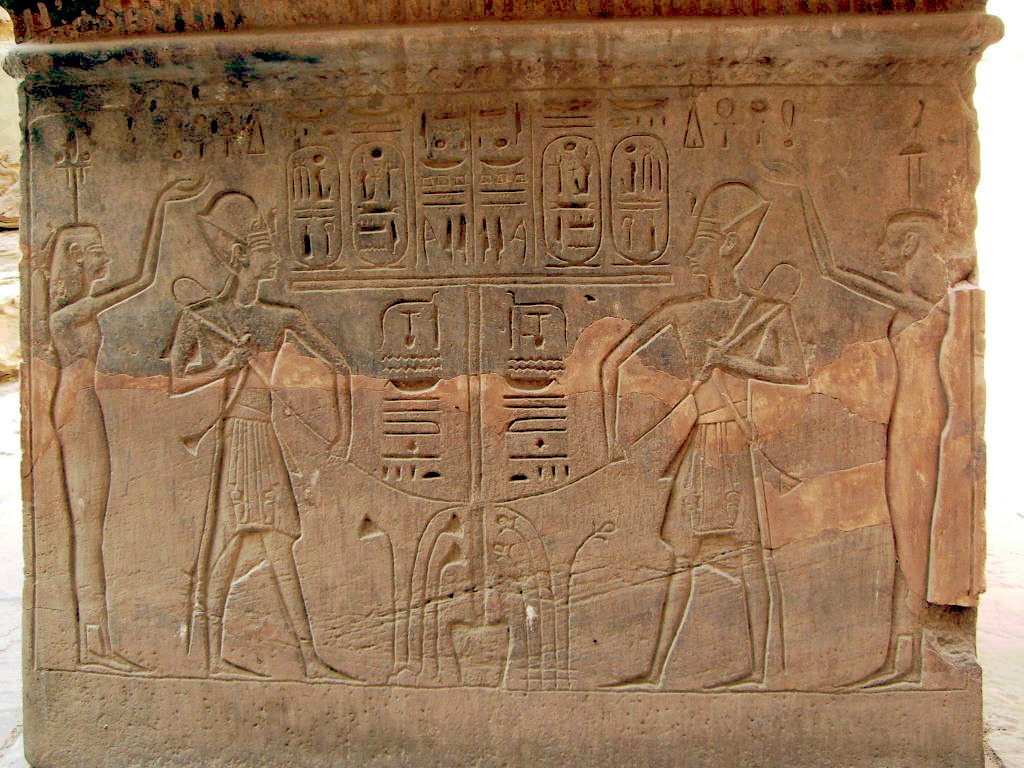
Ramesses III at the temple of Khonsu.

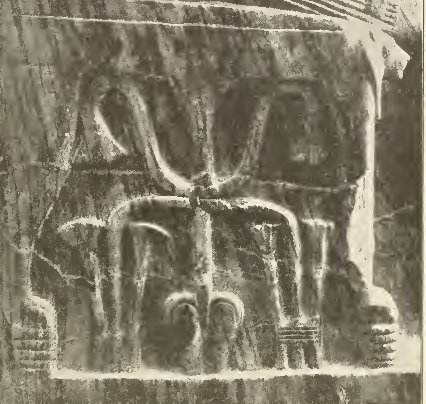
Sema tawy (without deities) on the side of the throne of Khafre

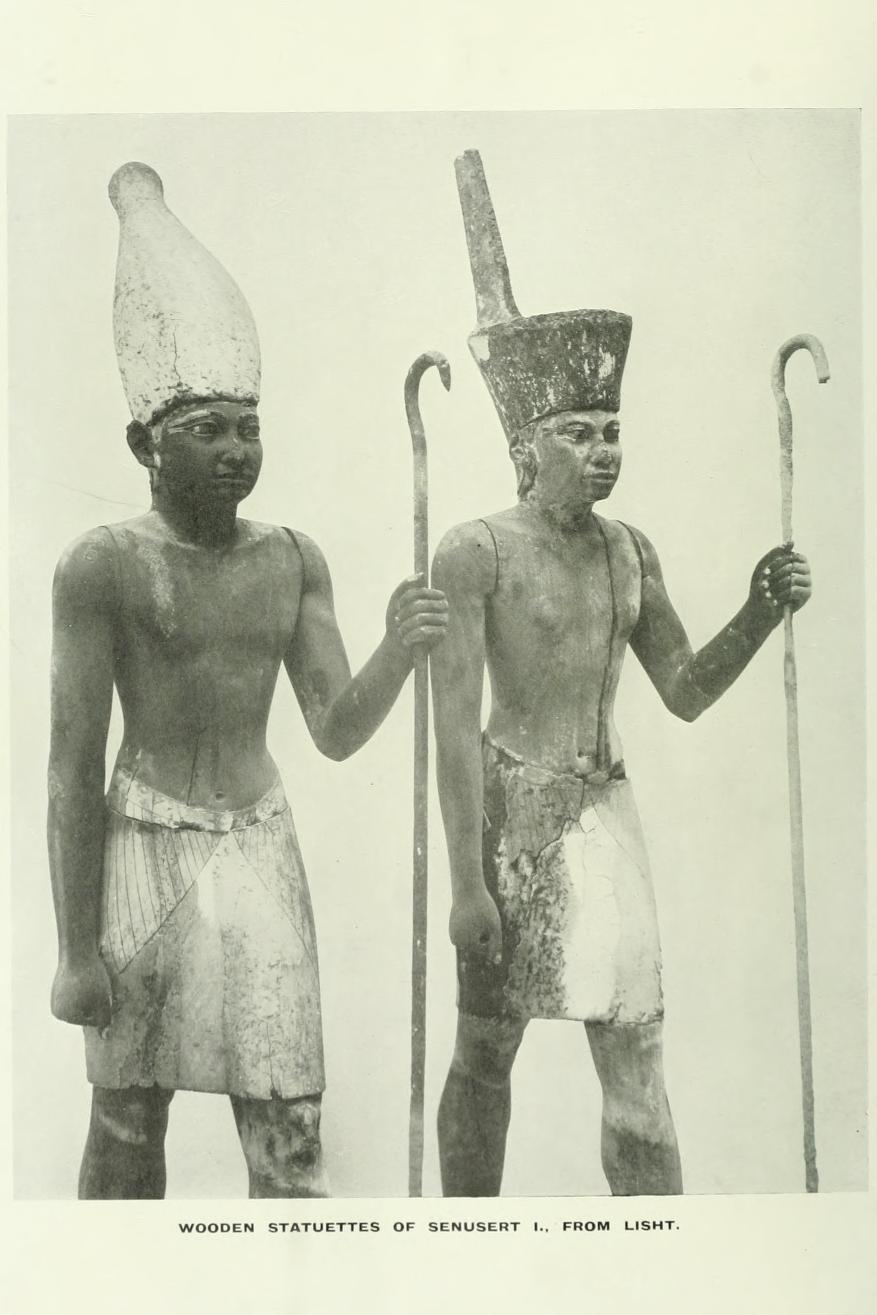
A couple of statuettes which represent a Middle Kingdom pharaoh as King of Upper Egypt (left, with the white crown) and King of Lower Egypt (right, with the red crown); wood, from el-Lisht, 12th dynasty, Middle Kingdom (Egyptian Museum, main floor, room 22, JE44951)

== See also ==
- History of ancient Egypt
- Narmer
- Two Ladies
- Tauhid (album)

== Sources ==
- Charron, Alain (1990), "L'époque thinite", L'Égypte des millénaires obscures, Paris, pp. 77–97.
- Robins, Gay (2008). The Art of Ancient Egypt (revised ed.). Harvard University Press. ISBN 978-0-674-03065-7.
- Stevenson, Alice (2015). The Petrie Museum of Egyptian Archaeology: Characters and Collections. London: UCLPress. ISBN 978-1-910634-04-2.

Open access pdf download.

- Trope, Betsy Teasley; Quirke, Stephen; Lacovara, Peter (2005), Excavating Egypt: great discoveries from the Petrie Museum of Egyptian Archaeology, University College, London, Atlanta: Michael C. Carlos Museum, Emory University.
- Wilkinson, TAH (1999), Early Dynastic Egypt, London; New York: Routledge.
