= Uraeus =

Ancient Egyptian upright cobra motif signifying authority and divinity

Drawing of a Uraeus

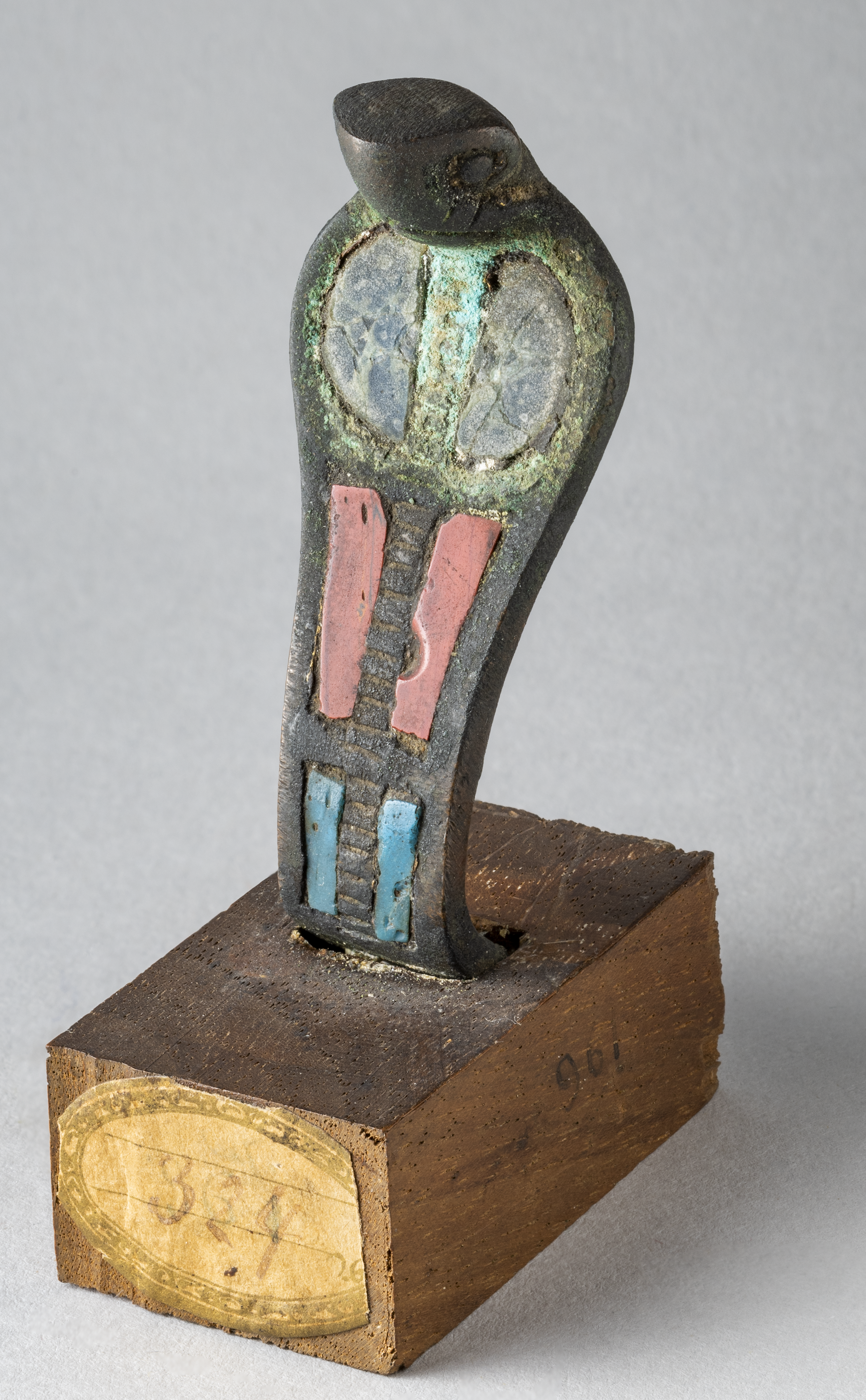
Statuette of a uraeus, between 722 and 332 BC. Late Period. Museo Egizio Turin.

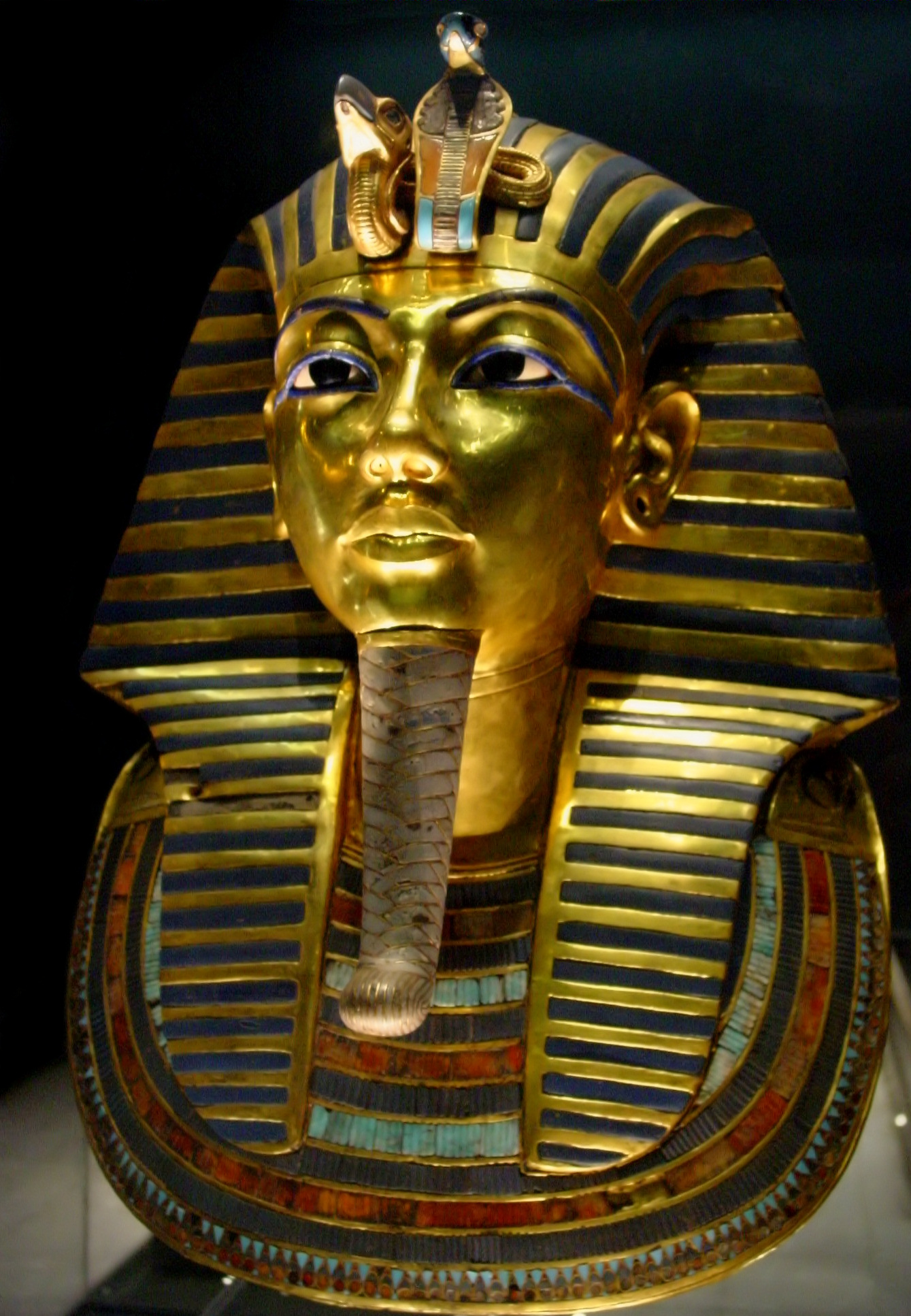
Mask of Tutankhamun's mummy featuring a uraeus, from the Eighteenth Dynasty. The cobra image of Wadjet with the vulture image of Nekhbet represent the unification of Lower and Upper Egypt.

The uraeus (/jʊəˈriːəs/) or ouraeus (Ancient Greek: Οὐραῖος, Greek pronunciation: [uraː.îos]; Egyptian: jꜥrt, "rearing cobra", plural: uraei) is the stylized, upright form of an Egyptian cobra, used as a symbol of sovereignty, royalty, deity and divine authority in ancient Egypt.

== Symbolism ==
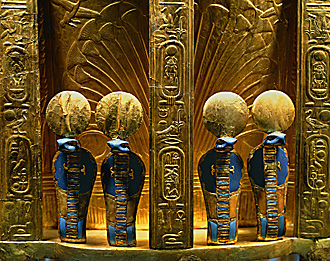
Four golden uraei cobra figures, bearing sun disks on their heads, on the reverse side of the throne of Pharaoh Tutankhamun (1346–1337 BC). Valley of the Kings, Thebes, New Kingdom (18th Dynasty)

The uraeus is a symbol for the goddess Wadjet. She was one of the earliest Egyptian deities and was often depicted as a cobra, as she is the serpent goddess. The center of her cult was in Per-Wadjet, later called Buto by the Greeks. She became the patroness of the Nile Delta and the protectress of all of Lower Egypt. The pharaohs wore the uraeus as a head ornament: either with the body of Wadjet atop the head, or as a crown encircling the head; this indicated Wadjet's protection and reinforced the pharaoh's claim over the land. In whatever manner that the uraeus was displayed upon the pharaoh's head, it was, in effect, part of the pharaoh's crown. The pharaoh was recognized only by wearing the uraeus, which conveyed legitimacy to the ruler. There is evidence for this tradition even in the Old Kingdom during the third millennium BCE. Several goddesses associated with or being considered aspects of Wadjet are depicted wearing the uraeus as well.

At the time of the unification of Egypt, the image of Nekhbet, the goddess who was represented as a white vulture and held the same position as the patron of Upper Egypt, joined the image of Wadjet on the uraeus that would encircle the crown of the pharaohs who ruled the unified Egypt. The importance of their separate cults kept them from becoming merged as with so many Egyptian deities. Together, they were known as the Nebty or the Two Ladies, who became the joint protectors and patrons of the unified Egypt.

Later, the pharaohs were seen as a manifestation of the sun god Ra, and so it also was believed that the uraeus protected them by spitting fire on their enemies from the fiery eye of the goddess. In some mythological works, the eyes of Ra are said to be uraei.

== Gold uraeus of Senusret II ==
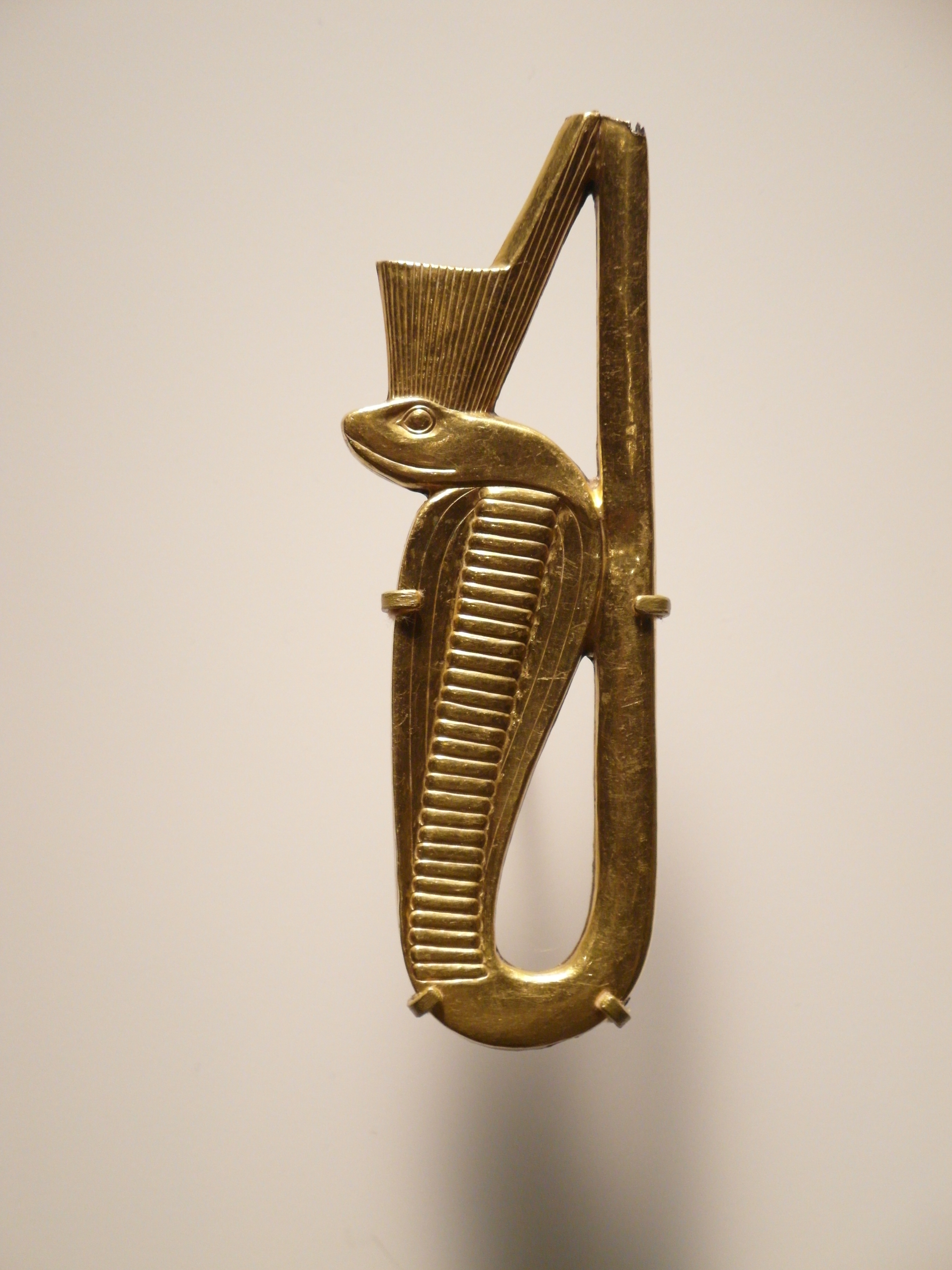
Uraeus with the Red Crown of Lower Egypt. Late Period of Egypt, 664–332 BC

In 1919, after only a half-hour of excavation, the Qufti worker Hosni Ibrahim held in his hands the gold uraeus of Senusret II. It had been decided to make a (follow-up) "complete clearance" of the El-Lahun Pyramid's rooms at Saqqara. The start in the rock-cut offering chamber, leading from the tomb, on the south, immediately revealed in the turnover of the six inches of debris, the golden uraeus crown ornament.

Before Tutankhamun's tomb was found in 1922, this golden uraeus was the only ornament ever known to be worn by an entombed pharaoh, and it was thought that it was passed to the next pharaoh.

This uraeus is of solid gold, 6.7 cm (2.6 in), black eyes of granite, a snake head of deep ultramarine lapis lazuli, the flared cobra hood of dark carnelian inlays, and inlays of turquoise. To mount it on the pharaoh's crown, two loops in the rear-supporting tail of the cobra provide the attachment points.

== As a hieroglyph ==
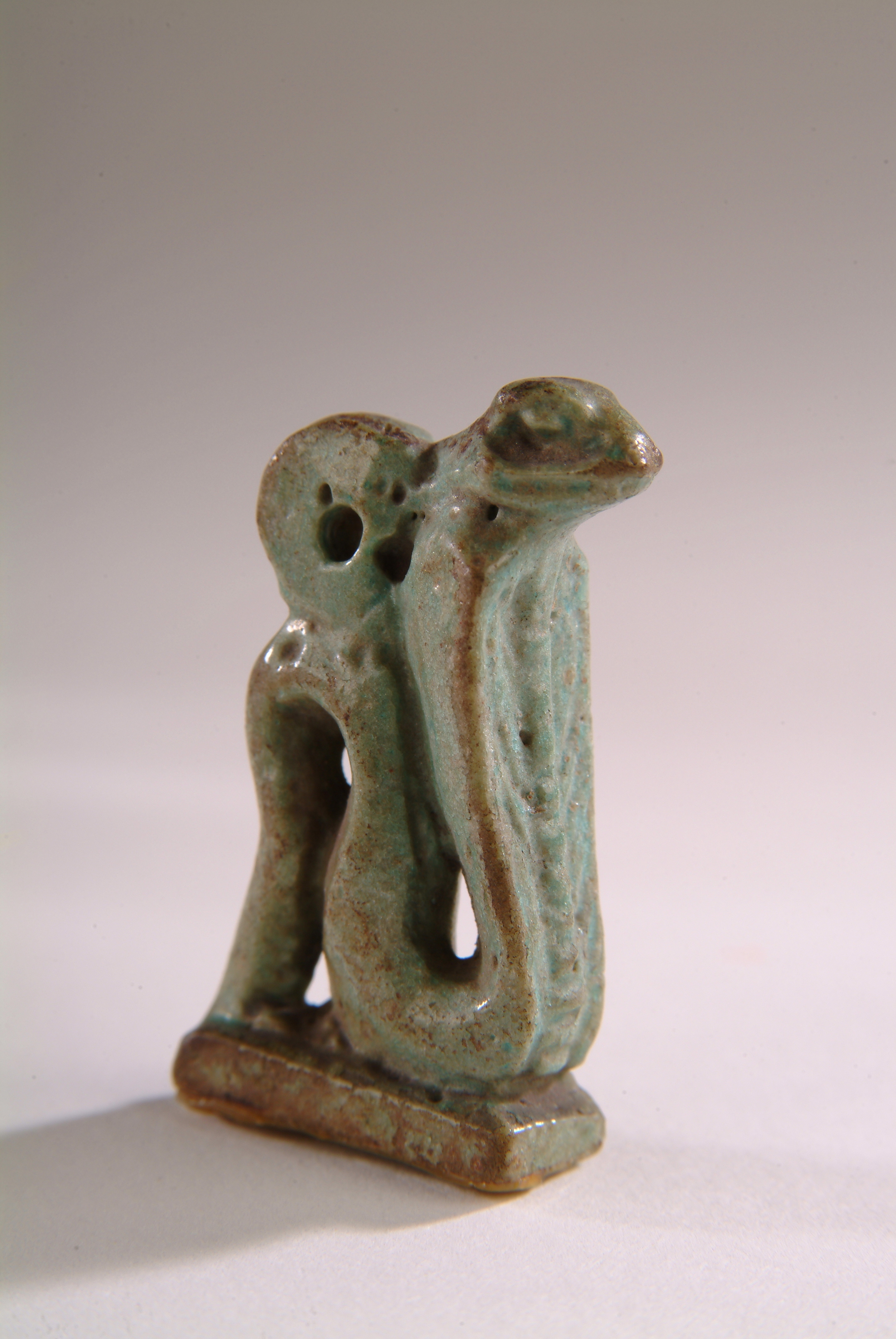
Green glazed cobra amulet in the form of a uraeus

Besides the uraeus being used as an ornament for statuary or as an adornment on the pharaoh, it also was used for jewellery and in amulets. However, another important use is as the hieroglyph.

For uraeus ornament as a mummy grave example, See: Djedptahiufankh, High Priest of 21st Dynasty, Shoshenq I.

I12 I13 R9 R9 R9
Uraeus—
Uraeus on Basket
Ntr + Cobra
in hieroglyphs

The simplest hieroglyph is the "Cobra" (the Uraeus); however there are subcategories, referring to: a goddess, a priestess, the goddess Menhit, the shrine of the goddess (àter), the goddess Isis, and lastly goddess: (Cobra (Uraeus) at base of deity (ntr)).

The Rosetta Stone uses the plural of the last example, "3 × "god flag" with Cobra at each base of flag". The story of the Rosetta Stone has the king (the priests of the king) listing his reasons for being honored, and in return, "The Gods and Goddesses (plural)" reward him. The last two-thirds of the Rosetta Stone relates how he will be honored, including erecting the Rosetta Stone, for all to read.

O16 O17
Uraeus on buildings
in hieroglyphs

Another example of the hieroglyph usage is as adornments upon the hieroglyph for "shrine", and also for "buildings".

== The Blue Crown ==
Before the New Kingdom Period, the body of the uraeus coiled around in circles behind its raised head on the Blue Crown. The king is most often depicted wearing the Blue Crown in combat and the aftermath of combat scenes. Additionally, the smaller scale king usually wore the Blue Crown when depicted in a protective group of deities. Colossal statues of the king wearing a Blue Crown are extremely rare; the typical royal statue also does not feature a Blue Crown. Also, depictions of the Blue Crown with its uraeus does not decorate royal tombs until late in the Ramesside Period. The deity-on-earth king was thought to require extra protection in his mortal form, emphasizing the protective qualities of the uraeus. The uraeus was usually crafted from precious metals, most commonly gold and less frequently silver, and adorned with gemstones.

== Seraphim ==
The angelic seraphim, found in the Hebrew Bible and later Jewish, Christian, and Islamic traditions, are frequently associated with serpents and are thought to have derived from the concept of uraeus. Multiple-winged uraei amulets are well represented in the land of Israel.

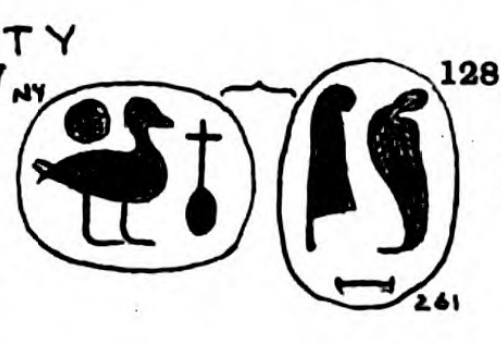
Duck and Hedjet

== See also ==
- Deshret – Red Crown of Lower Egypt
- Hedjet – White Crown of Upper Egypt
- Pschent – Double Crown of Lower & Upper Egypt
- Atef – Hedjet Crown with feathers identified with Osiris
- Khepresh – Blue or War Crown also called Royal Crown
- Khat – head cloth worn by the nobility
- N-red crown (n hieroglyph)
- N-water ripple (n hieroglyph)
- Nekhbet – Woman or vulture wearing an Atef Crown
- Serpent symbolism

== General sources ==
- Alchin, Linda. "The Uraeus Symbol". Egyptian Gods. Siteseen Ltd, n.d. Web.
- Budge, Sir E. A. Wallis. An Egyptian Hieroglyphic Dictionary, in Two Volumes (Dover Publications, Inc, New York), c 1920, Dover Edition, c 1978. Large categorized listings of Hieroglyphs, Vol. 1, pp. xcvii–cxlvii (97–147, 50 pgs.).
- Dunand, Françoise, and Christiane Zivie-Coche. "Cosmonogies, Creation, and Time: Order and Disorder in Creation". Gods and Men in Egypt: 3000 BCE to 395 CE. Ithaca: Cornell U, 2004. 347. Print.
- "Egyptian Symbols: Uraeus". Egyptian Gods and Goddesses. Egyptian-Gods.org, n.d. Web.
- Hagen, Rose-Marie & Rainer Hagen. Egypt; People, Gods, Pharaohs (Barnes and Noble Books, New York), c 2003 (originally: Taschen, GmbH, Koln), c 2003, 1999, p. 202.
- Hardwick, Tom. "The Iconography of the Blue Crown in the New Kingdom". The Journal of Egyptian Archaeology, vol. 89, 2003, pp. 117–141. JSTOR 3822494.
- Johnson, Sally J. (1990). The Cobra Goddess of Ancient Egypt: Predynastic, Early Dynastic, and Old Kingdom Periods. Kegan Paul International. ISBN 0-7103-0212-6.
- Reeves, Nicholas. Ancient Egypt: The Great Discoveries, a Year-by-Year Chronicle (Thames and Hudson Ltd, London), c. 2000. See "1920, The Golden Uraeus of Sesostris II from el-Lahun", p. 157.
