= Shuti hieroglyph (two-feather adornment) =

Egyptian hieroglyph

Shuti

Details
- Country: Ancient Egypt

S9
Shuti
two-feather adornment
in hieroglyphs

The ancient Egyptian Shuti, a two-feather adornment for crowns, is part of a series of hieroglyphs for "crowns"; usage as a hieroglyph is not as common as the actual crown represented in Egyptian art, and artworks.

One popular use of the Shuti, two-feather crown is by the deity Amun, one of his many crowns he is portrayed wearing. The tail feathers in this crown are generally straight, and are assumed to be the tail feathers of a falcon. They can be compared to the ostrich features in the Atef crown of Osiris, or the single ostrich feather that symbolizes Maat.

The shuti hieroglyph and crown may be based upon Maat's ostrich feather, the single curved-top "shu-feather" hieroglyph. It is shown in iconography in both the straight-feather form (when used as a doubled crown). However, the straight feathers of Amun's crown are thought to be falcon feathers.

S9 H6 G43 S9 H6 t Z4 S9 S9
Shuti and
spelling 2, 3, of many
in hieroglyphs

The Budge two-volume dictionary of hieroglyphs records 20 spellings for shuti, from multiple sources. Besides the single hieroglyph, nine spellings use the shuti as a determinative. Most spellings use the Shu-feather, often twice, the feather being the representation, and feather of Maat. Maat as a representative of truth, wisdom, justice, order, etc., in the kingdom, the iconographic headdress implies her role, to the one who wears the shuti two-feather adornments.

== See also ==
- Gardiner's Sign List § S. Crowns, Dress, Staves, etc.
- Gardiner's Sign List
- List of Egyptian hieroglyphs
