= Atef =

Crown of the Egyptian deity Osiris

- Atef crown

Details
- Country: Ancient Egypt, Upper Egypt

Atef (Ancient Egyptian: 𓄿𓏏𓆑𓋚, romanized: ꜣtf) is the specific feathered white crown of the ancient Egyptian deity Osiris. It combines the Hedjet, the white crown of Upper Egypt, with curly ostrich feathers on each side of the crown for the Osiris cult. The feathers are identified as ostrich from their curl or curve at the upper ends, with a slight flare toward the base. They are the same feather as (singly) worn by Maat. They may be compared with the falcon tail feathers in two-feather crowns such as those of Amun, which are more narrow and straight without curve.

The Atef crown identifies Osiris in ancient Egyptian painting. Osiris wears the Atef crown as a symbol of the ruler of the underworld. The tall bulbous white piece in the center of the crown is between two ostrich feathers. The feathers represent truth and justice. The Atef crown is similar, save for the feathers, to the plain white crown (Hedjet) first recorded in the Predynastic Period and worn as a symbol for pharaonic Upper Egypt.

== Gallery ==
drawing of a more complex variant of the Atef

modern drawing of a pharaoh with an Atef crown

modern drawing of Sokar wearing the Atef

modern drawing of Osiris wearing the Atef

modern drawing of Bennu wearing the Atef

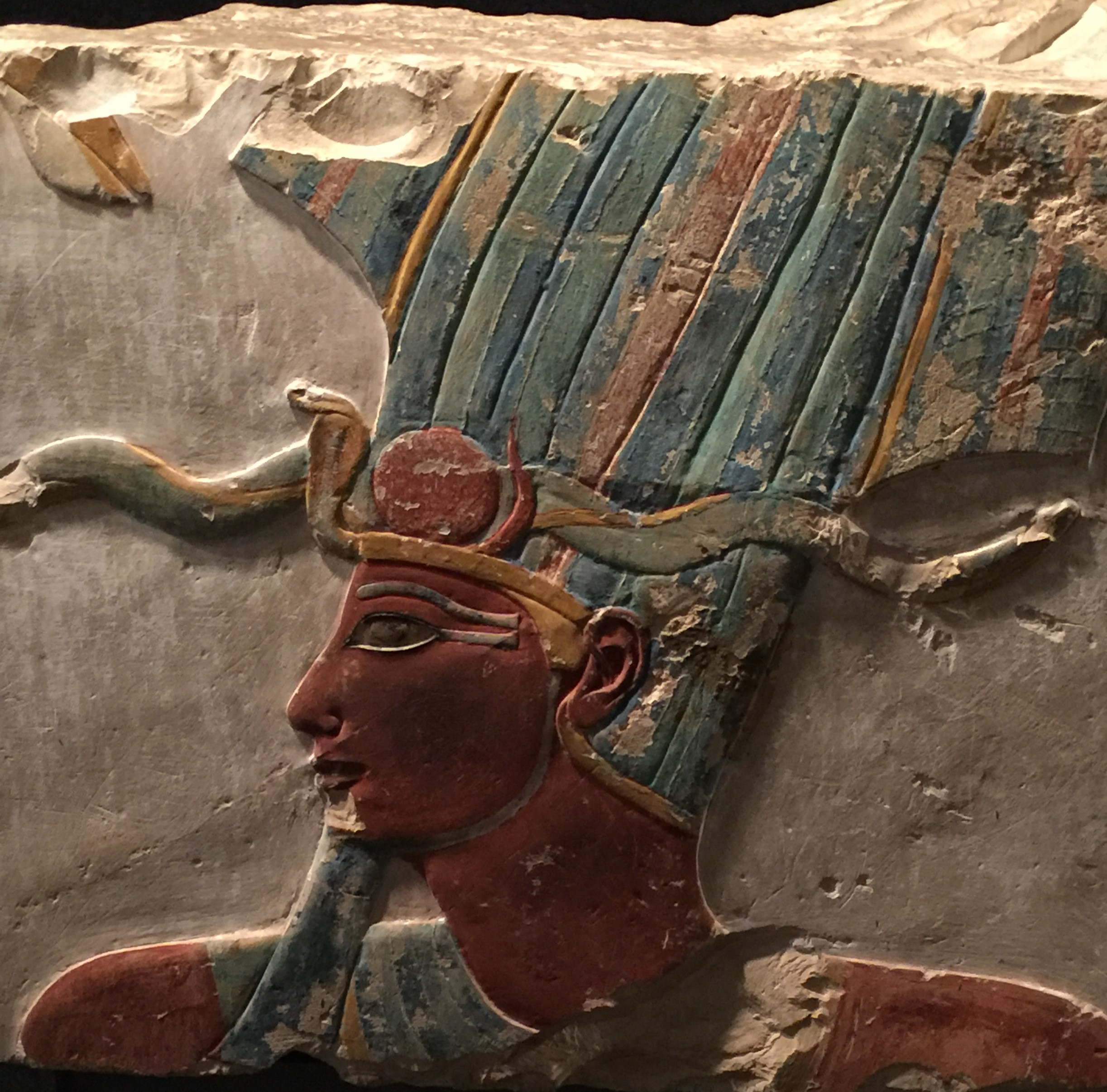
Thutmose III with an Atef

== See also ==
- Crowns of Egypt
- Deshret – Red Crown of Lower Egypt
- Hemhem crown – triple Atef
- Khepresh – Blue or War Crown
- Pschent – Double Crown of Lower & Upper Egypt
- Shuti hieroglyph (two-feather adornment)
