= Deshret =

Red crown of Lower Egypt

- Deshret, the Red Crown of Lower Egypt

Details
- Country: Ancient Egypt, Lower Egypt

D46 N37 D21 X1 S3
Deshret, Red Crown
(crown as
determinative)
in hieroglyphs

Deshret (Ancient Egyptian: 𓂧𓈙𓂋𓏏𓋔, romanized: dšrt, lit. 'Red One') was the Red Crown of Lower Egypt. It was a red bowl shaped with a protruding curlicue. When combined with the Hedjet (White Crown) of Upper Egypt, it forms the Pschent (Double Crown), in ancient Egyptian called the sekhemti.

The Red Crown in Egyptian language hieroglyphs eventually was used as the vertical letter "n". The original "n" hieroglyph from the Predynastic Period and the Old Kingdom was the sign depicting ripples of water.

The word Deshret also referred to the desert Red Land on either side of Kemet (Black Land), the fertile Nile river basin.

== Significance ==
In mythology, the earth deity Geb, original ruler of Egypt, invested Horus with the rule over Lower Egypt. The Egyptian pharaohs, who saw themselves as successors of Horus, wore the deshret to symbolize their authority over Lower Egypt. Other deities wore the deshret too, or were identified with it, such as the protective serpent goddess Wadjet and the creator-goddess of Sais, Neith, who often is shown wearing the Red Crown.

The Red Crown would later be combined with the White Crown of Upper Egypt to form the Double Crown, symbolizing the rule over the whole country, "The Two Lands" as the Egyptians expressed it.

== Records ==
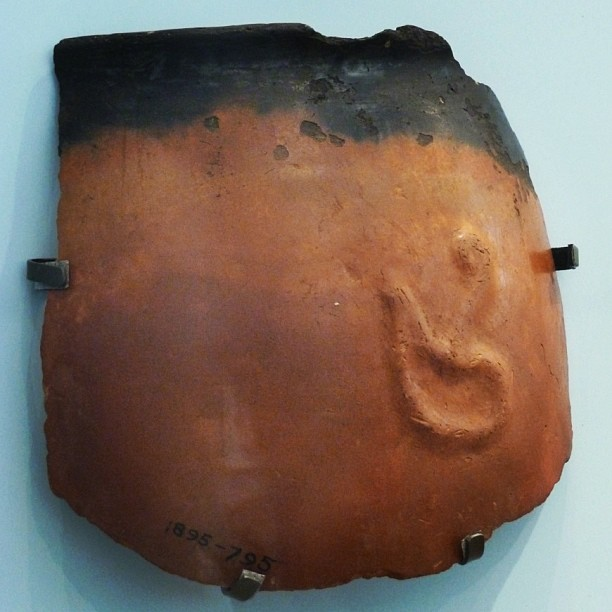
Vase fragment with earliest known depiction of a Red Crown. Naqada IIA, circa 3600 BC, Ashmolean Museum.

No Red Crown has been found. Several ancient representations indicate it was woven like a basket from plant fiber such as grass, straw, flax, palm leaf, or reed.

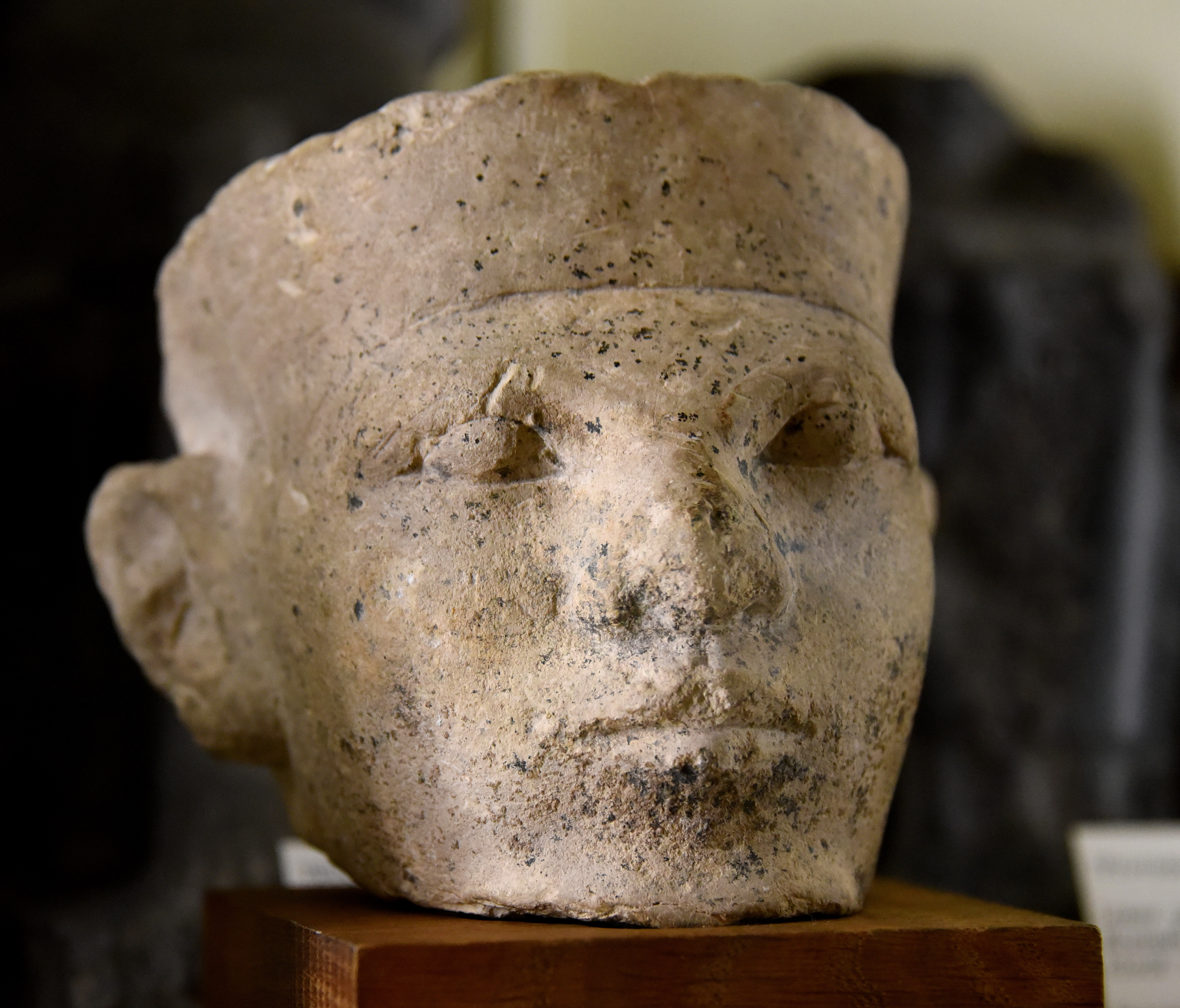
Limestone head of an early Egyptian king, The Petrie Museum. Modern scholars have considered the stone bust to depict an Early Dynastic or Old Kingdom pharaoh, wearing the Deshret crown..

The Red Crown frequently is mentioned in texts and depicted in reliefs and statues. An early example is the depiction of the victorious pharaoh wearing the deshret on the Narmer Palette. A label from the reign of Djer records a royal visit to the shrine of the Deshret which may have been located at Buto in the Nile delta.

The fact that no crown has ever been found buried with any of the pharaohs, even in relatively intact tombs, might suggest that it was passed from one reign to the next, much as in present-day monarchies.

Toby Wilkinson has cited the iconography on rock art in the Eastern Desert region as depicting what he interpreted to be among the earliest representations of the royal crowns and suggested the Red Crown could have originated in the southern Nile Valley.

== Phonogram ==
N
1 Red Crown, Deshret
2 also, vertical
"N"
in hieroglyphs

Deshret, the ancient Egyptian Red Crown, is one of the oldest Egyptian hieroglyphs. As an iconographic element, it is used on the famous palette of Pharaoh Narmer as the "Red Crown of the Delta", the Delta being Lower Egypt.

The first usage of the Red Crown was in iconography as the symbol for Lower Egypt with the Nile Delta, horizontal letter 'n', Gardiner no. 35,

N35

Later it came to be used in the Egyptian language as an alphabetic uniliteral, vertical form for letter "n" as a phoneme or preposition. It became functional in running hieroglyphic texts, where either the horizontal or vertical form preposition satisfied space requirements.

Both the vertical and horizontal forms are prepositional equivalents, with the horizontal letter n, the N-water ripple (n hieroglyph) being more common, as well as more common to form parts of Egyptian language words requiring the phoneme 'n'.

One old use of the red crown hieroglyph is to make the word: 'in'!, (formerly an-(a-with dot)-(the "vertical feather" hieroglyph a, plus the red crown). Egyptian "in" is used at the beginning of a text and translates as: Behold!, or Lo!, and is an emphatic.

The Red Crown is also used as a determinative, most notably in the word for deshret. It is also used in other words or names of gods.

Use in the Rosetta Stone

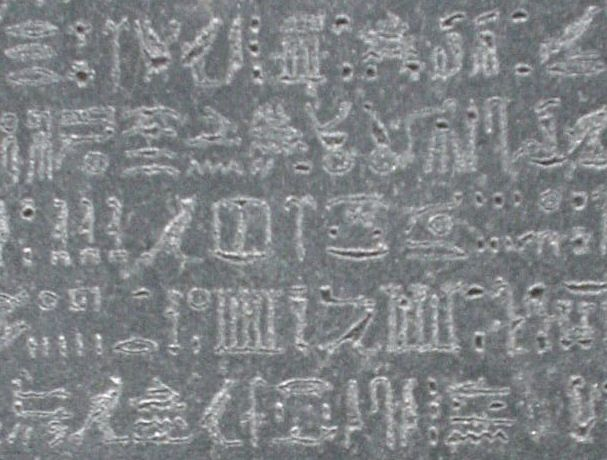
Rosetta Stone usage of Red Crown, not as preposition: part of Pschent (Double Crown), and part of "Taui", the name for Upper and Lower Egypt (used combined with a Crossroads (hieroglyph))

In the 198 BC Rosetta Stone, the 'Red Crown' as hieroglyph has the usage mostly of the vertical form of the preposition "n". In running text, word endings are not always at the end of hieroglyph blocks; when they are at the end, a simple transition to start the next block is a vertical separator, in this case the preposition, vertical n, (thus a space saver).

Since the start of the next hieroglyphic block could also be started with a horizontal "n" at the bottom of the previous block, it should be thought that the vertical "n" is also chosen for a visual effect; in other words, it visually spreads out the running text of words, instead of piling horizontal prepositions in a more tight text. Visually it is also a hieroglyph that takes up more 'space'-(versus a straight-line type for the horizontal water ripple); so it may have a dual purpose of a less compact text, and a better segue-transition to the next words.

The Red Crown hieroglyph is used 35 times in the Rosetta Stone; only 4 times is it used as a non-preposition. It averages once per line usage in the 36 line Decree of Memphis (Ptolemy V)-(Rosetta Stone).

== See also ==
- Crowns of Egypt
- Atef – Hedjet Crown with feathers identified with Osiris
- Khepresh – Blue or War Crown also called Royal Crown
- Pschent - combined White Crown (Hedjet) of Upper Egypt with Red Crown (Deshret) of Lower Egypt

== Gallery ==
Examples of representations
modern drawing of a pharaoh with a red crown

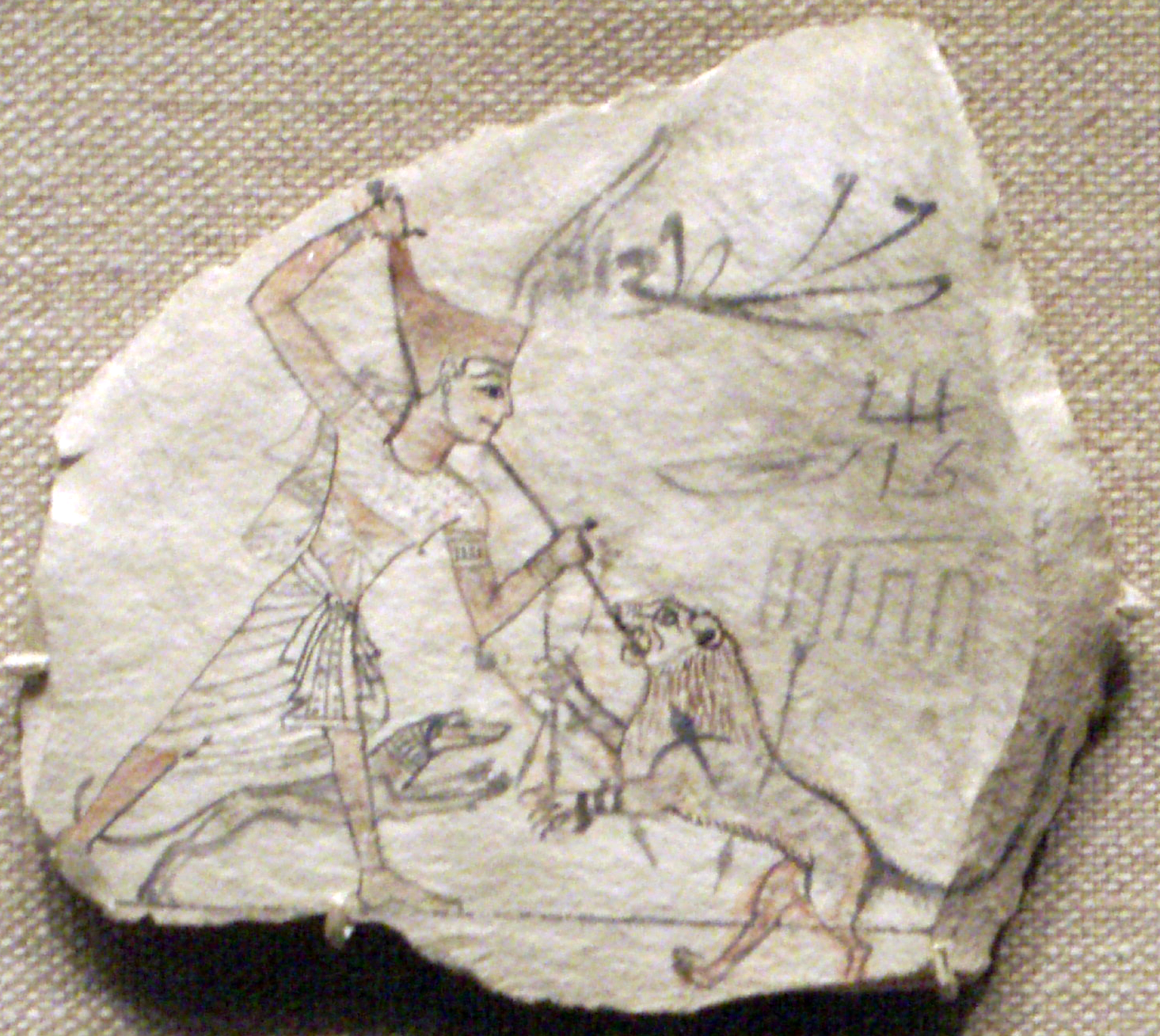
Ramesside Period ostracon, pharaoh wearing Red Crown

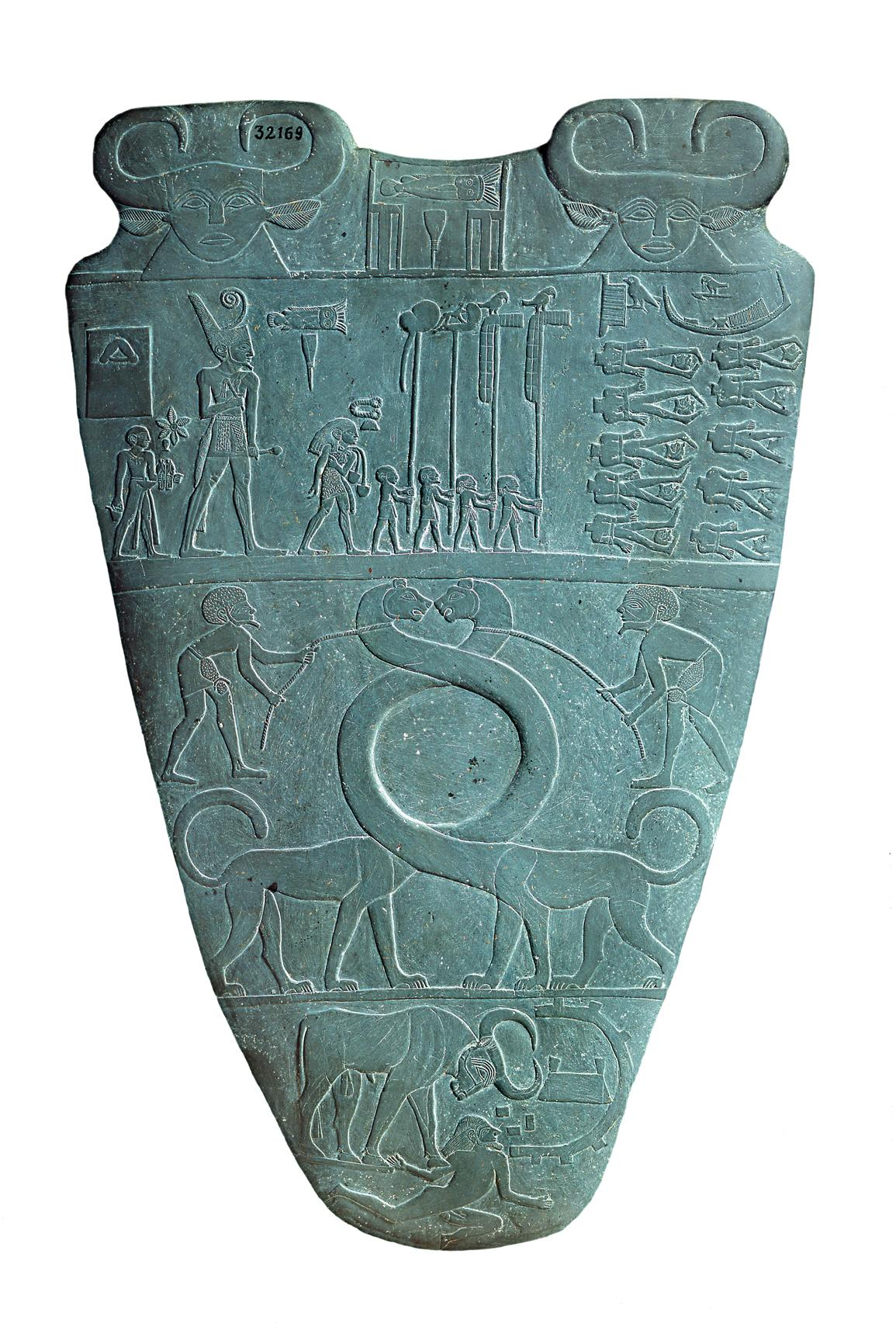
Narmer Palette, front

The vertical letter N, as preposition, or determinative in the Egyptian language

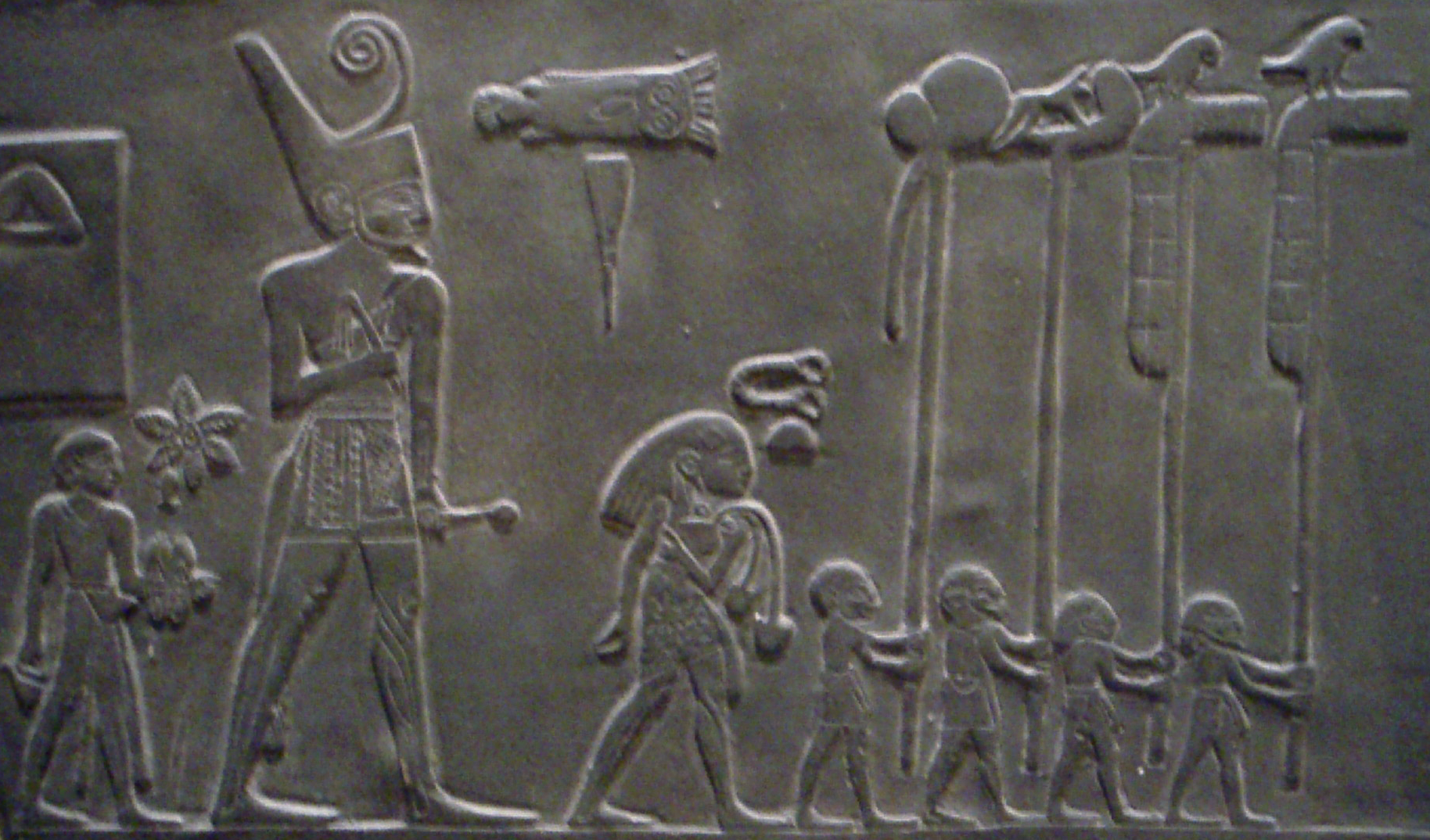
Close-up of Narmer Palette, Pharaoh Narmer with crown

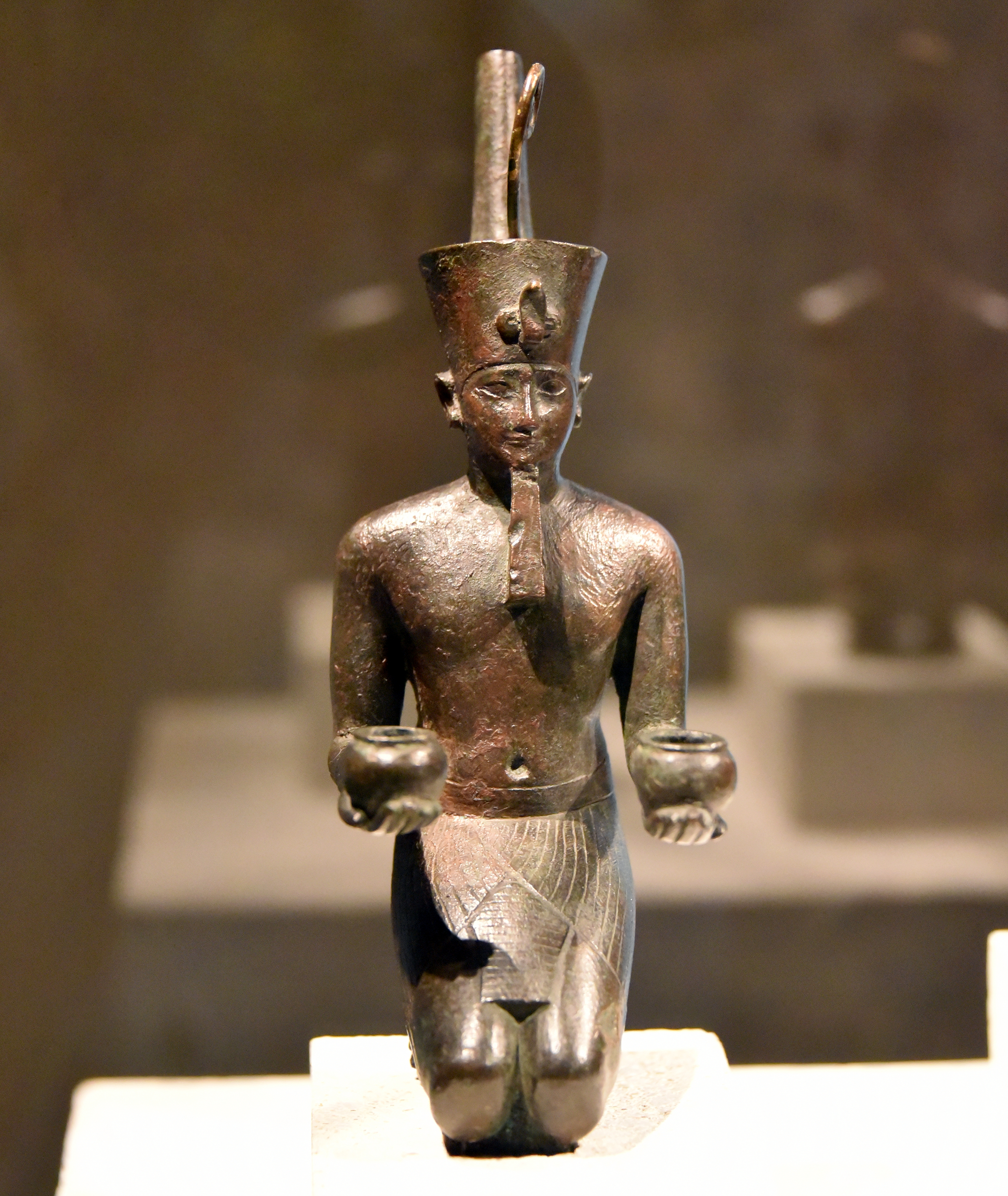
Bronze statuette of a Kushite king wearing the red crown of Lower Egypt; 25th Dynasty, c. 670 BCE, Neues Museum, Berlin

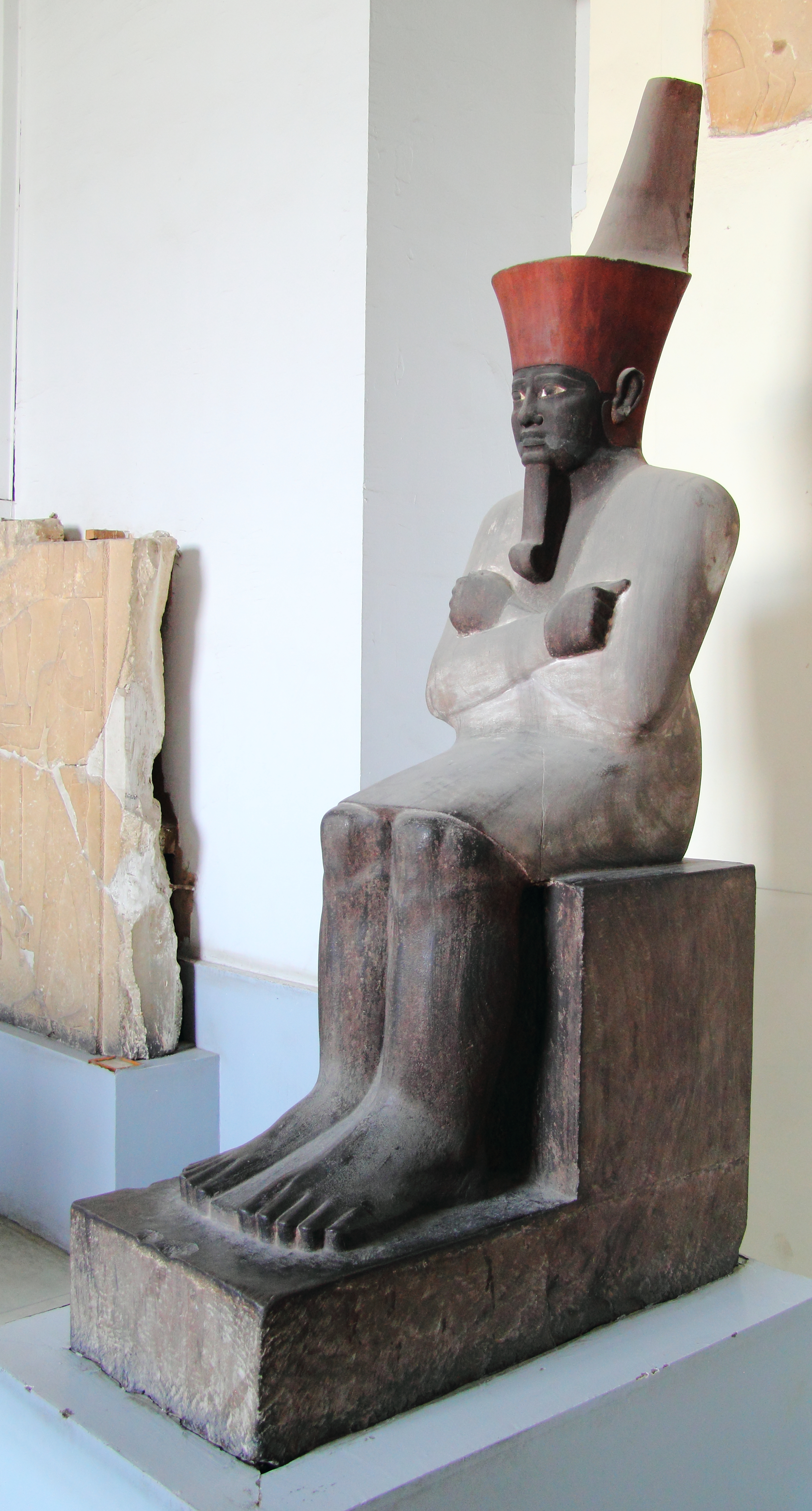
Sandstone statue of Mentuhotep II; 11th Dynasty, c. 2060–2009 BCE, Egyptian Museum, Cairo

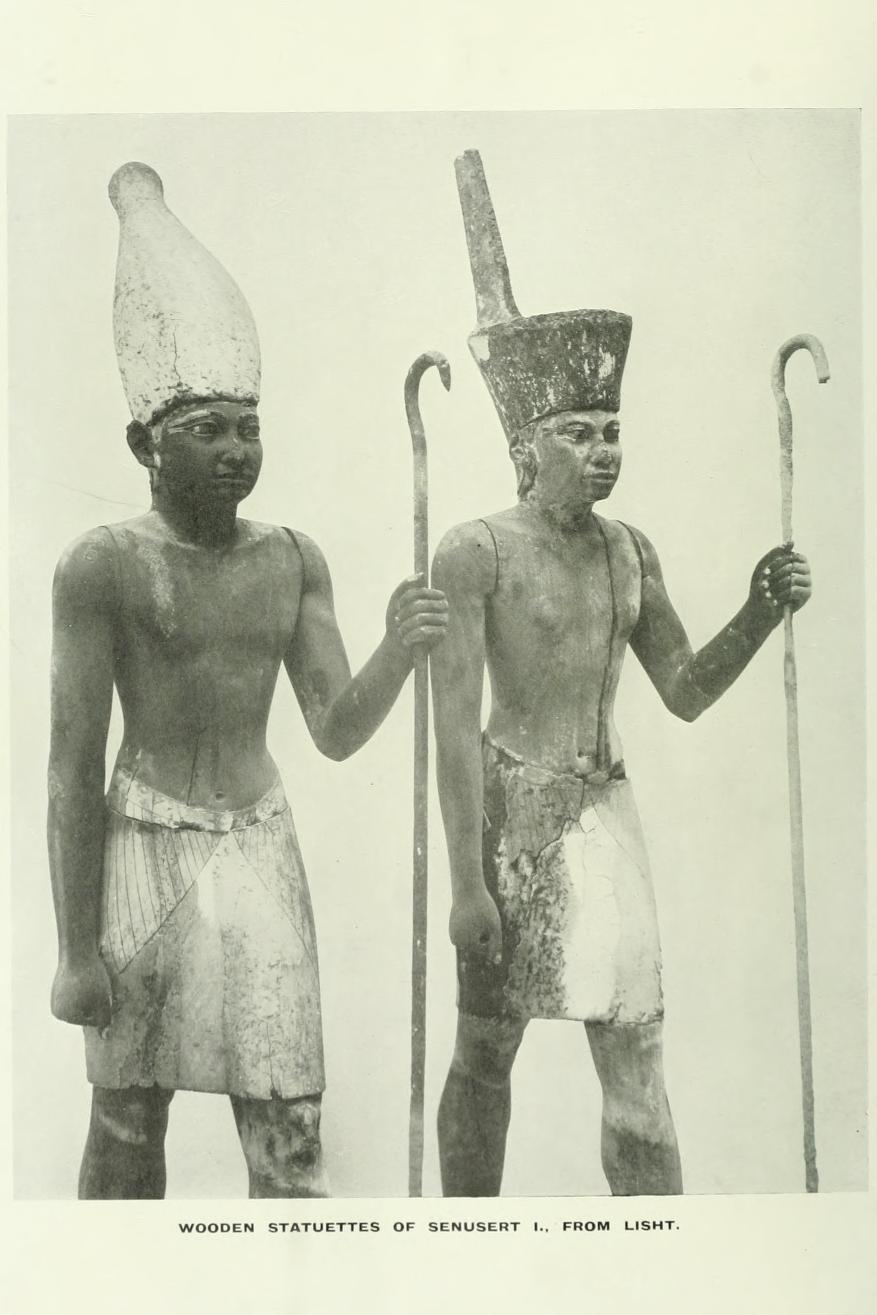
A couple of statuettes which represent a Middle Kingdom pharaoh as King of Upper Egypt (left, with the white crown) and King of Lower Egypt (right, with the red crown); wood, from el-Lisht, 12th dynasty, Middle Kingdom (Egyptian Museum, main floor, room 22, JE44951)

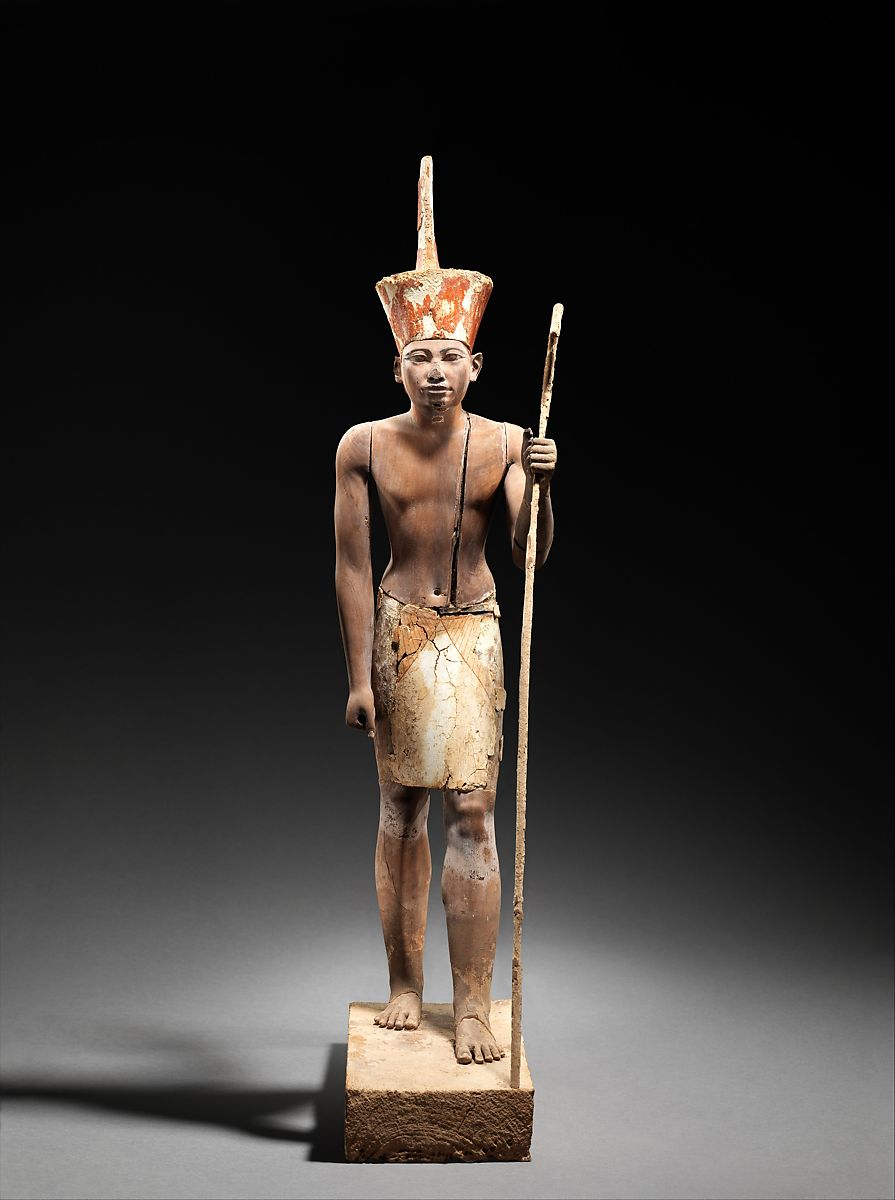
A guardian statue wearing the red crown which reflected the facial features of the reigning king, probably Amenemhat II or Senwosret II, and which functioned as a divine guardian for the imiut; made of cedar wood and plaster c. 1919–1885 BC
Deshret (vertical letter N) in hieroglyphic writing
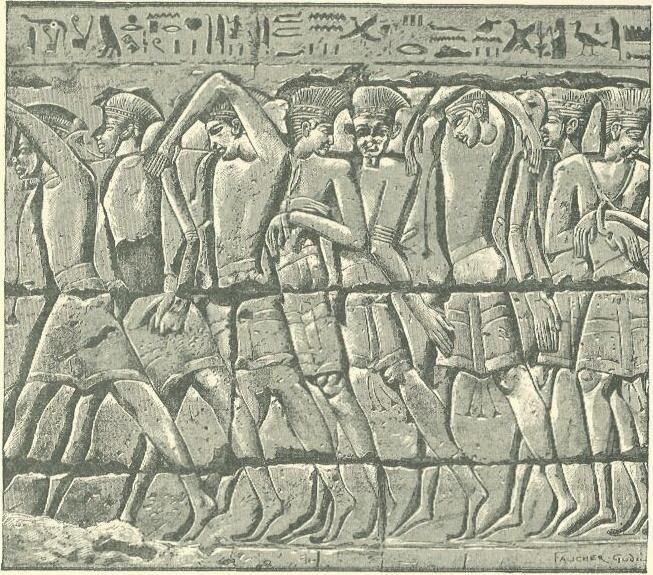
Philistine captives at Medinet Habu

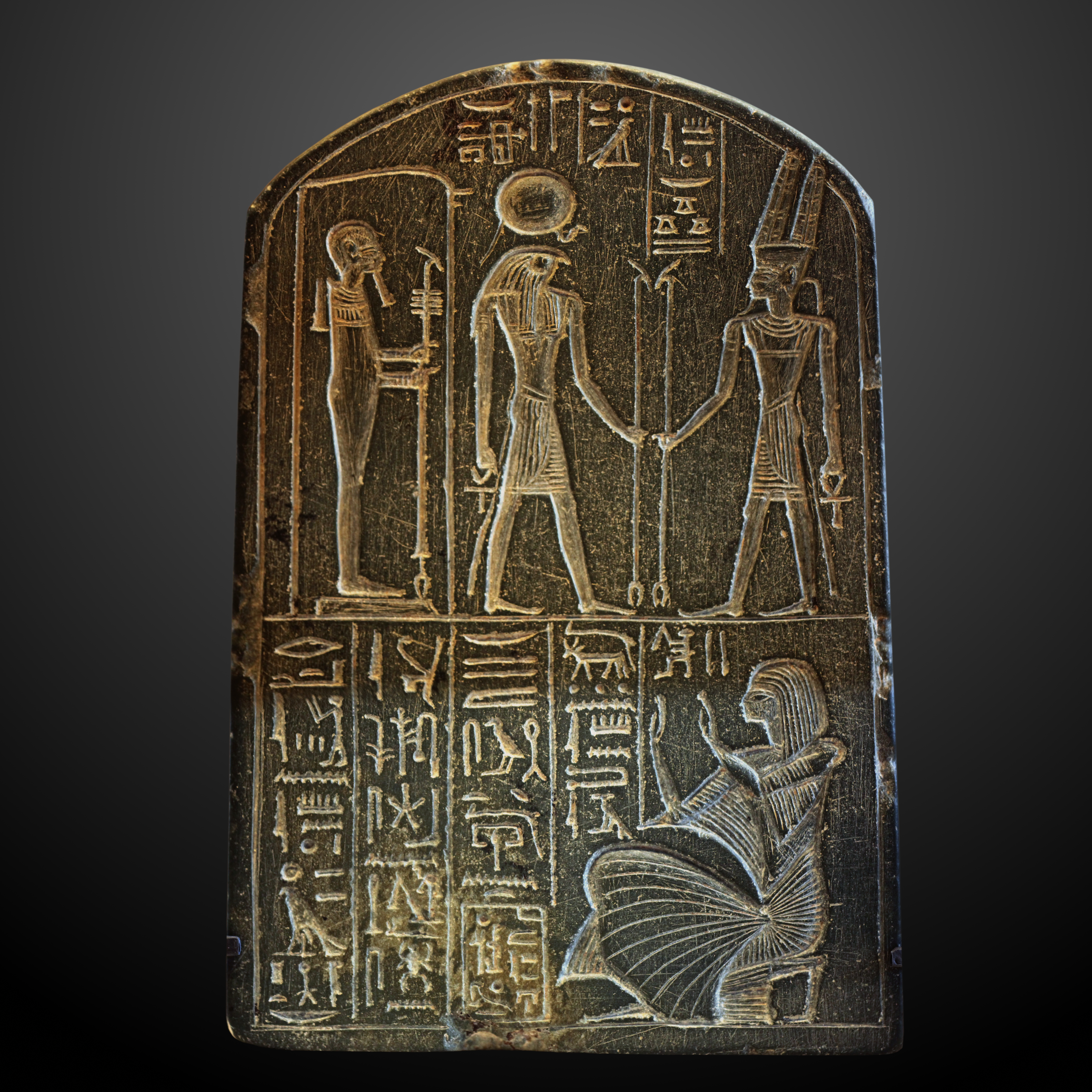
Stele of Tchia at the Louvre

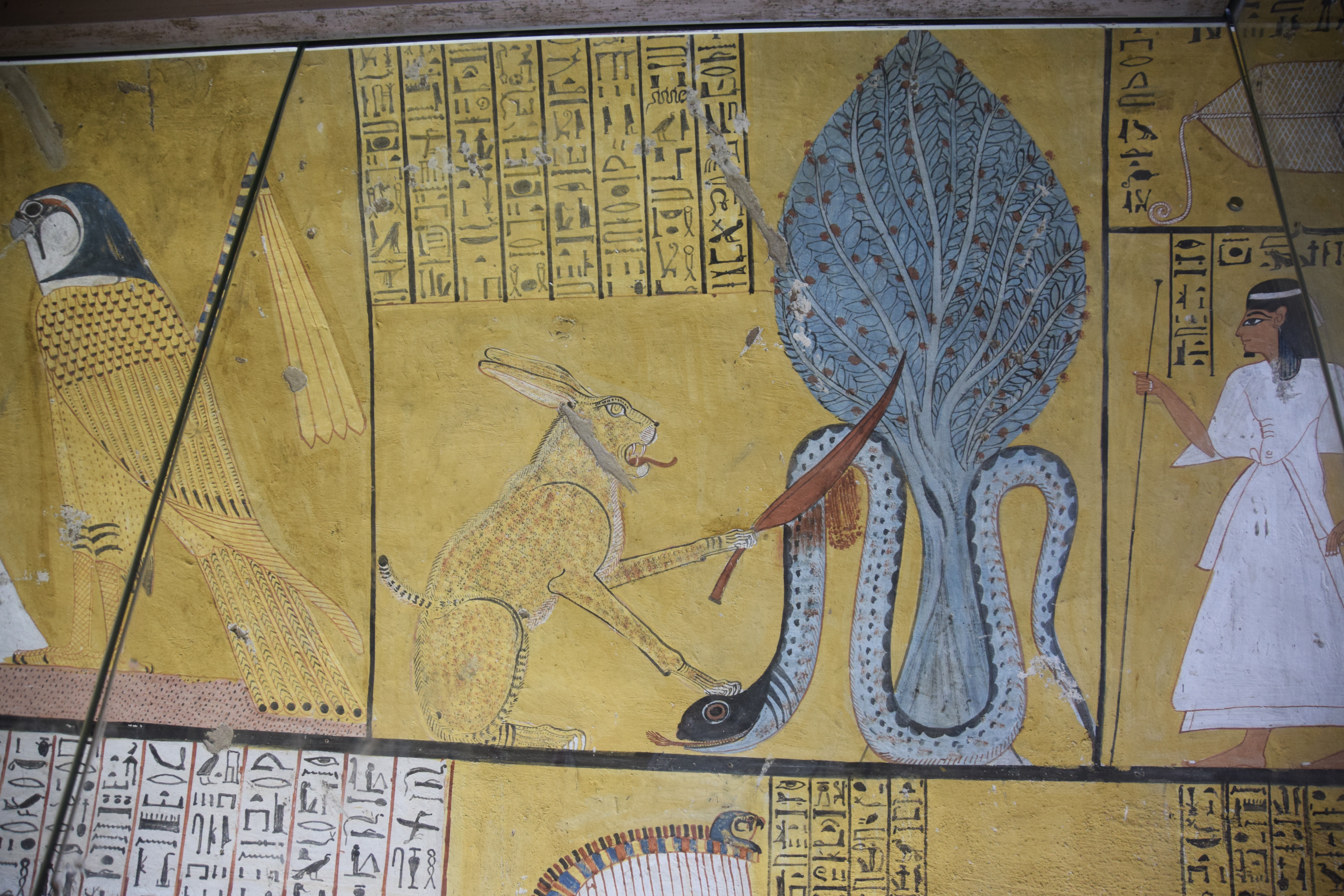
Apep being slain

== Sources ==
- Budge. An Egyptian Hieroglyphic Dictionary, E. A. Wallis Budge, (Dover Publications), c 1978, (c 1920), Dover edition, 1978. (In two volumes) (softcover, ISBN 0-486-23615-3)
- Budge. The Rosetta Stone, E. A. Wallis Budge, (Dover Publications), c 1929, Dover edition(unabridged), 1989. (softcover, ISBN 0-486-26163-8)
- Charron, Alain (1990), "L'époque thinite", L'Égypte des millénaires obscures, Paris, pp. 77–97.
- Stevenson, Alice (2015). The Petrie Museum of Egyptian Archaeology: Characters and Collections. London: UCLPress. ISBN 978-1-910634-04-2.

Open access pdf download.

- Trope, Betsy Teasley; Quirke, Stephen; Lacovara, Peter (2005), Excavating Egypt: great discoveries from the Petrie Museum of Egyptian Archaeology, University College, London, Atlanta: Michael C. Carlos Museum, Emory University.
- Wilkinson, TAH (1999), Early Dynastic Egypt, London; New York: Routledge.
