= Tem (queen) =

Egyptian queen consort

t tm m

Queen consort of Egypt
- King: Mentuhotep II
- Burial: Tomb DBXI.15 at Deir el-Bahari
- Spouse: Mentuhotep II
- Issue: Mentuhotep III

Tem was an ancient Egyptian queen consort of the 11th Dynasty, a wife of King Mentuhotep II and the mother of Mentuhotep III. She was buried in Tomb DBXI.15 in Deir el-Bahari, in her husband's mortuary complex. She outlived her husband and was buried during her son's reign. It is likely that she was of commoner origin, as there is no evidence in her grave that points to a royal origin. She is only named on her sarcophagus and on an offering table. Her titles are "King's beloved wife" (ḥmt-nỉswt mrỉỉ.t=f), King's Mother" (mwt-nỉswt), Mother of the King of Upper and Lower Egypt (mwt-nỉswt-bỉt), and Great of Sceptre (wr.t-ḥt=s).

Her tomb was discovered in 1859, and was fully excavated in 1968 by Dieter Arnold.
