= Mentuhotep III =

Pharaoh of Eleventh Dynasty of Ancient Egypt

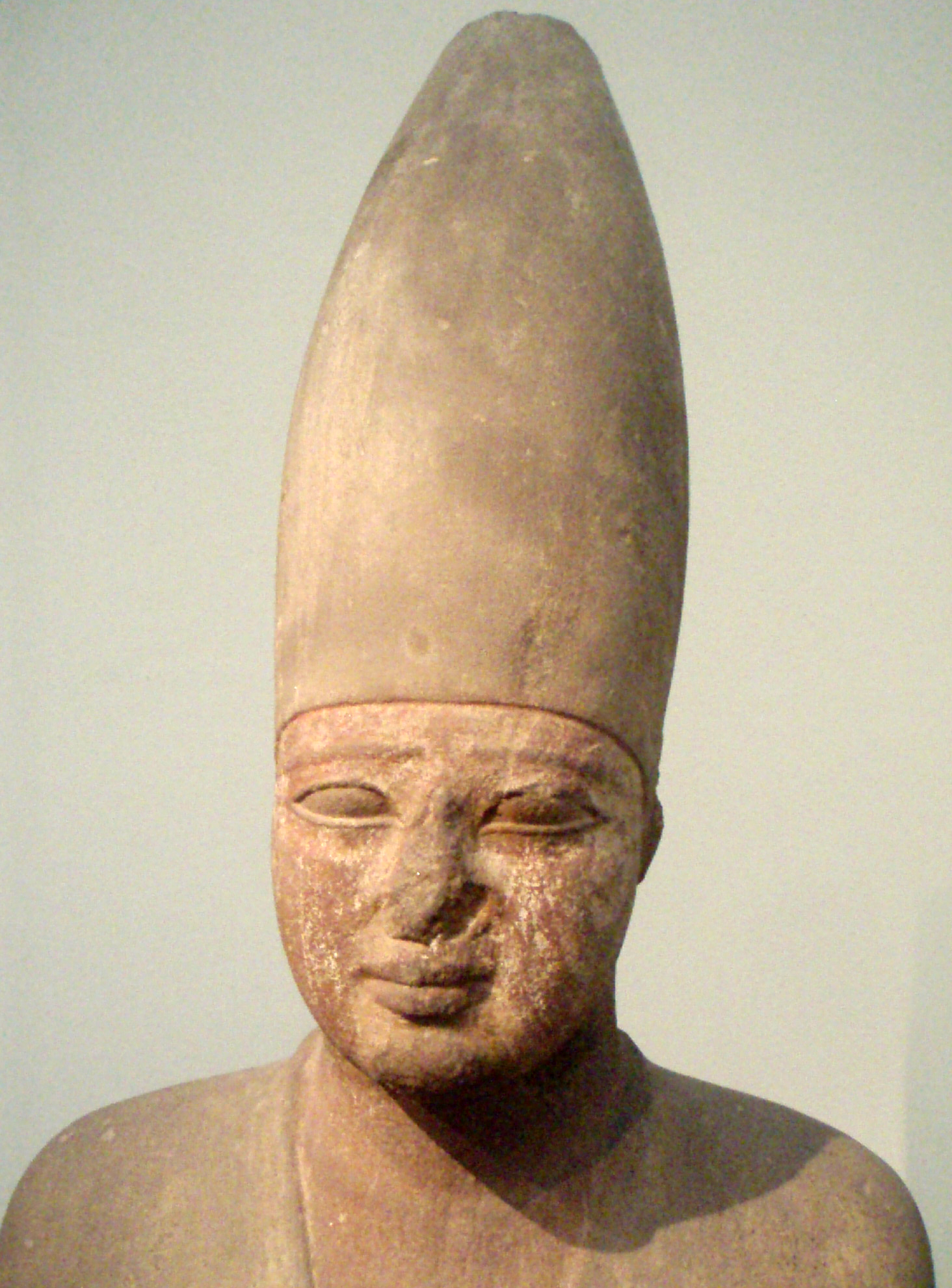
- Osiride statue of king Sankhkare Mentuhotep III, on display at the Museum of Fine Arts, Boston

Pharaoh
- Reign: c. 2009 – c. 1997 BC
- Predecessor: Mentuhotep II
- Successor: Mentuhotep IV
Royal titulary
Horus name
Sankhtawyef
Hr s-ankh-t3-wy-f
Horus, He who invigorates his two lands
G5	S29 S34 N16 N16 I9
Nebty name
Sankhtawyef
s-ankh-t3-wy-f
He who invigorates his two lands
G16	S29 S34 N19 I9
Prenomen
Sankhkare
s-ankh-ka-re
Giving Life to the Soul of Ra

M23 X1 L2 X1	ra s S34 D28
Nomen
Mentuhotep
Mntw-htp
Montu is content

G39 N5	mn n T w Htp t p
- Father: Mentuhotep II
- Mother: Tem
- Died: c. 1997 BC
- Burial: Deir el-Bahari, Luxor, Egypt
- Dynasty: 11th dynasty

Relief with profile and titles of Mentuhotep III

Sankhkare Mentuhotep III (also Montuhotep III; died c. 1997 BC) of the 11th Dynasty was King of Egypt during the Middle Kingdom. He was assigned a reign of 12 years in the Turin Canon. Mentuhotep's reign is known for his expedition to Punt and architectural innovations.

== Reign ==
Mentuhotep III succeeded his father Mentuhotep II to the throne. It is believed that, following his father's long 51 years of reign, Mentuhotep III was relatively old when he acceded to the throne and reigned for 12 years. Despite its short duration, Mentuhotep's reign is known for his expedition to Punt and architectural innovations.

=== Name ===
Mentuhotep III's titulary is very similar to the third and final one of his father. Mentuhotep III is known to have had at least two praenomen: the well known Sankhkare and also

< ra s F35 D28 >
snfr-k3-ra
"He who embellishes the Soul of Re"

=== Expedition to Punt ===
Mentuhotep III sent an expedition to the Land of Punt during the 8th year of his reign, something that had not been done since the Old Kingdom. An inscription in the Wadi Hammamat describes the expedition as being 3,000 men strong and under the command of the steward Henenu. As they left Coptos in direction of the Red Sea (port of Mersa Gawasis?), they dug 12 wells for future expeditions and cleared the region of rebels. They returned from Punt with incense, gum, and perfumes, and quarried the Wadi Hammamat for stones.

=== Monuments ===
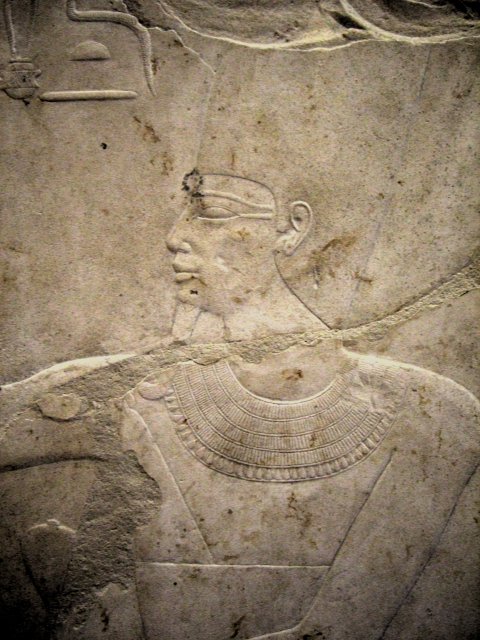
Mentuhotep III on a relief carving from the temple of Monthu in Medamud

Sankhkare Mentuhotep was responsible for several building projects in the 12 years of his reign. He extended the temple of Monthu in Medamud, a monumental decorated doorway bearing his likeness and royal titles now resides in the Louvre.

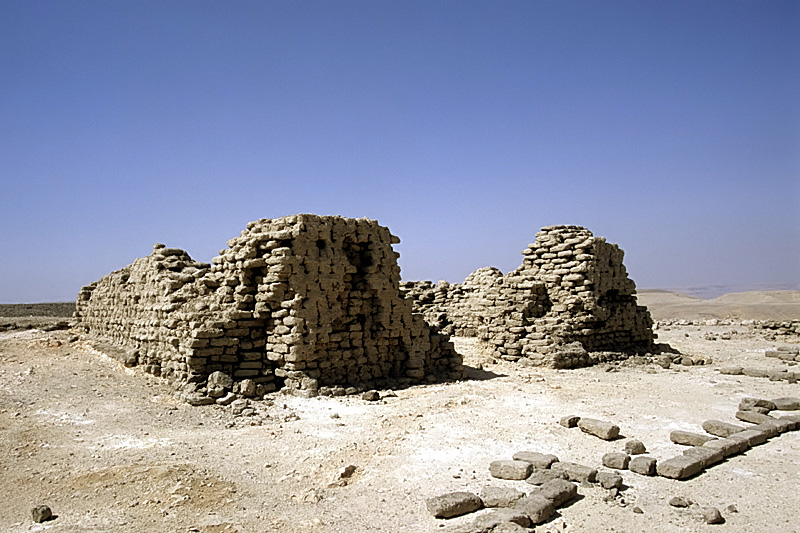
Mentuhotep III's temple at Thoth Hill in Western Thebes

Sankhkare Mentuhotep also had a mudbrick temple erected at Thoth Hill in Western Thebes. The temple was built on the site of an older archaic temple. It was dedicated to the god Montu-Ra. This temple may have been destroyed by an earthquake towards the end of the 11th Dynasty.

It was long presumed that his own tomb and mortuary temple was begun in Deir el-Bahari, but never completed. This temple was located in a separate valley a short distance from his father's mortuary temple. A causeway would have led up to a temple platform. A burial chamber lined with limestone slabs was completed and sealed, but apparently it never contained a burial. The association of the monument with Sankhkare Mentuhotep was circumstantial, based on co-location with the tomb (TT280) of the High Steward Meketre, one of the chief officials of the reign. However, Dorothea Arnold recently provided compelling evidence that the monument is the likely unfinished Theban tomb of Amenemhat I, the funerary monument of Sankhkare Mentuhotep remains unknown. However, the attribution of the monument to Amenemhat I is unproven as well. The owner of the unnamed royal burial place must remain open.

== Family ==
Mentuhotep III was the son and successor of Mentuhotep II. One of the wives of Mentuhotep II, Tem, was given the title Mother of the Dual King and is the mother of Mentuhotep III. Mentuhotep III's family is mostly a mystery. It is currently believed that he fathered his successor Mentuhotep IV with one of his probable harem wives, Imi. This is, however, still debated among Egyptologists. Mentuhotep IV's mother is known to have been Queen Imi. If he was the son of Mentuhotep III, Imi must have been the wife of Mentuhotep III.

== Ancestry ==
Ancestors of Mentuhotep III

Intef II
Intef III
Mentuhotep II
Iah
Mentuhotep III
Tem

== Gallery ==
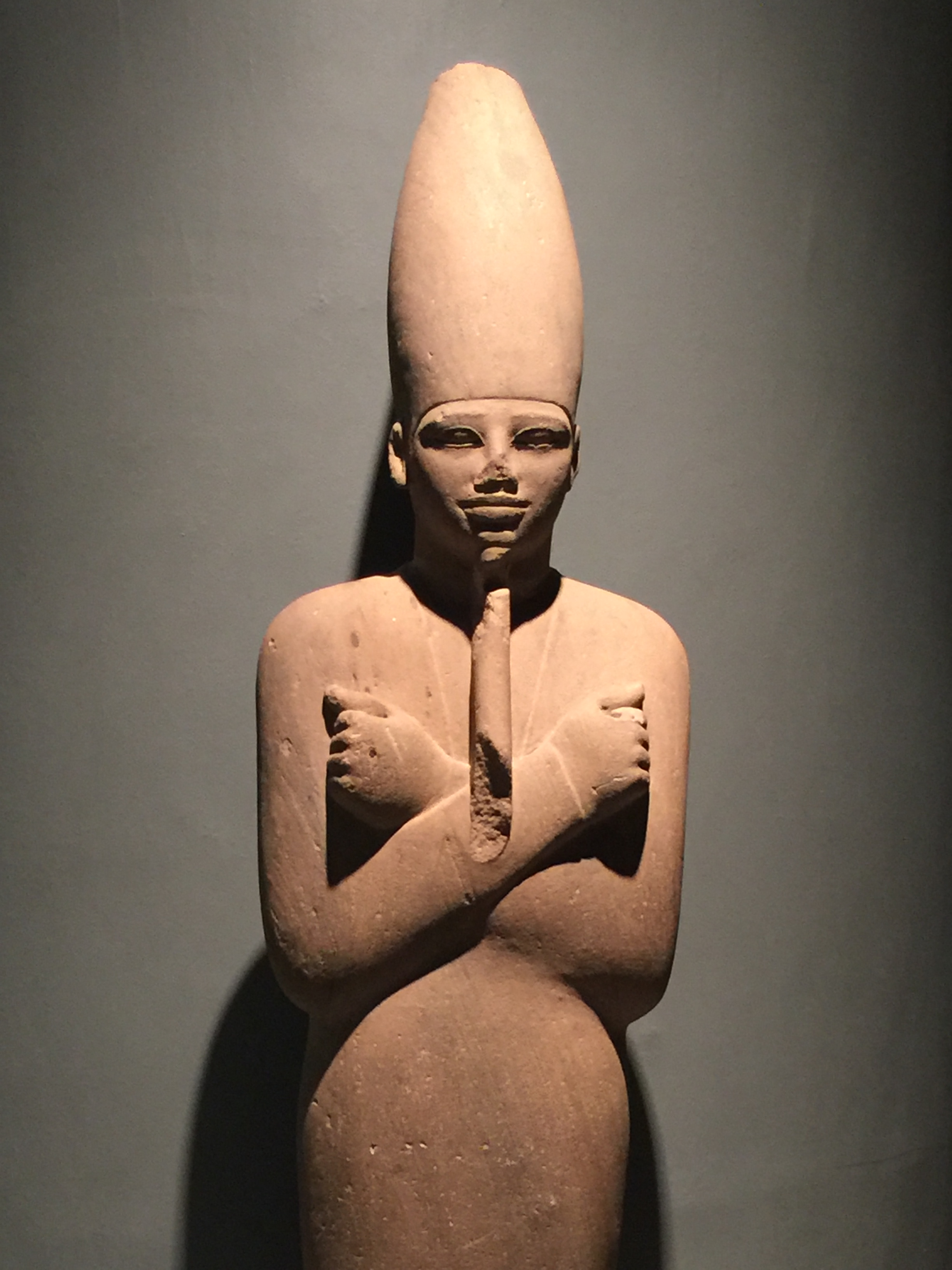
Mentuhotep III, 11th dynasty

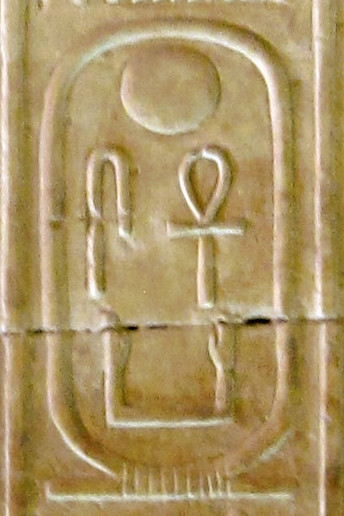
Mentuhotep III's cartouche on the Abydos king list

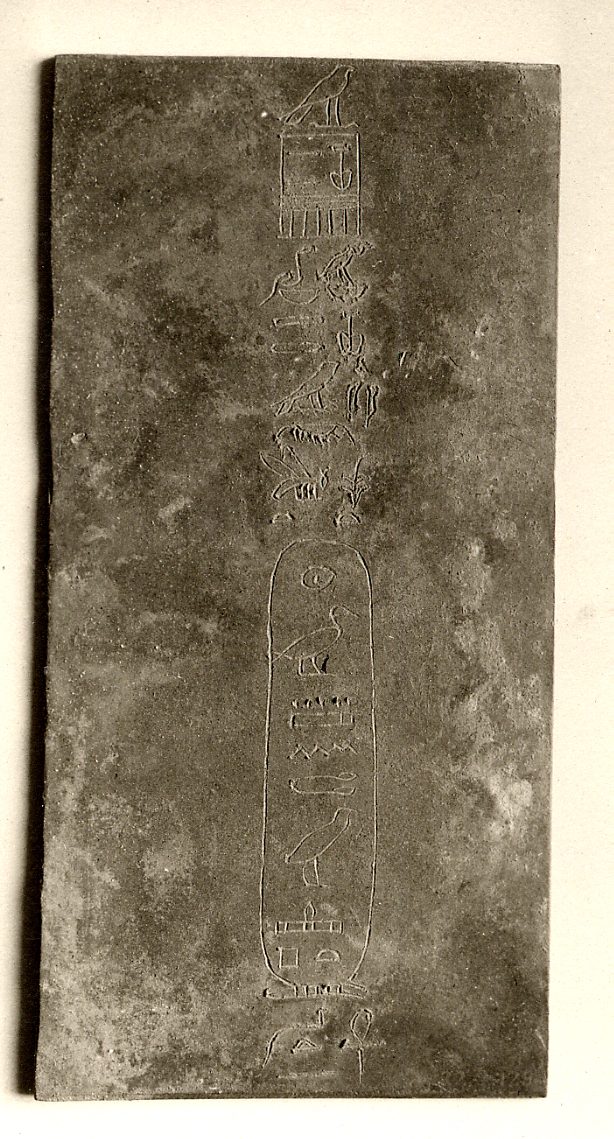
Tablet with names and titles of Mentuhotep III

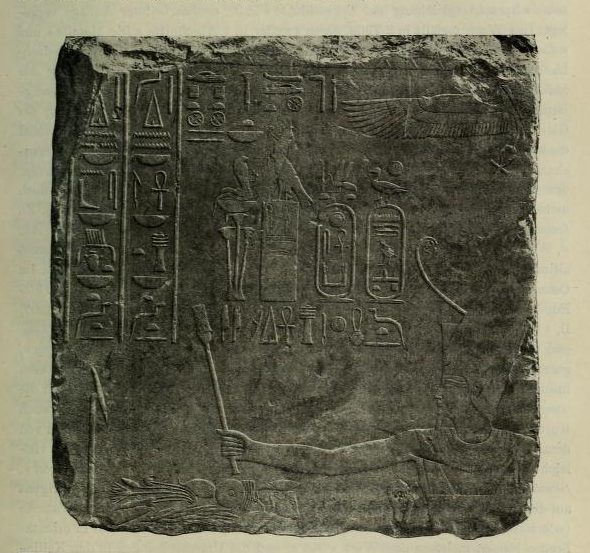
Limestone block with relief of pharaoh Sankhkare Mentuhotep III of the 11th Dynasty, along with his royal titulary, found in 1908 at Elephantine

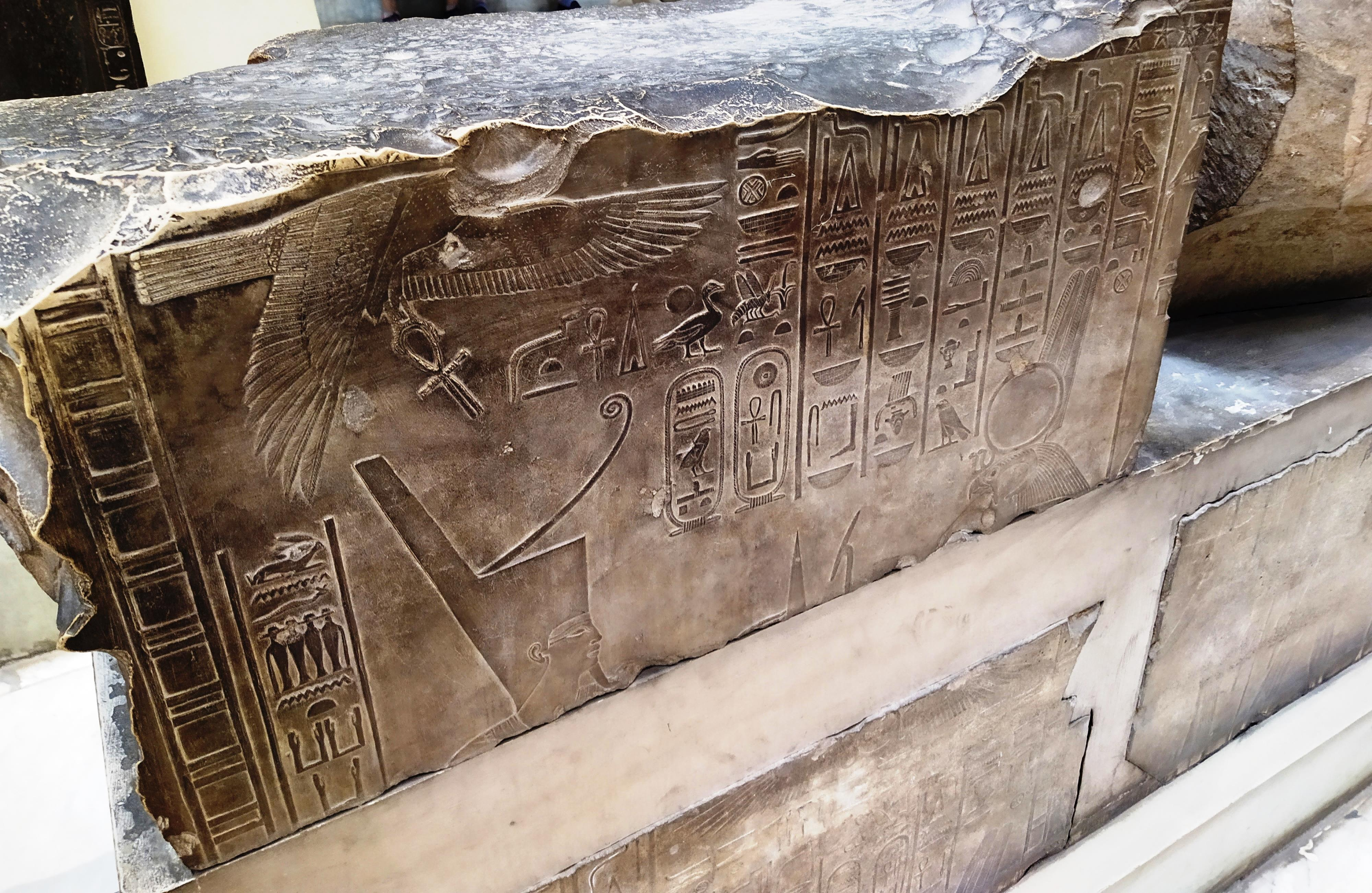
An ancient sarcophagus with relief of pharaoh Sankhkare Mentuhotep III in the Egyptian Museum, Cairo

Preceded by Mentuhotep II	King of Egypt c. 2009 – c. 1997 BC	Succeeded by Mentuhotep IV
