= Thoth Hill =

Archaeological site in Egypt

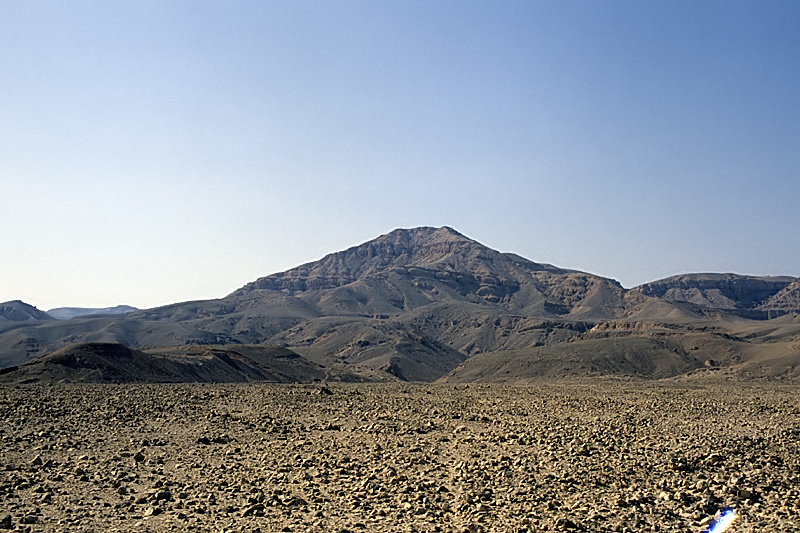
- View of Thoth Hill

- Location within Egypt
- 25°45′57″N 32°36′32″E
- Type: Temple
- Location: Luxor, North of the Valley of the Kings
- Region: Upper Egypt
- Part of: Luxor

History
- Built: Predynastic Egypt

Site notes
- Public access: No

Thoth Hill is an archaeological site first dated to the predynastic period located on the West Bank of Thebes approximately 3 kilometers north of the Valley of the Kings. A predynastic temple was built over by a mud-brick temple from the 11th Dynasty that is still visible today. The temple was dedicated to the god Horus. The site is the oldest known temple in Thebes.

== Background ==
The temple was discovered in 1904 by the German Egyptologist Georg Schweinfurth. Further excavations were carried out in 1909 by Flinders Petrie where he found inscribed limestone fragments from a doorframe bearing the names of Mentuhotep III which are now in the Rijksmuseum van Oudheden in Leiden. Petrie was the first to recognize that the stone remains of an earlier temple lie beneath the temple. Schweinfurth and Petrie found fragments of baboon statues of the god Thoth, which led to the mountain's modern name. Thoth may also have been worshipped here.

Between 1995 and 1998, Hungarian excavations under Győző Vörös and Rezső Pudleiner took place. The excavations completely uncovered the later Nile mud-brick temple, examined the stone remains of the older temple beneath the Nile mud floor, and suggested a date before the 11th Dynasty. This stone temple would thus be the oldest known Theban temple. The older stone temple is comparable in plan and size to the later temple. However, the first temple had only one sanctuary. An alabaster vessel, sacrificial bowls, terracotta animal figurines, and the remains of slaughtered animals were found in the foundation pits at the four corners of the temple. The site and its temple were the starting point of a desert road to Middle Egypt. Approximately 130 meters west, another building was discovered that probably served as accommodation for travelers and pilgrims.

== Gallery ==
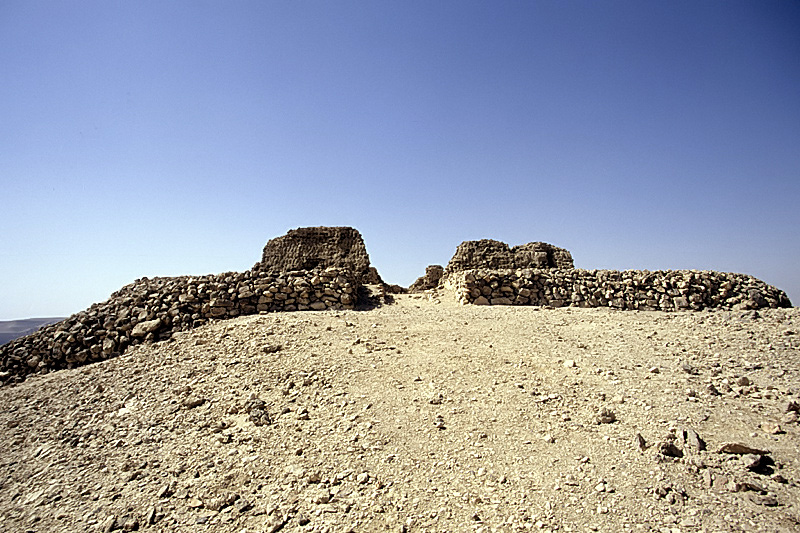
Eastern Entrance to the temple

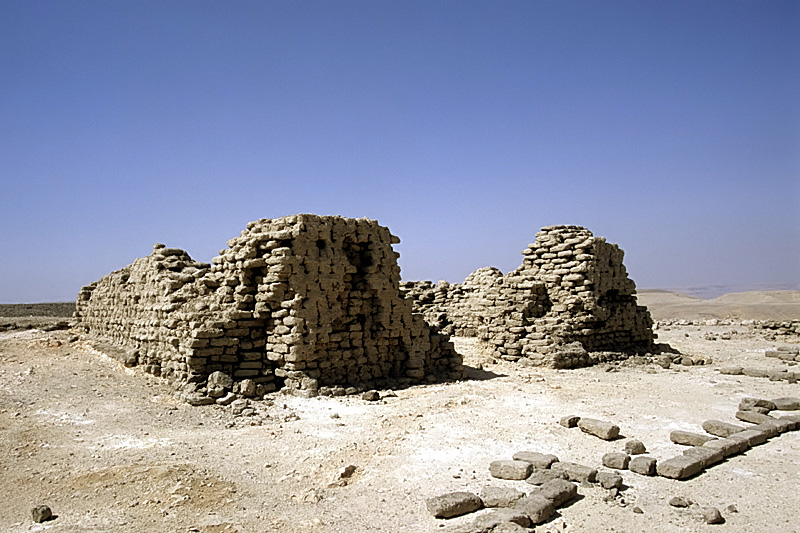
Horus temple dated to Mentuhotep III

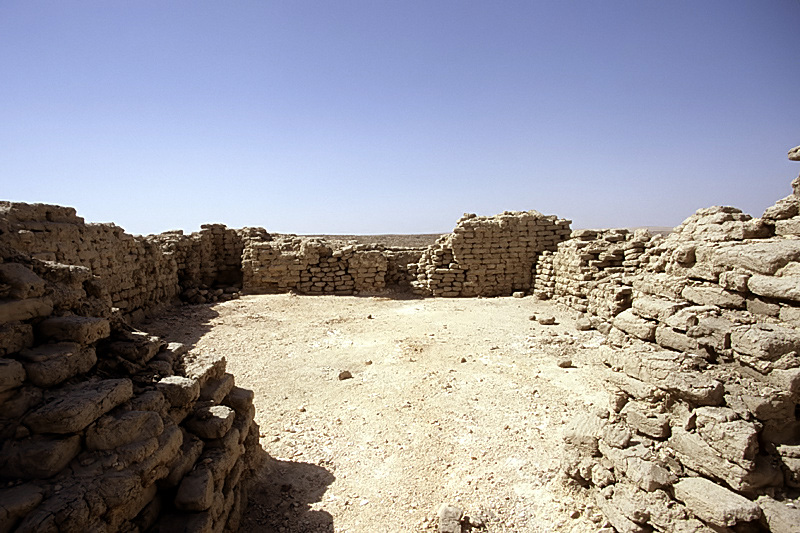
Inside the Horus temple
