= Mentuhotep II =

Egyptian pharaoh of the 11th Dynasty

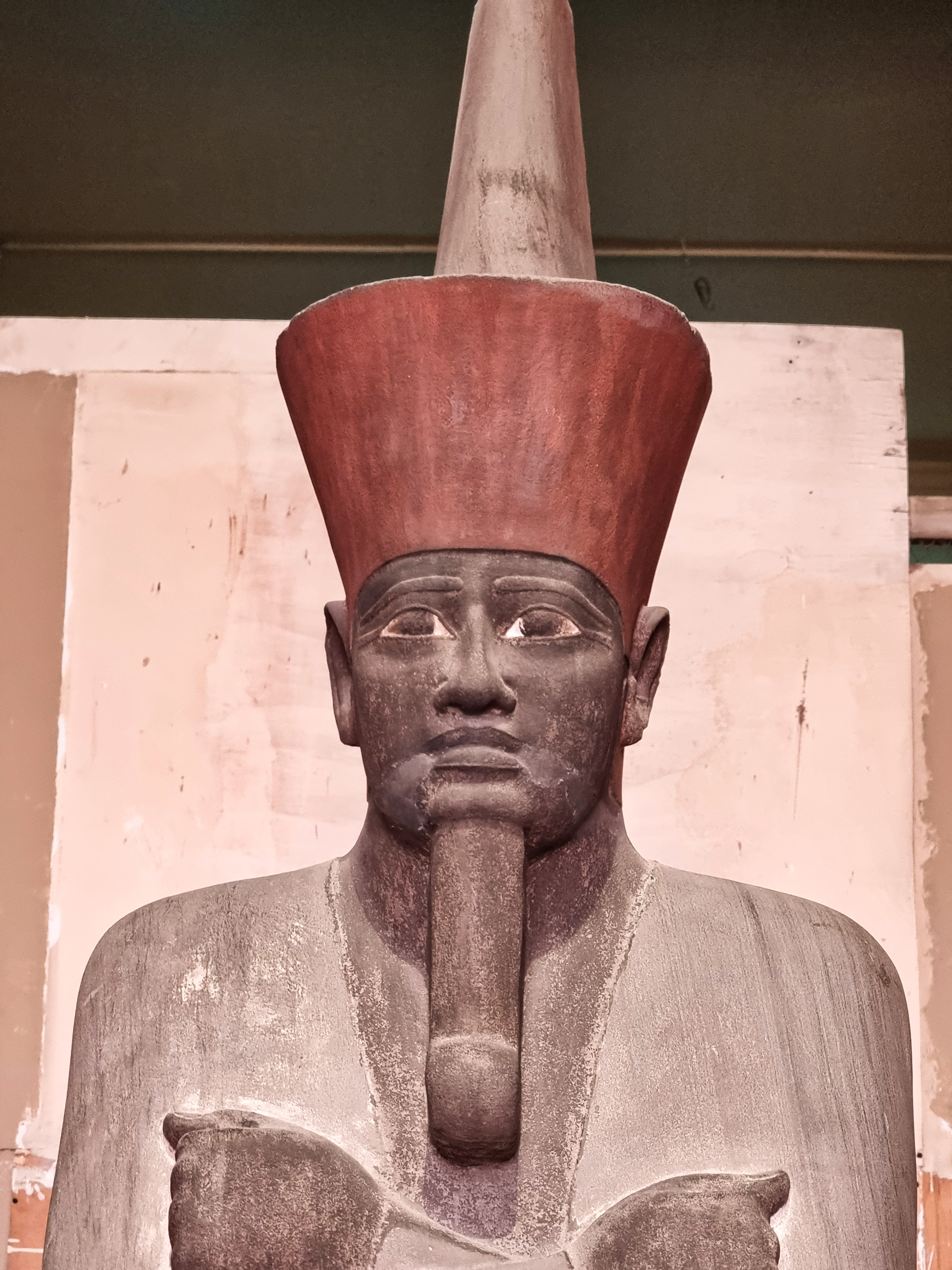
- Painted osiride sandstone seated Ka statue of king Nebhepetre Mentuhotep II, on display at the Egyptian Museum, Cairo

Pharaoh
- Reign: South Egypt: c. 2060 - c. 2040 BC; Egypt: c. 2040 - c. 2009 BC
- Predecessor: South Egypt: Intef III; North Egypt: Merikare
- Successor: Mentuhotep III
Royal titulary
Horus name
- Seankhibtawy
  S.ˁnḫ-ib-tȝwy
  Horus, He who invigorates the heart of the two lands
  S29 S34 F34 N16 N16
- Netjerihedjet
  Nṯrj-ḥḏtꜥ
  Horus, The divine one of the white crownR8 S2
- Sematawy
  Sm3-t3.w(j)ꜥ
  Horus, He who unifies the two landsF36 N16 N16
Nebty name
Sematawy
Sm3-t3.w(j)
He who unifies the two lands
G16	F36 N16 N16
Golden Horus
Biknebu Qashuti
Bjk-nbw-q3-šwtj
The Golden Falcon, lofty in plumes
N29 G5 S12 S9
Prenomen
Nebhepetre
Nb-ḥ3pt-Rˁ
The Lord of the rudder is Ra
L2 t M23 t < ra nb P8 >
Abydos King List
Nebhepetre
Nb-ḥ3pt-Rˁ
The Lord of the rudder is Ra
< N5 V30 P8 >
Karnak king list
Nebhepetre
Nb-ḥ3pt-Rˁ
The Lord of the rudder is Ra
< N5 V30 P8 >
Turin King List
Nebhepetre
Nb-ḥ3pt-Rˁ
The Lord of the rudder is Ra
< N5 V30 P8 G7 HASH >
Nomen
Mentuhotep
Mn-ṯw-ḥtp
Montu is content
G39 N5 < mn n T w Htp t p >
- Consorts: Tem, Neferu II, Kawit, Henhenet, Ashayet, Kemsit, and Sadeh
- Children: Mentuhotep III
- Father: Intef III
- Mother: Iah
- Died: c. 2009 BC
- Burial: Deir el-Bahari, Luxor, Egypt
- Dynasty: 11th Dynasty

Mentuhotep II (Ancient Egyptian: Mn-ṯw-ḥtp, meaning "Mentu is satisfied"), also known under his prenomen Nebhepetre (Ancient Egyptian: Nb-ḥpt-Rˁ, meaning "The Lord of the rudder is Ra"; died c. 2009 BC), was an ancient Egyptian King, the sixth ruler of the 11th Dynasty. He is credited with reuniting Egypt, thus ending the turbulent First Intermediate Period and becoming the first pharaoh of the Middle Kingdom. He reigned for 51 years, according to the Turin King List. Mentuhotep II succeeded his father Intef III on the throne and was in turn succeeded by his son Mentuhotep III.

Mentuhotep II ascended Egypt's throne in the Upper Egyptian city of Thebes during the First Intermediate Period. Egypt was not unified during this time, and the 10th Dynasty, rival to Mentuhotep's 11th, ruled Lower Egypt from Herakleopolis. After the Herakleopolitan kings desecrated the sacred ancient royal necropolis of Abydos in Upper Egypt in the fourteenth year of Mentuhotep's reign, Pharaoh Mentuhotep II dispatched his armies north to conquer Lower Egypt. Continuing his father Intef III's conquests, Mentuhotep succeeded in unifying his country, probably shortly before his 39th year on the throne. Following and in recognition of the unification, in regnal year 39, he changed his titulary to Sematawy (Ancient Egyptian: Smȝ-tȝ.w(j), meaning "He who unifies the two lands").

Following the unification, Mentuhotep II reformed Egypt's government. To reverse the decentralization of power, which contributed to the collapse of the Old Kingdom and marked the First Intermediate Period, he centralized the state in Thebes by stripping from nomarchs some of their power. Mentuhotep II also created new governmental posts whose occupants were Theban men loyal to him, giving the pharaoh more control over his country. Officials from the capital travelled the country regularly to control regional leaders.

Mentuhotep II was buried at the Theban necropolis of Deir el-Bahari. His mortuary temple was one of Mentuhotep II's most ambitious building-projects, and included several architectural and religious innovations. For example, it included terraces and covered walkways around the central structure, and it was the first mortuary temple that identified the pharaoh with the god Osiris. His temple inspired several later temples, such as those of Hatshepsut and Thutmose III of the Eighteenth Dynasty. Some depictions of Mentuhotep II seem to indicate that he suffered from elephantiasis, resulting in swollen legs.

== Family ==
Mentuhotep II was the son of Intef III and Intef III's wife Iah who may also have been his sister. This lineage is demonstrated by the stele of Henenu (Cairo 36346), an official who served under Intef II, Intef III and his son, which the stele identifies as Horus s-ankh-[ib-t3wy], Mentuhotep II's first Horus name. As for Iah, she bore the title of mwt-nswt, "King's mother". The parentage of Mentuhotep II is also indirectly confirmed by a relief at Shatt er-Rigal. Some scholars have suggested that Mentuhotep II was of Nubian origin. Specifically, Wildung and Lobban have argued that Egyptian iconography represented Mentuhotep II with pronounced Nubian facial features. Crawford noted that the rulers of the 11th dynasty were based in the Theban or southern region of Upper Egypt and had close relations with Nubia.

=== Consorts ===
Mentuhotep II had many wives who were buried with him in or close to his mortuary temple.

- Tem (tm) (died c. 2000 BC): might have been Mentuhotep II's chief wife as she bore the titles of ḥmt-nswt "King's wife", ḥmt-nswt mryt.f "King's wife, his beloved" and wrt-ḥts-nbwj "Great one of the hetes-sceptre of the two Lords". She gave Mentuhotep II two children, one of whom was Mentuhotep III since Tem was also called mwt-nswt, ""King's mother" and mwt-nswt-bjtj, "Dual king's mother". Apparently she died after her husband and was buried by her son in Mentuhotep's temple. Her tomb was discovered in 1859 by Lord Dufferin and fully excavated in 1968 by Dieter Arnold.
- Neferu II ("The beautiful"): was called "King's wife" and ḥmt-nswt-mryt.f, "King's wife, his beloved". She might have been Mentuhotep II's sister since she also bore the titles of sȝt-nswt-šmswt-nt-ẖt.f, "Eldest king daughter of his body", jrjt-pˁt, "hereditary princess" and ḥmwt-nbwt, "mistress of all women". She was buried in the tomb TT319 of Deir el-Bahri.

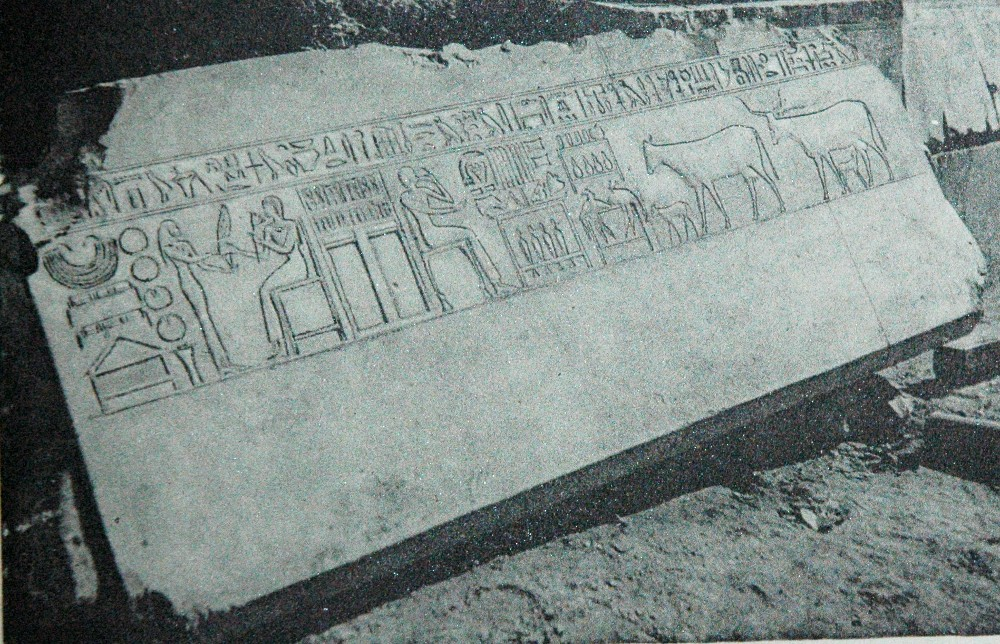
Sarcophagus of Kawit, photograph by E. Naville, 1907

- Kawit (kȝwj.t): was one of Mentuhotep II's secondary wives. She bore the titles of ḥmt-nswt mryt.f "King's wife, his beloved" and ẖkrt-nswt, "King's embellishment". She was a "Priestess of the goddess Hathor". It has been suggested that she was Nubian. She was buried under the terrace of Mentuhotep II's mortuary temple where E. Naville uncovered her sarcophagus in 1907.
- Henhenet, Ashayet, Kemsit, and Sadeh were all Mentuhotep II's secondary wives. They bore the title of ḥmt-nswt mryt.f "King's wife, his beloved" and ẖkrt-nswt-wˁtit "Unique embellishment of the King". They were priestesses of Hathor and each of them was buried in a single pit dug under the terrace of Mentuhotep II's temple. Note that an alternative theory holds that Henhenet was one of Intef III's secondary wives, possibly the mother of Neferu II. Henhenet might have died in childbirth. On the interior decoration of Ashayet's coffin she included her household with images that included racial markers in the coloring of her black skin and yellow skin for her three female scribes. Kemsit is also shown in a painting in her tomb with black skin. The artists apparently was commissioned to show the Nubian origin of these queens.

=== Children with Tem ===
- Mentuhotep III (died c. 1997 BC)

=== Possible children ===
- Mayet: a five-year-old girl buried with Mentuhotep II's secondary wives. She is most likely one of his daughters.

== Reign ==
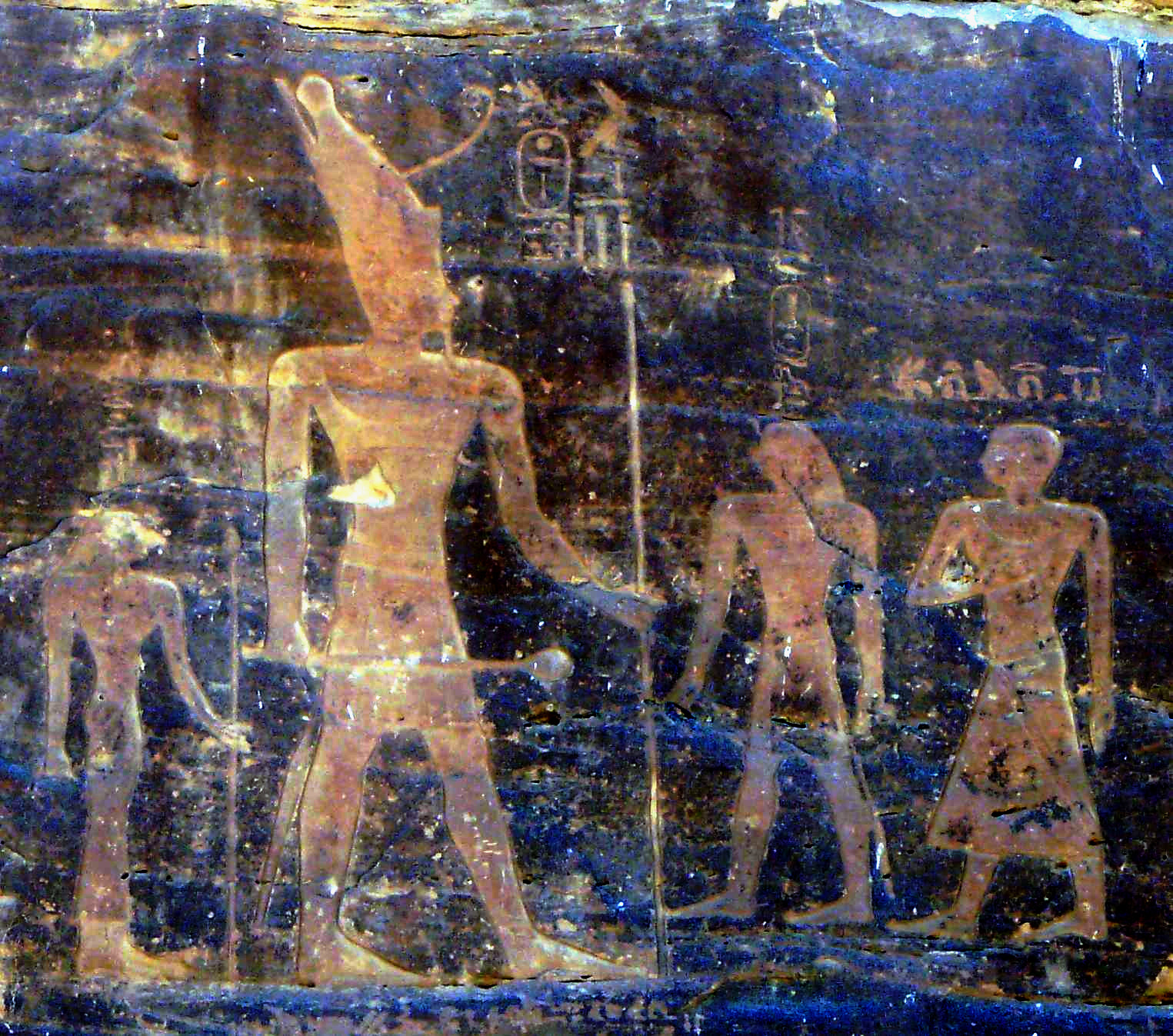
Silsileh rock relief depicting a giant king Mentuhotep II, on the right Intef III and the treasurer Kheti and, on the left, queen Iah

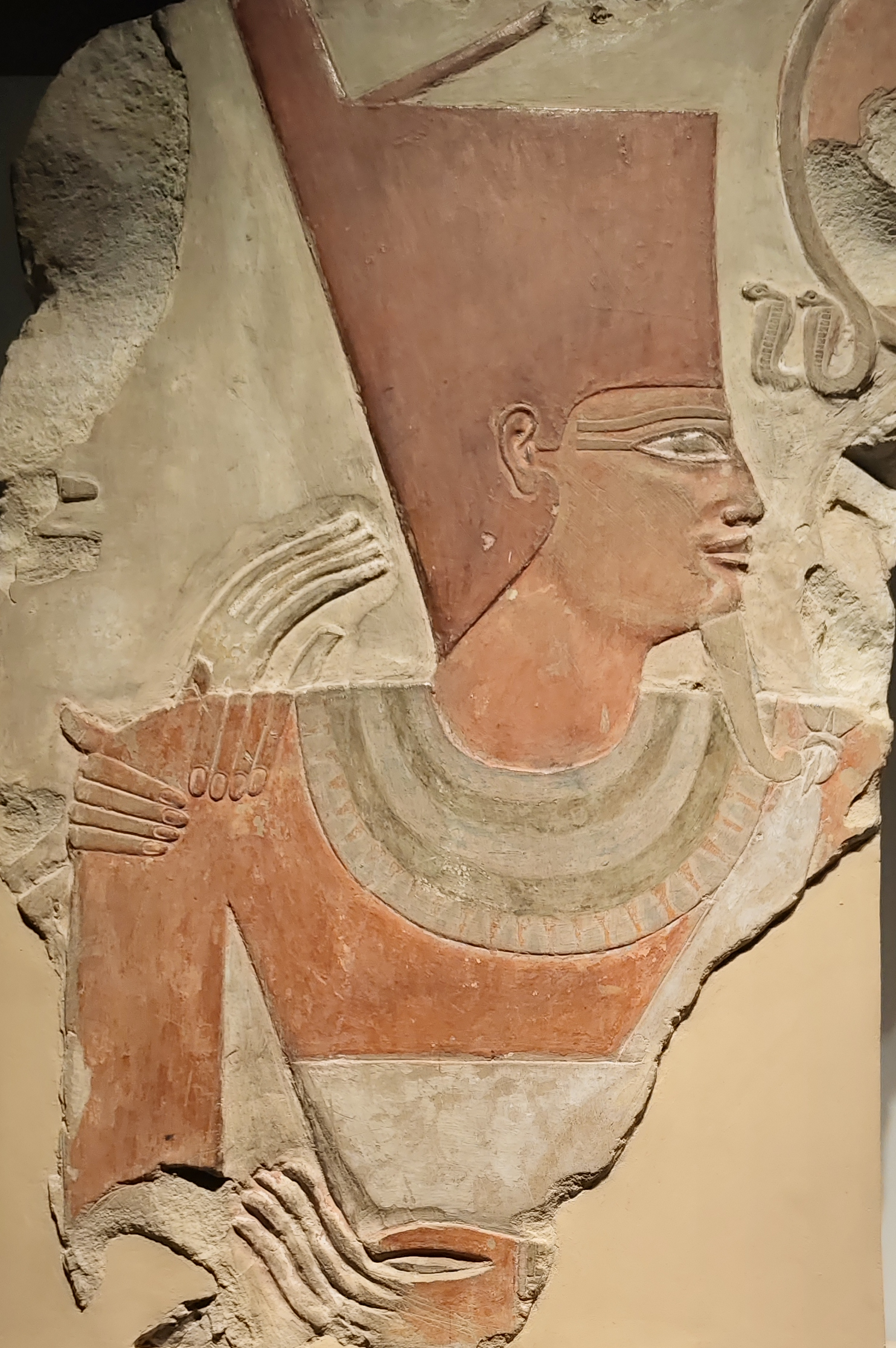
Mentuhotep II, wearing the Deshret, on a painted relief carving from his mortuary temple in Deir el Bahri, British Museum

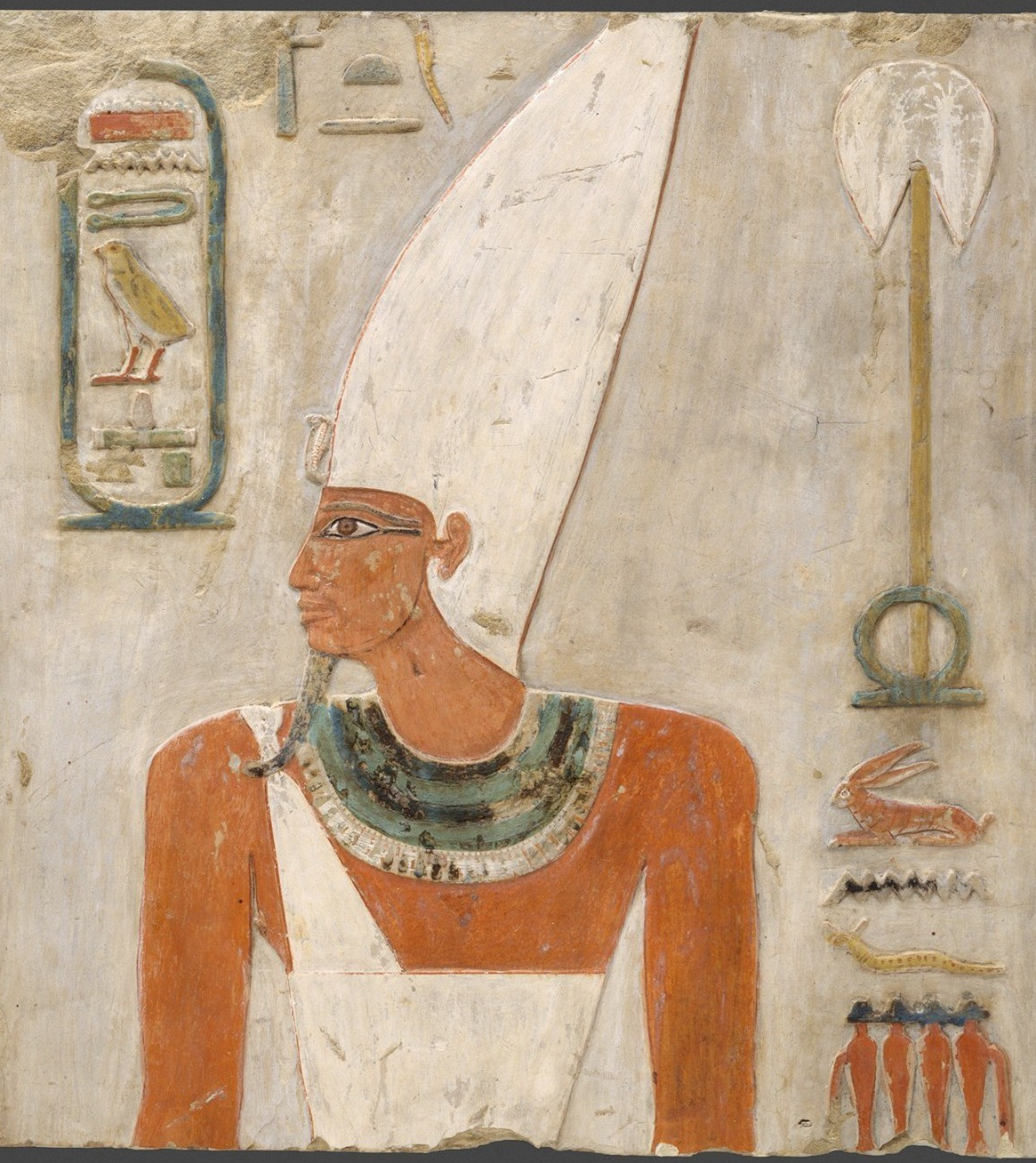
Mentuhotep II, wearing the Hedjet, on a painted relief carving from his mortuary temple in Deir el Bahri, Metropolitan Museum of Art

Mentuhotep II is considered to be the first ruler of the Middle Kingdom of Egypt. The Turin Canon credits him with a reign of 51 years. Many Egyptologists have long considered two rock reliefs, showing Mentuhotep II towering over smaller figures labeled king "Intef", to be conclusive evidence that his predecessor Intef III was his own father; this is, however, not entirely certain, as these reliefs may have had other propagandistic purposes, and there are other difficulties surrounding Mentuhotep's true origin, his three name-changes, and his frequent attempts to claim descent from various gods.

=== Early reign ===
When he ascended the Theban throne, Mentuhotep II inherited the vast land conquered by his predecessors from the first cataract in the south to Abydos and Tjebu in the north. Mentuhotep II's first fourteen years of reign seem to have been peaceful in the Theban region as there are no surviving traces of conflict firmly datable to that period. In fact, the general scarcity of testimonies from the early part of Mentuhotep's reign might indicate that he was young when he ascended the throne, a hypothesis consistent with his 51 years long reign.

=== Reunification of Egypt ===
In the 14th year of his reign, an uprising occurred in the north. This uprising is most probably connected with the ongoing conflict between Mentuhotep II based in Thebes and the rival 10th Dynasty based at Herakleopolis who threatened to invade Upper Egypt. The 14th year of Mentuhotep's reign is indeed named Year of the crime of Thinis. This certainly refers to the conquest of the Thinite region by the Herakleopolitan kings who apparently desecrated the sacred ancient royal necropolis of Abydos in the process. Mentuhotep II subsequently dispatched his armies to the north. The famous tomb of the warriors at Deir el-Bahari (MMA 507) discovered in the 1920s, contained the linen-wrapped, unmummified bodies of 60 soldiers all killed in battle, their shroud bearing Mentuhotep II's cartouche. Due to its proximity to the Theban royal tombs, the tomb of the warriors is believed to be that of heroes who died during the conflict between Mentuhotep II and his foes to the north. Merikare, the ruler of Lower-Egypt at the time may have died during the conflict, which further weakened his kingdom and gave Mentuhotep the opportunity to reunite Egypt. The exact date when reunification was achieved is not known, but it is assumed to have happened shortly before year 39 of his reign. Indeed, evidence shows that the process took time, maybe due to the general insecurity of the country at the time: commoners were buried with weapons, the funerary stelae of officials show them holding weapons instead of the usual regalia and when Mentuhotep II's successor sent an expedition to Punt some 20 years after the reunification, they still had to clear the Wadi Hammamat of rebels loyal to the fallen Herakleopolitan rulers.

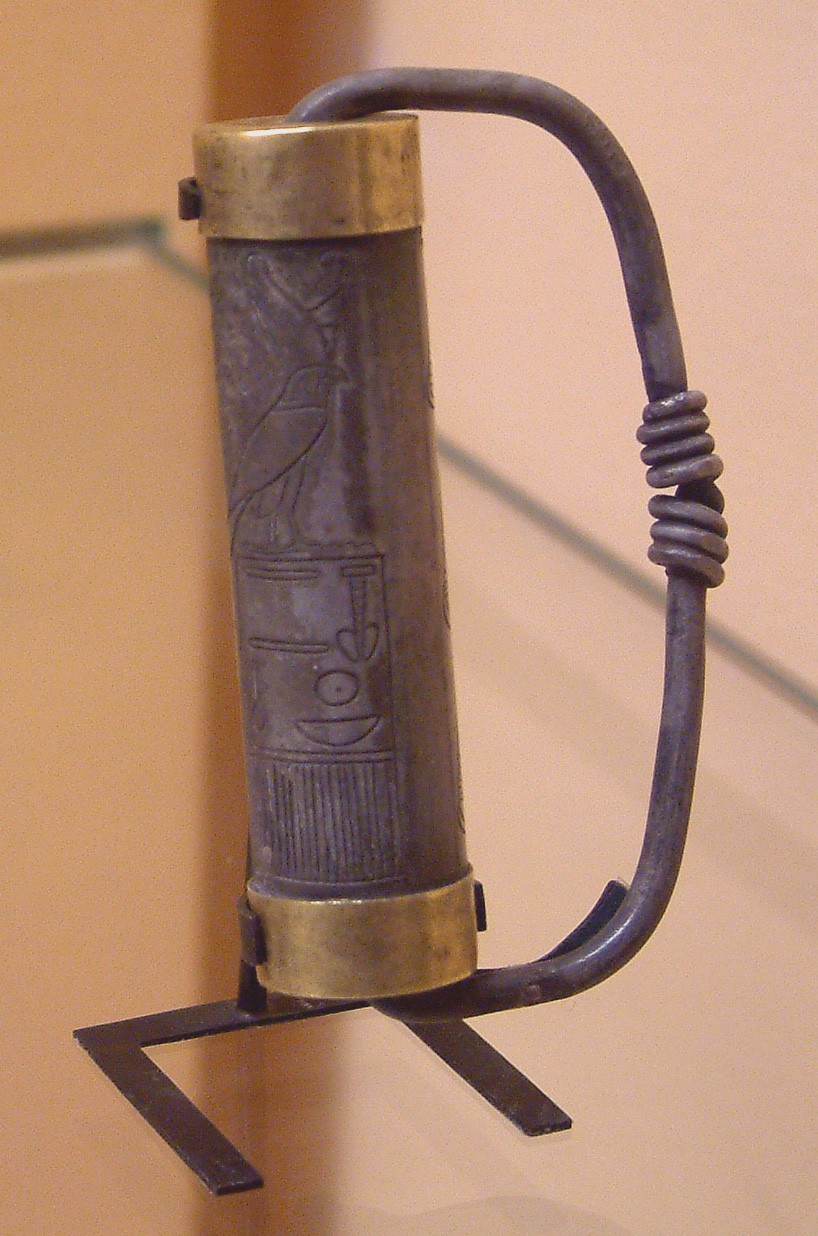
Cylinder seal of Mentuhotep II, Musée du Louvre

Following the reunification, Mentuhotep II was considered by his subjects to be divine, or half divine. This was still the case during the late 12th Dynasty some 200 years later: Senusret III and Amenemhat III erected stelae commemorating opening of the mouth ceremonies practiced on Mentuhotep II's statues.

=== Military activities outside Egypt ===
Mentuhotep II launched military campaigns under the command of his vizier Khety south into Nubia, which had gained its independence during the First Intermediate Period, in his 29th and 31st years of reign. This is the first attested appearance of the term Kush for Nubia in Egyptian records. In particular, Mentuhotep posted a garrison on the island fortress of Elephantine so troops could rapidly be deployed southwards. There is also evidence of military actions against Canaan. An inscription was found at Gabal El Uweinat close to the borders of modern Libya and Sudan naming the king and attesting at least trade contacts to this region.

=== Officials ===
The king reorganized the country and placed a vizier at the head of the administration. The viziers of his reign were Bebi and Dagi. His treasurer was Kheti who was involved in organising the sed festival for the king. Other important officials were the treasurer Meketre and the overseer of sealers Meru. His general was Intef.

=== Reorganization of the government ===
Throughout the First Intermediate Period and until Mentuhotep II's reign, the nomarchs held important powers over Egypt. Their office had become hereditary during the 6th Dynasty and the collapse of central power assured them complete freedom over their lands. After the unification of Egypt however, Mentuhotep II initiated a strong policy of centralization, reinforcing his royal authority by creating the posts of Governor of Upper Egypt and Governor of Lower Egypt who had power over the local nomarchs.

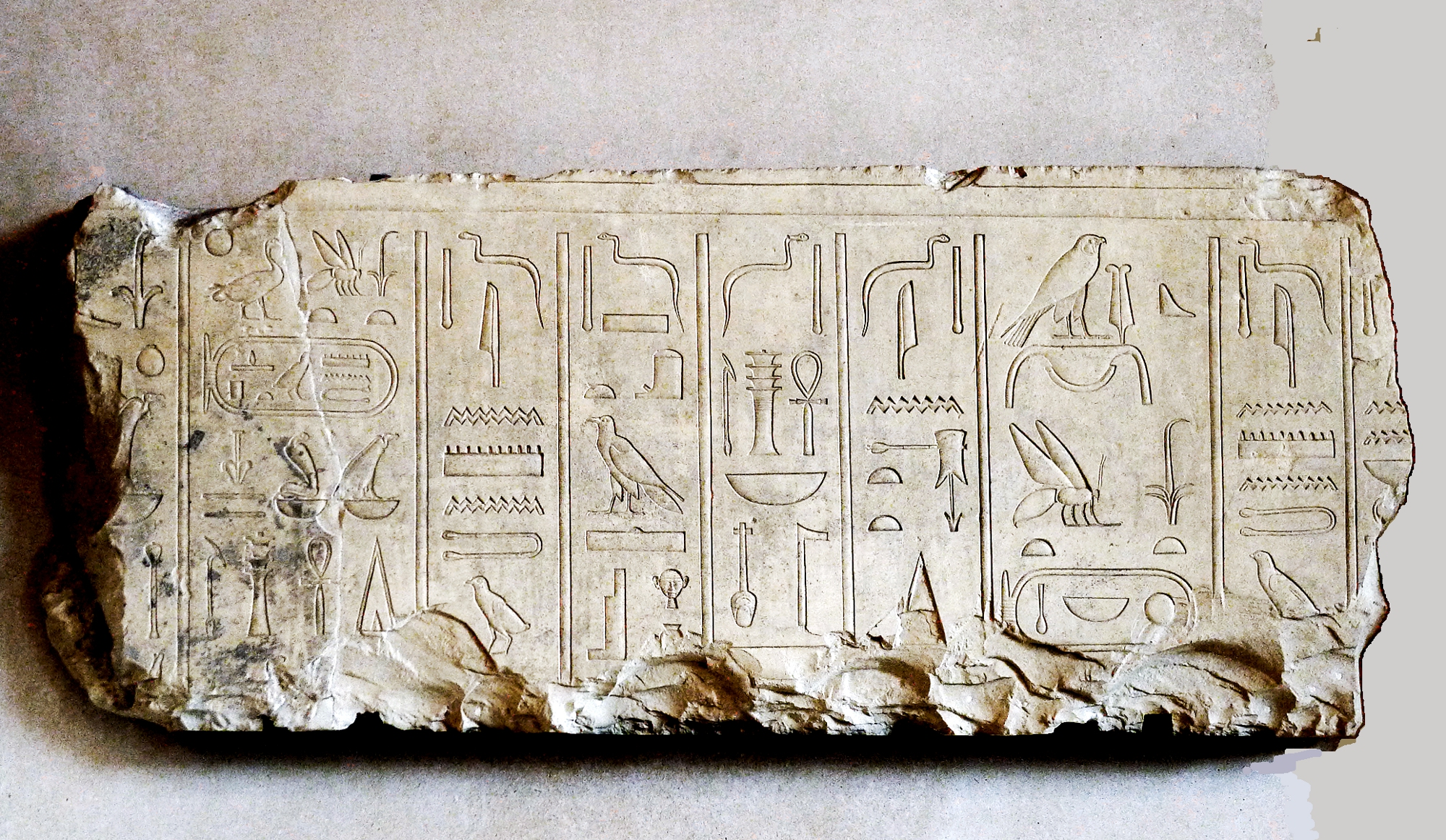
Mentuhotep's third titulary from his temple of Montu at Tod

Mentuhotep also relied on a mobile force of royal court officials who further controlled the deeds of the nomarchs. Finally, the nomarchs who supported the 10th Dynasty, such as the governor of Asyut, certainly lost their power to the profit of the king. In the meantime, Mentuhotep II started an extensive program of self-deification emphasizing the divine nature of the ruler.

=== Titulary ===
Mentuhotep II's self-deification program is evident from temples he built where he is represented wearing the headgear of Min and Amun. But perhaps the best evidence for this policy is his three titularies: his second Horus and Nebty names were The divine one of the white crown while he is also referred to as the son of Hathor at the end of his reign.

Mentuhotep II changed his titulary twice during his reign: the first time in his 14th regnal year, marking the initial successes of his campaign against Herakleopolis Magna to the north. The second time on or shortly before his 39th year of reign, marking the final success of that campaign, and his reunification of all of Egypt. More precisely, this second change may have taken place on the occasion of the sed festival celebrated during his 39th year on the throne.

	First titulary	Second titulary	Third titulary
Horus name	S29 S34 F34 N16 N16 Seankhibtawy S.ˁnḫ-ib-tȝwy "He who invigorates the heart of the two lands"	R8 S2; Netjerihedjet; Nṯrj-ḥḏt "The divine one of the white crown"	F36 N16 N16; Sematawy; Smȝ-tȝ.w(j) "He who unifies the two lands"
Nebty name		R8 S2; Netjerihedjet; Nṯrj-ḥḏt "The divine one of the white crown"	F36 N16 N16; Sematawy; Smȝ-tȝ.w(j) "He who unifies the two lands"
Golden Horus name			N29 G5 S12 S9; Biknebuqashuty; Bjk-nbw-qȝ-šwtj "The Golden Falcon, lofty in plumes"
Prenomen		ra nb P8; Nebhepetre; Nb-ḥpt-Rˁ "The Lord of the rudder is Ra"	
Nomen	mn n T w Htp t p Mentuhotep; Mn-ṯw-ḥtp "Montu is satisfied"		

In general, the titularies of Mentuhotep II show a desire to return to the traditions of the Old Kingdom. In particular he adopted the complete five-fold titulary after his reunification of Egypt, seemingly for the first time since the 6th Dynasty, though known records are sparse for much of the First Intermediate Period that preceded him. Another proof that Mentuhotep II paid great attention to the traditions of the Old Kingdom is his second Nomen, sometimes found as

< O10 nb O28 n t O49 G39 Y5 V13 Htp >
Sematawy, Nebet-Iunet, Mentuhotep
sȝ Ḥw.t-Ḥr nb(.t) jwn.t Mnṯw-ḥtp
"He who unifies the two lands is the son of Hathor, the lady of Dendera, Mentuhotep"

This reference to Hathor rather than Re is similar to the titulary of Pepi I. Finally, in later king lists, Mentuhotep was referred to with a variant of his third titulary

< ra nb P8 >< Y5 n U33 Z7 Htp t p Z7 G7 >

== Monuments ==
Mentuhotep II commanded the construction of many temples though few survive to this day. In doing so, Mentuhotep followed a tradition started by his grandfather Intef II: royal building activities in the provincial temples of Upper Egypt began under Intef II and lasted throughout the Middle Kingdom. Most of the temple remains are also located in Upper Egypt, more precisely in Abydos, Aswan, Tod, Armant, Gebelein, Elkab, Karnak and Denderah.

=== Abydos ===
At Abydos, a well preserved funerary chapel called the Mahat chapel was found in 2014.

Mortuary Temple of Mentuhotep II in hieroglyphs
< N5 nb P8 > G25 Aa1 Q1 O24
3ḫ-swt-nb-ḥpt-Rˁ Akhsut Nebhepetre
"Transfigured are the places of Nebhepetre"
G25 Aa1 Q1 Z1 Z1 Z1 < N5 nb P8 >
3ḫ-swt-nb-ḥpt-Rˁ Akhsutnebhepetre
"Transfigured are the places of Nebhepetre"
G25 st t Z2 M17 Y5 N35 G7 O24
3ḫ-swt-Jmn Akhsutamun
"Transfigured are the places of Amun"
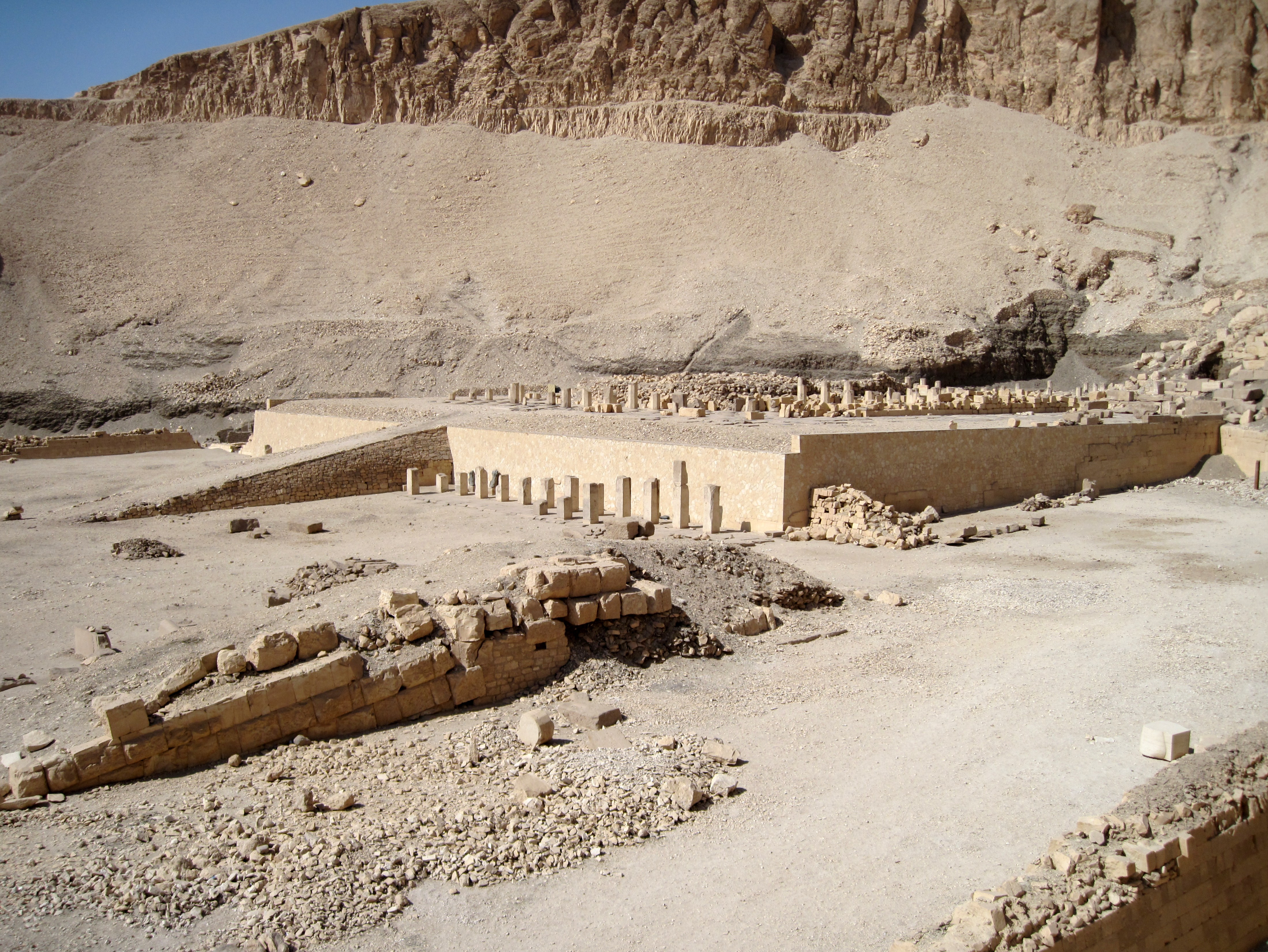

== Mortuary temple ==
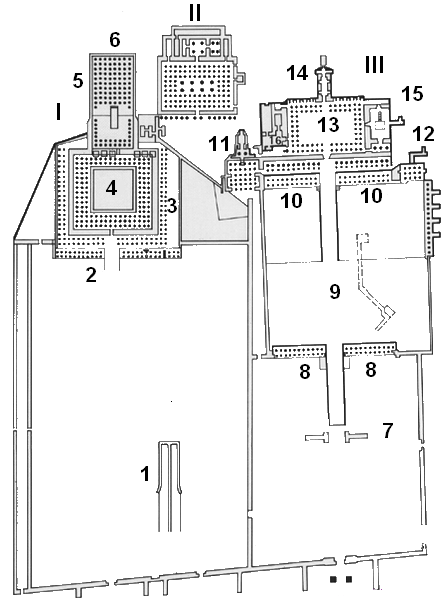
I Mentuhotep's mortuary temple, 1) Bab el-Hosan cache, 2) Lower pillared halls, 3) Upper hall, 4) core building, maybe a pyramid and between 3) and 4) is the ambulatory, 5) Hypostyle Hall, 6) Sanctuary

Mentuhotep II's most ambitious and innovative building project remains his large mortuary temple at Deir el-Bahri called Akh-sut Nebhepetre ("Transfigured are the places of Nebhepetre"). The many architectural innovations of the temple mark a break with the Old Kingdom tradition of pyramid complexes and foreshadow the Temples of Millions of Years of the New Kingdom. As such, Mentuhotep II's temple was certainly a major source of inspiration for the nearby, but 550-year later temples of Hatshepsut and Thutmose III.

However, the most profound innovations of Mentuhotep II's temple are not architectural but religious. First, it is the earliest mortuary temple where the king is not just the recipient of offerings but rather enacts ceremonies for the deities (in this case Amun-Ra). Second, the temple identifies the king with Osiris. Indeed, the decoration and royal statuary of the temple emphasizes the Osirian aspects of the dead ruler, an ideology apparent in the funerary statuary of many later pharaohs.

Finally, most of the temple decoration is the work of local Theban artists. This is evidenced by the dominant artistic style of the temple which represents people with large lips and eyes and thin bodies. At the opposite, the refined chapels of Mentuhotep II's wives are certainly due to Memphite craftsmen who were heavily influenced by the standards and conventions of the Old Kingdom. This phenomenon of fragmentation of the artistic styles is observed throughout the First Intermediate Period and is a direct consequence of the political fragmentation of the country.

=== Situation ===
The temple is located in the cliff at Deir el-Bahri on the west bank of Thebes. The choice of this location is certainly related to the Theban origin of the 11th Dynasty: Mentuhotep's predecessors on the Theban throne are all buried in close by saff tombs. Furthermore, Mentuhotep may have chosen Deir el-Bahri because it is aligned with the temple of Karnak, on the other side of Nile. In particular, the statue of Amun was brought annually to Deir el-Bahri during the Beautiful Festival of the Valley, something which the king may have perceived as beneficial to this funerary cult. Consequently, and until the construction of the Djeser-Djeseru some five centuries later, Mentuhotep II's temple was the final destination of the barque of Amun during the festival.

=== Discovery and excavations ===
In the early 19th century, the ruins of the temple of Mentuhotep II were completely covered with debris. They consequently went unnoticed until the second half of the century, in spite of extensive excavations performed on the nearby Mortuary Temple of Hatshepsut. Thus it was only in 1859, that Lord Dufferin and his assistants, Dr. Lorange and Cyril Clerke Graham, started to excavate the southwest corner of the hypostyle hall of Mentuhotep's temple. Clearing the immense mass of debris, they soon discovered the plundered grave of Queen Tem, one of Mentuhotep's wives. Realising the potential of the site, they then gradually worked their way to the sanctuary, where they found the granite altar of Mentuhotep with a representation of Amun-Re and various other finds such as the grave of Neferu TT319.

Finally, in 1898, Howard Carter discovered the Bab el-Hosan cache in the front court, where he uncovered the famous black seated large Ka statue of the king. It is believed that items in the cache, including the statue was placed there from the hypostyle hall when the temple was partially dismantled and repurposed during the New Kingdom, possibly during the nearby construction of Hatshepsut's temple.

In addition to statues of Mentuhotep II, statues of New Kingdom pharaoh Amenhotep I were also found in the mortuary temple of Mentuhotep II. Amenhotep's mortuary temple was largely demolished to make way for the lower terrace of the mortuary temple constructed later by Hatshepsut, and the royal statues inside of the temple were moved to the nearby mortuary temple of Mentuhotep II.

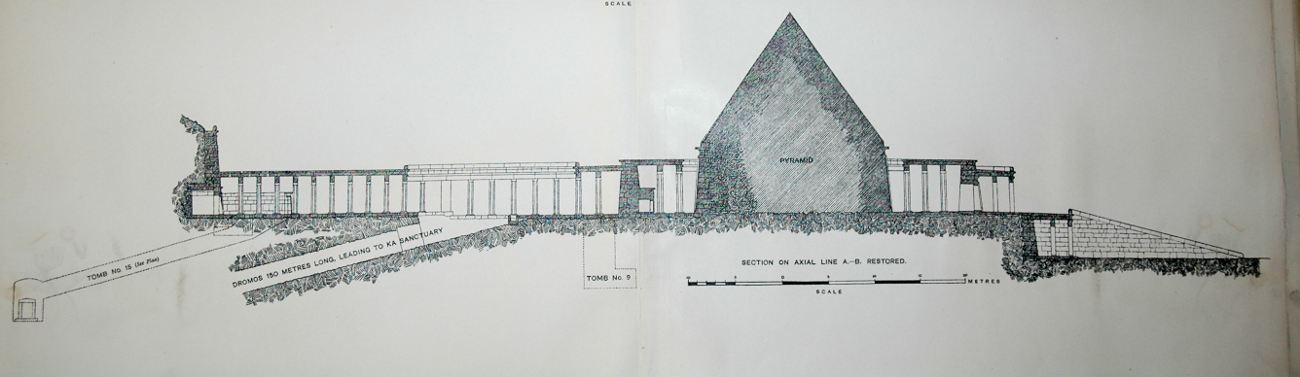
Cross-section of Mentuhotep II mortuary temple by E. Naville

The next important excavation works took place from 1903 to 1907 under the direction of Henri Édouard Naville, who worked there on behalf of the Egypt Exploration Fund. He was the first to undertake a systematic exploration of the temple. About ten years later, between 1920 and 1931, Herbert E. Winlock further excavated the temple for the Metropolitan Museum of Art. However, his results were published only in the form of preliminary reports in summary form. Finally, from 1967 to 1971, Dieter Arnold conducted research on the site on behalf of the German Archaeological Institute. He published his results in three volumes.

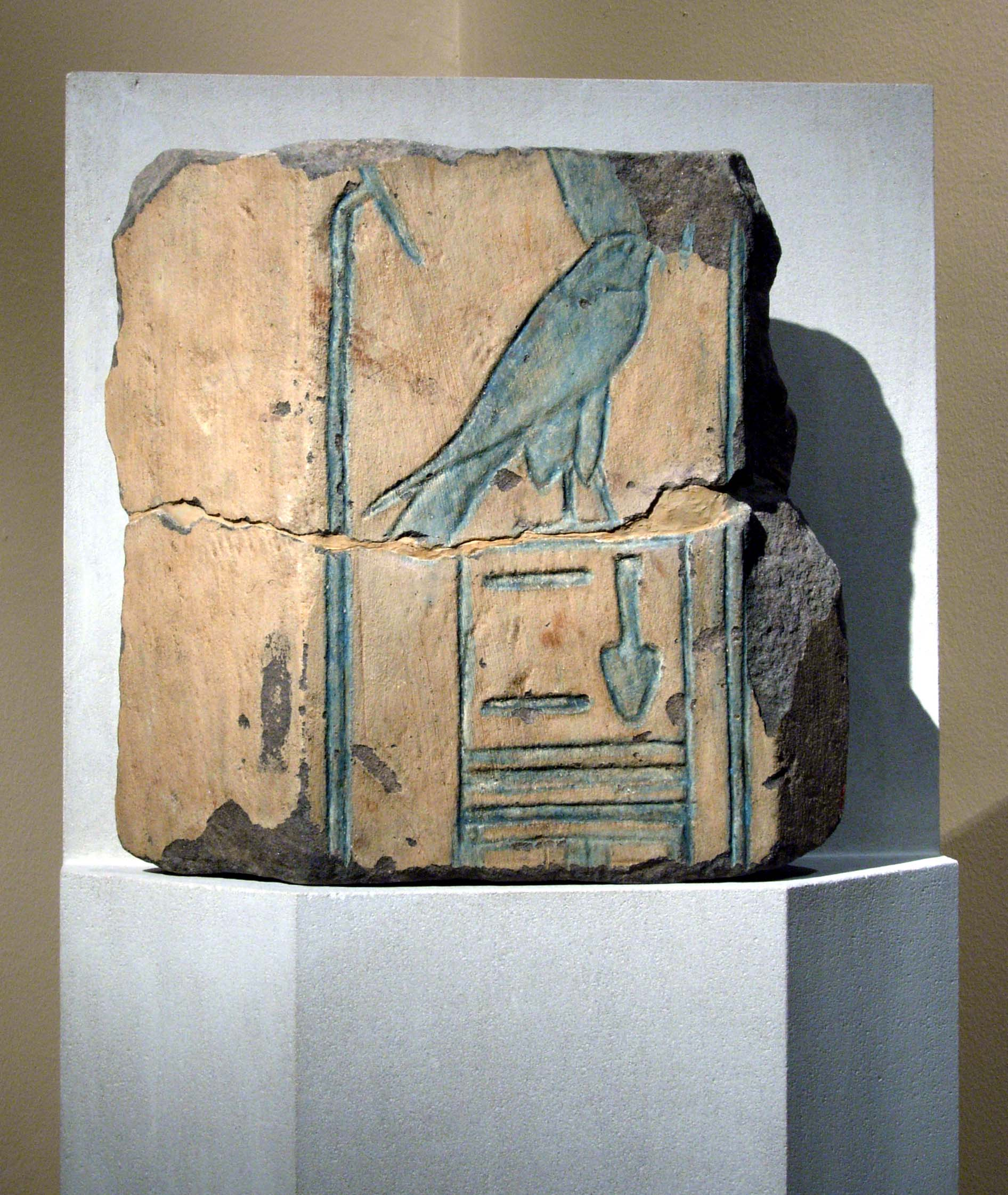
A column fragment with Mentuhotep's third horus name Sematawy on it

=== Foundational offerings ===
Under the four corners of the temple terrace, H. Winlock discovered four pits during his 1921–1922 excavations. These pits were dug into the ground before the construction of the temple for the purpose of foundation rituals. Indeed, when H. Winlock discovered them, they still contained many offerings: a cattle skull, pitchers and bowls filled with fruits, barley and bread and a mud brick bearing Mentuhotep II's name.

Further excavations of the pits undertaken in 1970 by Dieter Arnold revealed more food offerings such as bread and beef ribs, but also some bronze objects, a faience scepter and sheets of fabric. The sheets were marked in red ink at the corner, seven with the name of Mentuhotep II and three with that of Intef II.

=== Architecture ===
==== Causeway and courtyard ====
Similarly to the mortuary complexes of the Old Kingdom, Mentuhotep II's mortuary complex comprised two temples: the high temple of Deir el-Bahri and a valley temple located closer to the Nile on cultivated lands. The valley temple was linked to the high temple by a 1.2 km long and 46 m wide uncovered causeway. The causeway led to a large courtyard in front of the Deir el-Bahri temple.

The courtyard was adorned by a long rectangular flower bed, with fifty-five sycamore trees planted in small pits and six tamarisk plus two sycamore trees planted in deep pits filled with soil. This is one of the very few archaeologically documented temple-gardens of ancient Egypt that are known enough about to reconstruct its appearance. The maintenance of such a garden more than 1 km from the Nile into the arid desert must have required the constant work of many gardeners and an elaborate irrigation system.

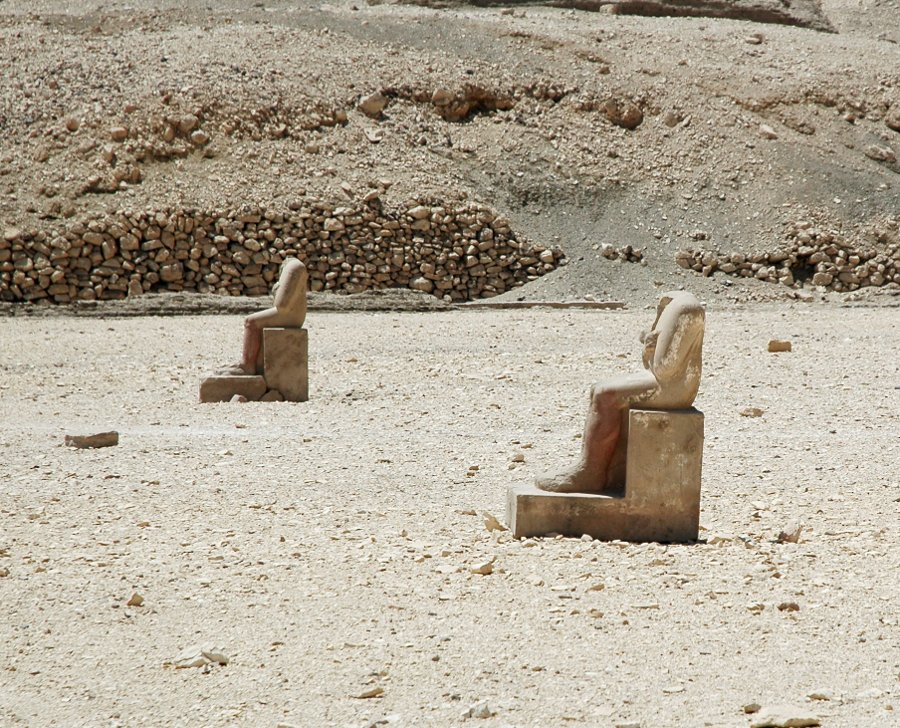
Seated statues of Mentuhotep II next to the causeway

Left and right of the processional walkway were at least 22 seated statues of Mentuhotep II wearing, on the south side, the White Crown of Upper Egypt and on the north side, the Red Crown of Lower Egypt. These were probably added to the temple for the celebration of Mentuhotep II's Sed festival during his 39th year on the throne. Some headless sandstone statues are still on site today. Another was discovered in 1921 during Herbert Winlock's excavations and is now on display at the Metropolitan Museum of Art.

==== Front part of the temple ====
West of the causeway is the main temple, which consisted of two parts. The front part of the temple is dedicated to Montu-Ra, a merger of the sun god Ra with the Theban god of war Montu, particularly worshipped during the 11th Dynasty. A ramp aligned with the central axis of the temple led to the upper terrace. The ramp that is visible today was constructed in 1905 by Édouard Naville over the remains of the original ramp, which only is visible in two places as the lowest two layers of the lateral limestone cladding. The eastern front part of the temple, on both sides of the rising ramp, consists of two porticos with a double row of rectangular pillars, which make the temple look like a saff tomb, the traditional burial of Mentuhotep II's 11th-Dynasty predecessors.

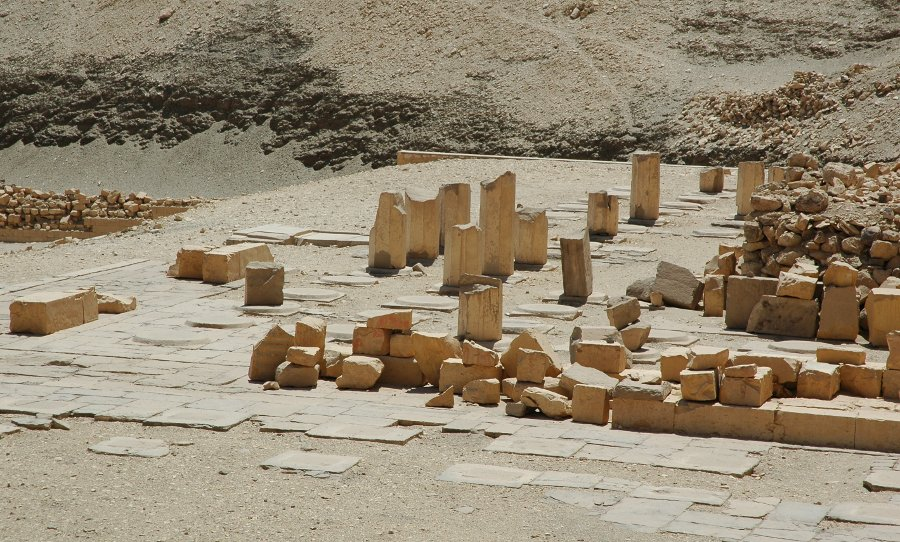
The ruins of the ambulatory

On the temple terrace, a 60-metre-wide, 43-metre-deep and 5-metre-high podium supports the upper hall surrounding an ambulatory and the core building. The ambulatory, separated from the upper hall by a 5-cubit-thick wall, comprised a total of 140 octagonal columns disposed in three rows. For most of these columns, only the base is still visible today.

The courtyard of the ambulatory was completely filled by the core building, a massive 22 m large and 11 m high construction. This edifice, located at the center of the temple complex, was excavated in 1904 and 1905 by Edouard Naville. He reconstructed it as a square structure topped by a small pyramid, a representation of the primeval mount which possibly resembled the superstructures of the royal tombs at Abydos. This reconstruction, supported by H. E. Winlock, was contested by D. Arnold, who argued that, for structural reasons, the temple could not have supported the weight of a small stone pyramid. Instead, he proposed that the edifice was flat-roofed, like a Mastaba.

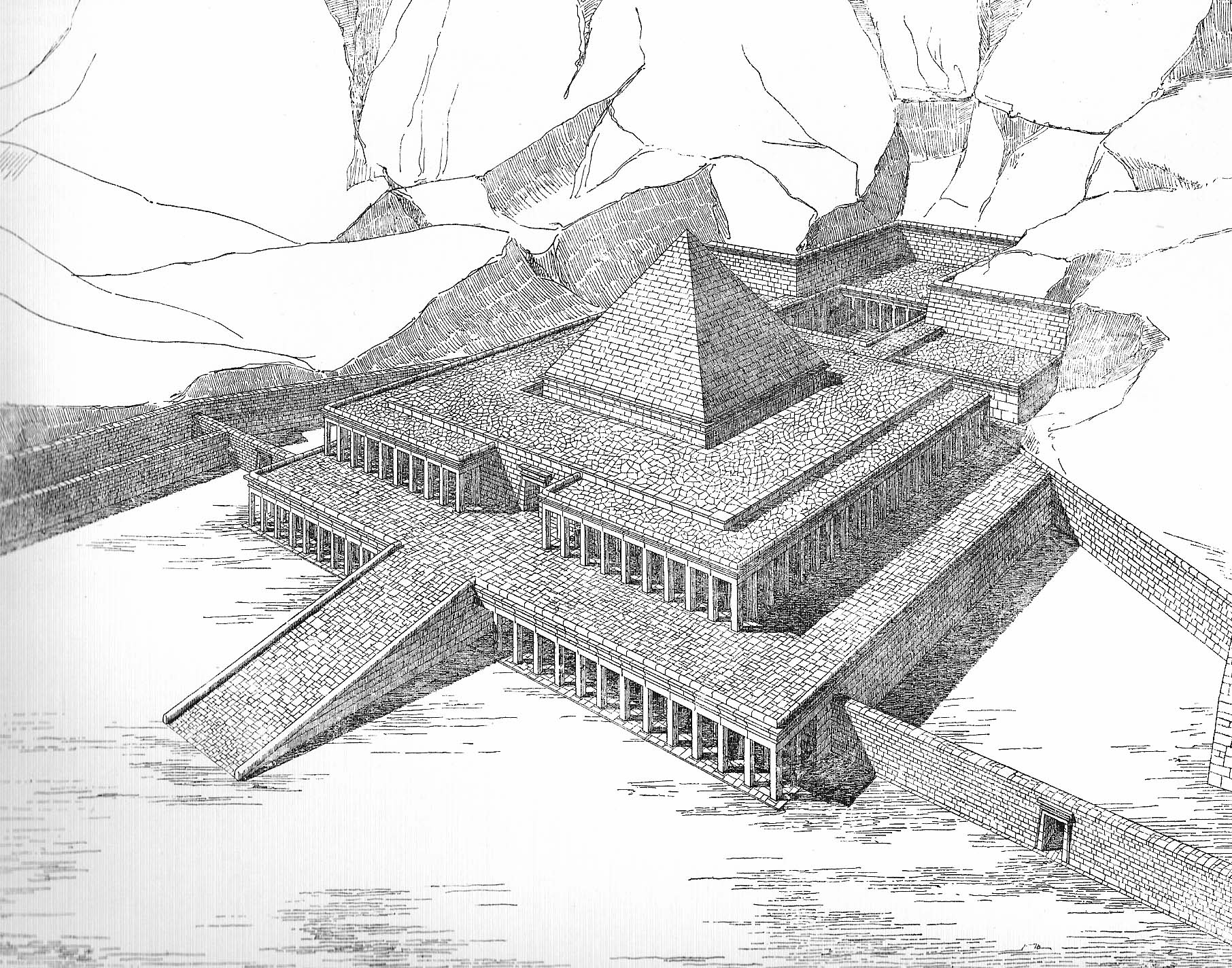
Reconstruction of Mentuhotep II's mortuary temple by Édouard Naville, as it would have looked like at its prime. The presence of a pyramid, stone or mudbruck, is debated.

==== Rear part of the temple ====
Behind the core edifice was the center of the cult for the deified king. The rear part of the temple was cut directly into the cliff and consisted of an open courtyard, a pillared hall with 82 octagonal columns and a chapel for a statue of the king. This part of the temple was dedicated to Amun-Ra.

The open courtyard is flanked on the north and south sides by a row of five columns and on the east side by a double row totalling sixteen columns. At the center of the open courtyard lies a deep dromos leading to the royal tomb. Archaeological finds in this part of the temple include a limestone altar, a granite stele and six granite statues of Senusret III. To the west, the courtyard leads to the hypostyle hall with its ten rows of eight columns each, plus two additional columns on both sides of the entrance. The hypostyle hall is separated from the courtyard by a wall and, being also higher, is accessed via a small ramp.

On the west end of the hypostyle hall lies the holiest place of the temple, a sanctuary dedicated to Mentuhotep and Amun-Ra leading to a small speos which housed a larger-than-life seated Ka statue of the king, which was later placed in a cache during the New Kingdom. The sanctuary itself housed a statue of Amun-Re and was surrounded on three sides by walls and on one side by the cliff. The inner and outer faces of these walls were all decorated with painted inscriptions and representations of the kings and gods in high relief. Surviving relief fragments show the deified king surrounded by the chief deities of Upper and Lower Egypt, Nekhbet, Seth, Horus and Wadjet, and on a par with them. The gods present the king with bundles of palm branches, the symbol of Millions of Years. This relief is a manifestation of the profound religious changes in the ideology of kingship since the Old Kingdom:

In the Old Kingdom, the king had been the lord of the pyramid complex, [...] now he is reduced to a human ruler dependent on the gods' goodwill. His immortality is no longer innate; it has to be bestowed on him by the gods.

=== Royal tomb ===
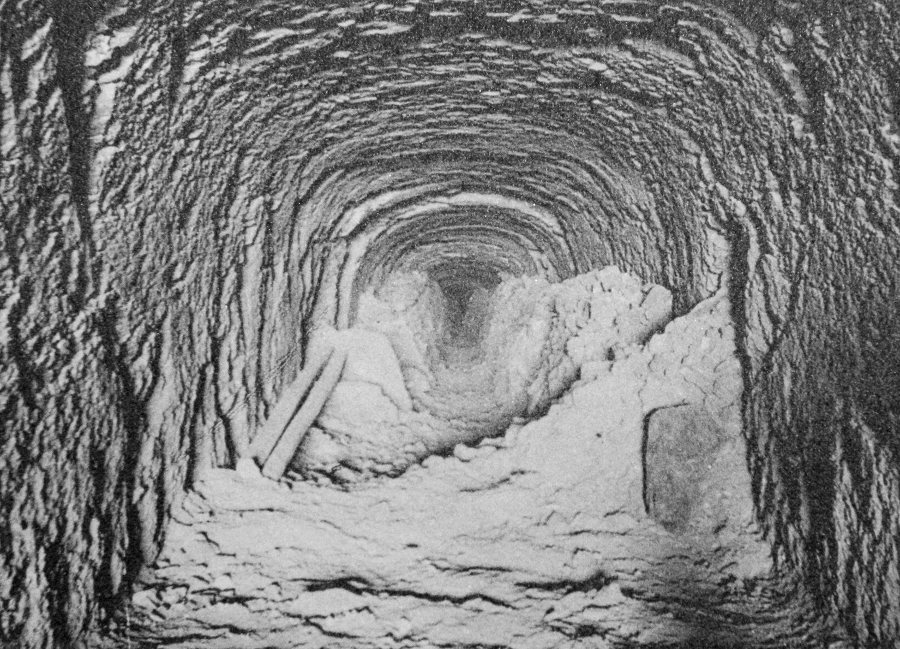
Corridor leading to Mentuhotep II's tomb

As mentioned above, the open courtyard of the rear part of the temple presents a dromos in its center. This dromos, a 150 m long straight corridor, leads down to a large underground chamber 45 m below the court which is undoubtedly the tomb of king Mentuhotep II. This chamber is entirely lined with red granite and has a pointed roof. It contained an alabaster chapel in the form of an Upper-Egyptian Per-wer sanctuary. This chapel was once closed by a double door now missing. Most of the grave goods that must have been deposited there are long gone as a result of the tomb plundering. The few remaining items were a scepter, several arrows, fragments of a wooden coffin, ointment vessels which left traces in the ground and a collection of models including ships, granaries and bakeries.

== Ancestry ==
Ancestors of Mentuhotep II

Intef II
Neferu I
Intef III
Mentuhotep II
Iah

== Gallery ==
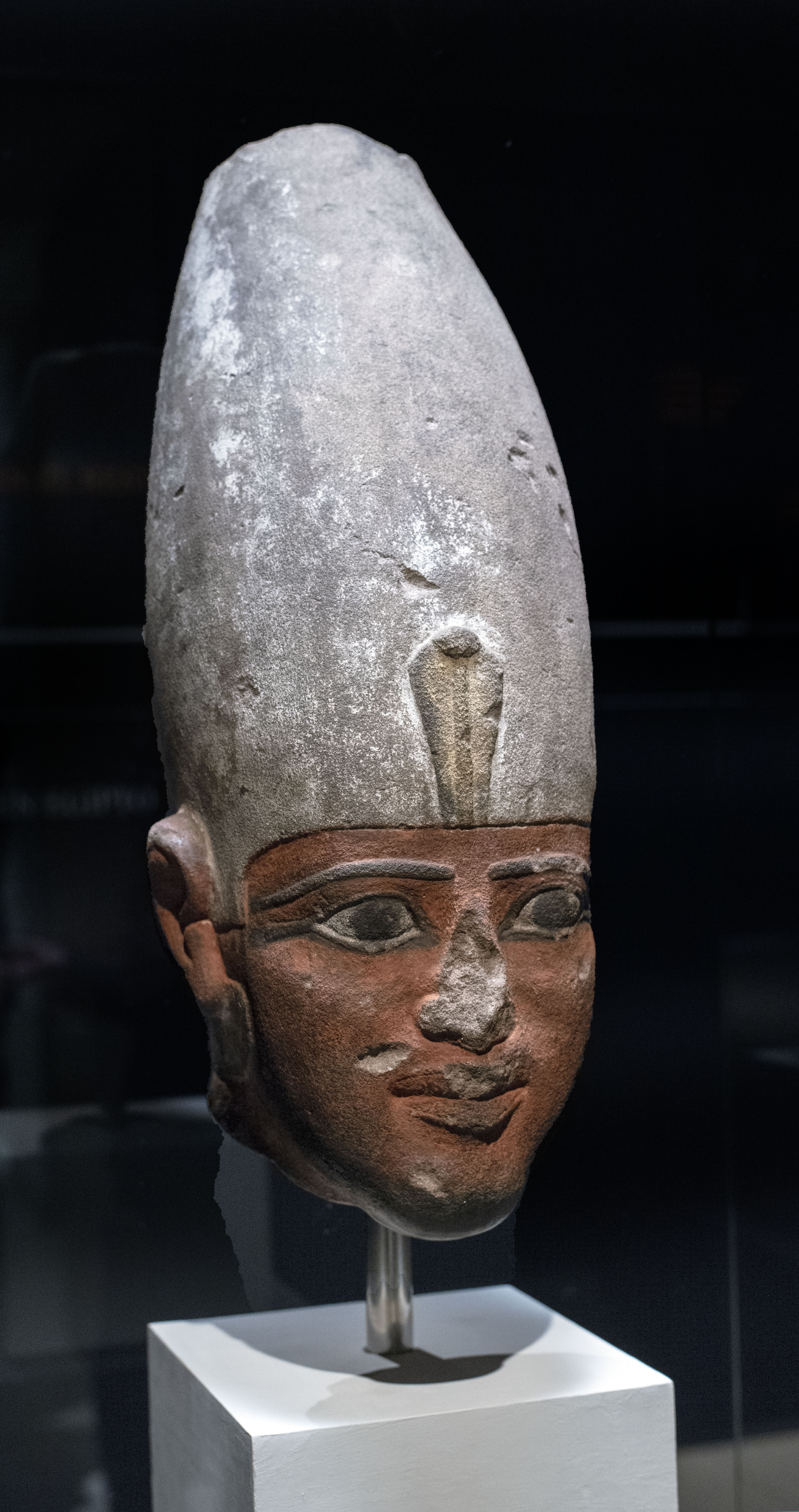
Head statue of Mentuhotep II now on display in British Museum

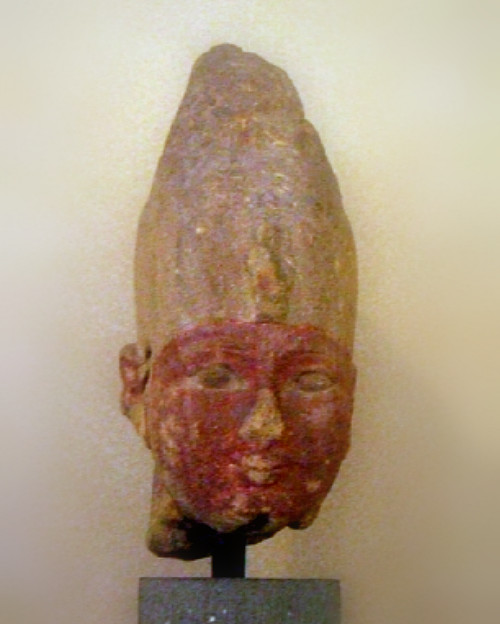
Head statue of Mentuhotep II originally in Thebes, now on display in the Museo Gregoriano Egiziano, Vatican

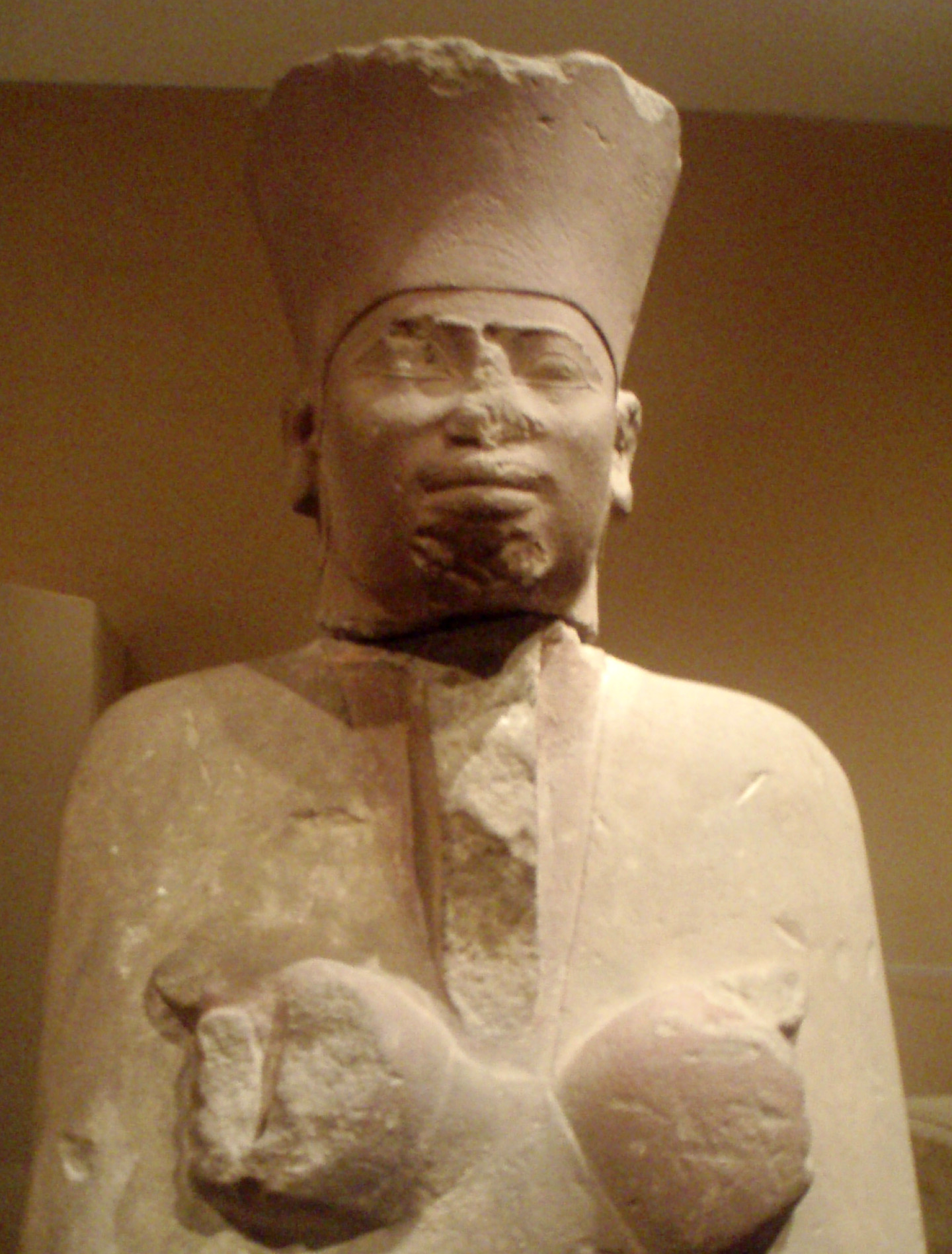
Painted sandstone statue of Mentuhotep II, discovered by H. Winlock

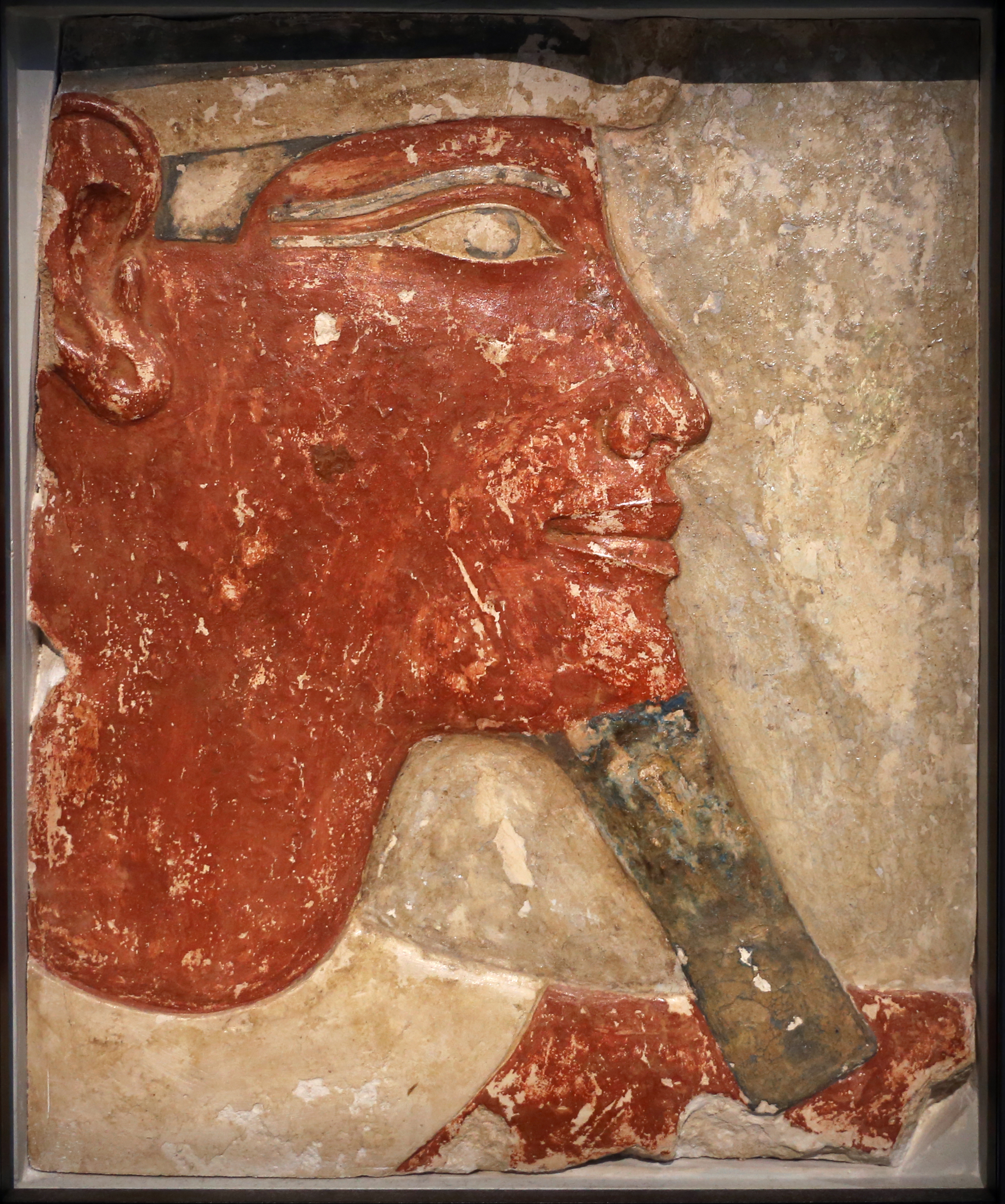
Painted Relief Fragment of Pharaoh Mentuhotep II - 11th Dynasty, depicted in the Memphite way

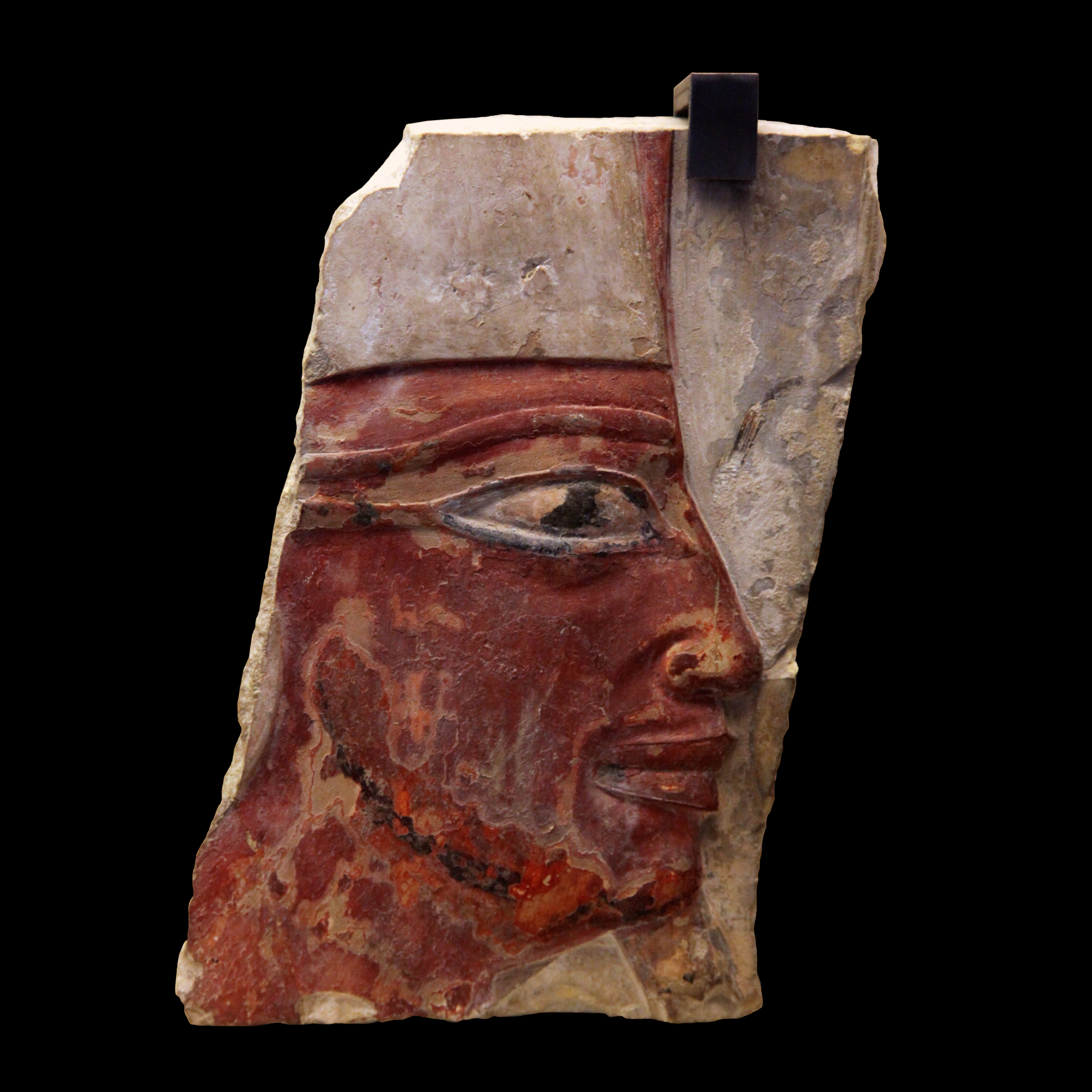
Painted Relief Fragment of Pharaoh Mentuhotep II - 11th Dynasty, depicted in the Theban way

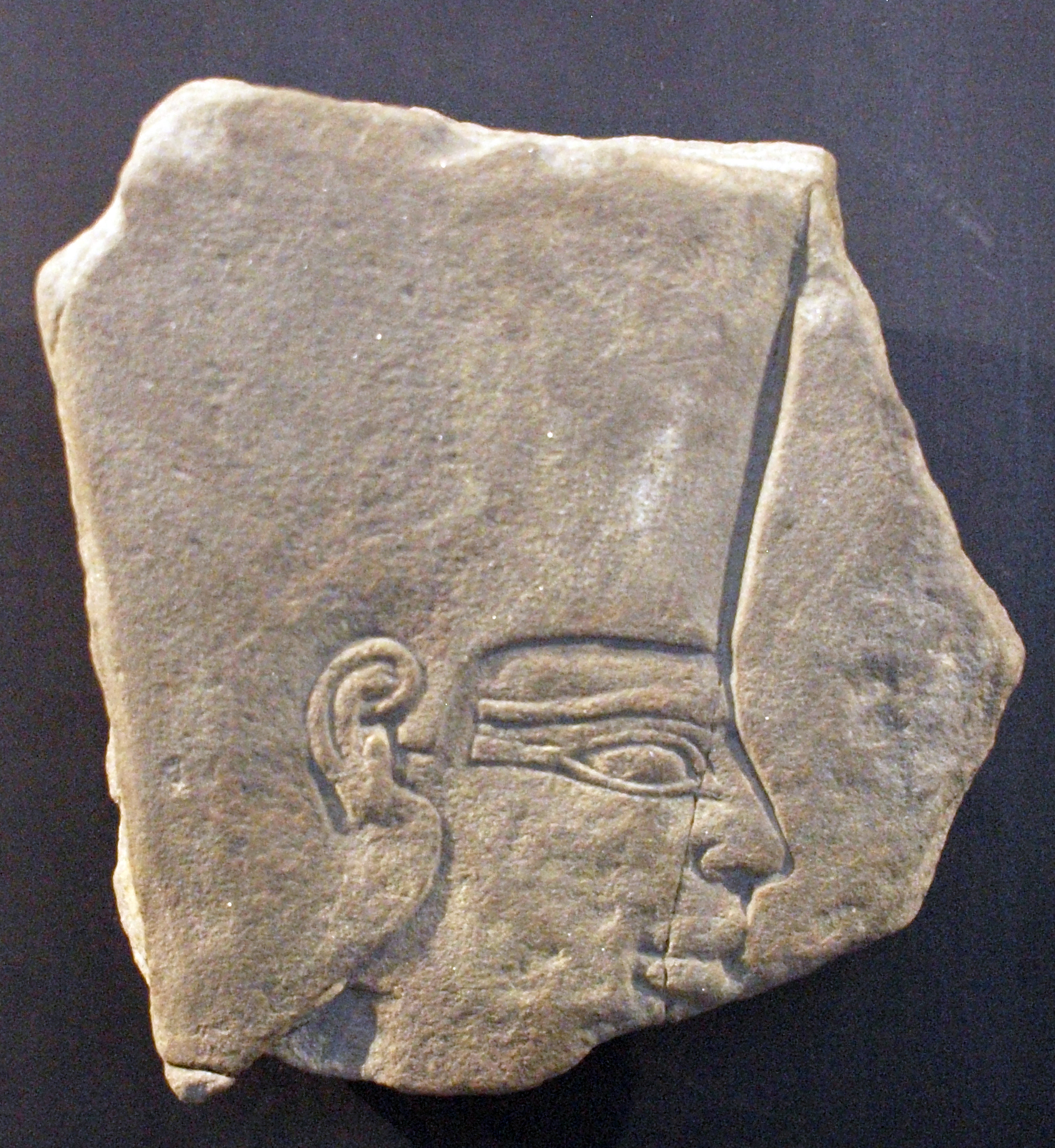
Relief Fragment of Pharaoh Mentuhotep II - 11th Dynasty

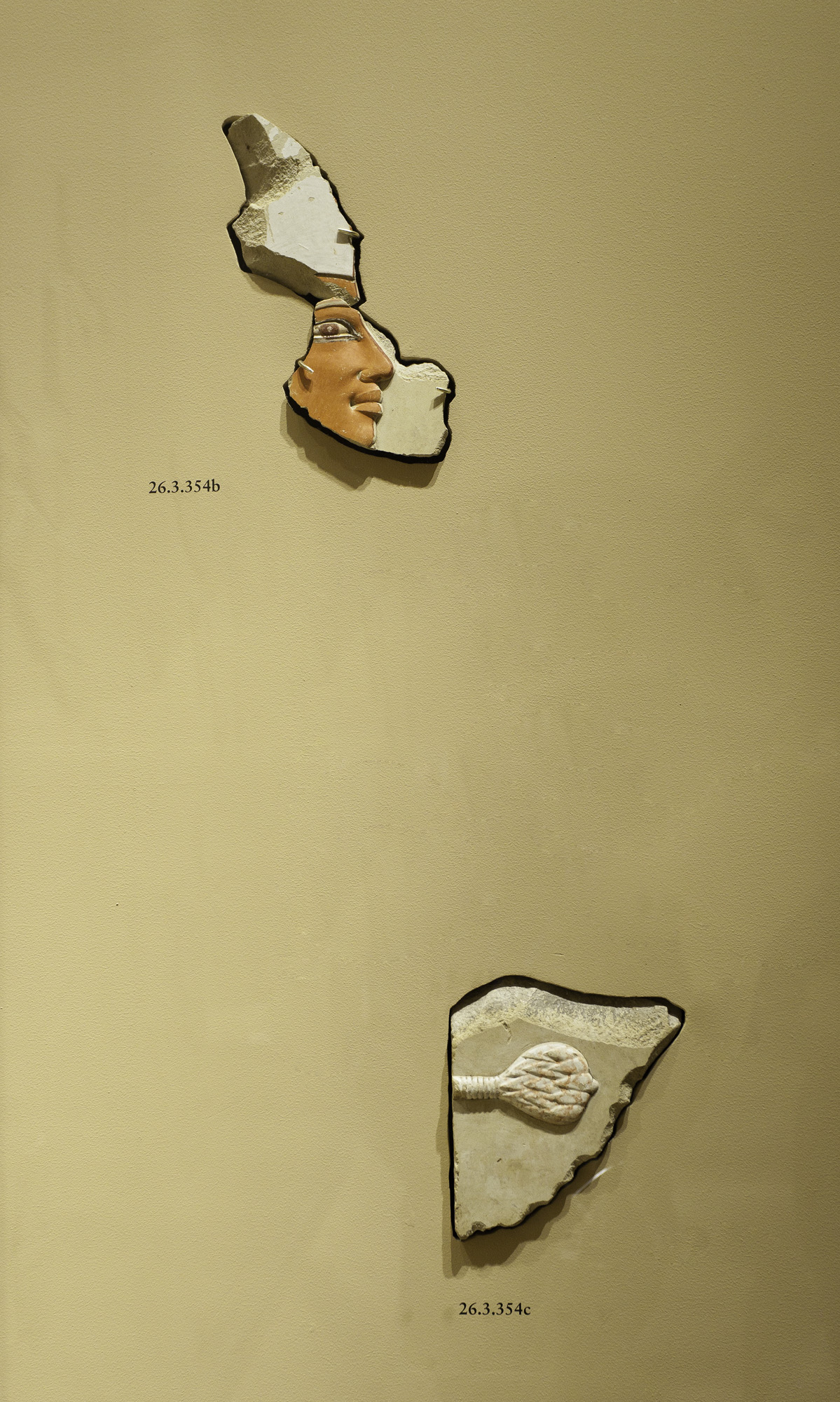
Relief Fragments from a Large Figure of Mentuhotep II

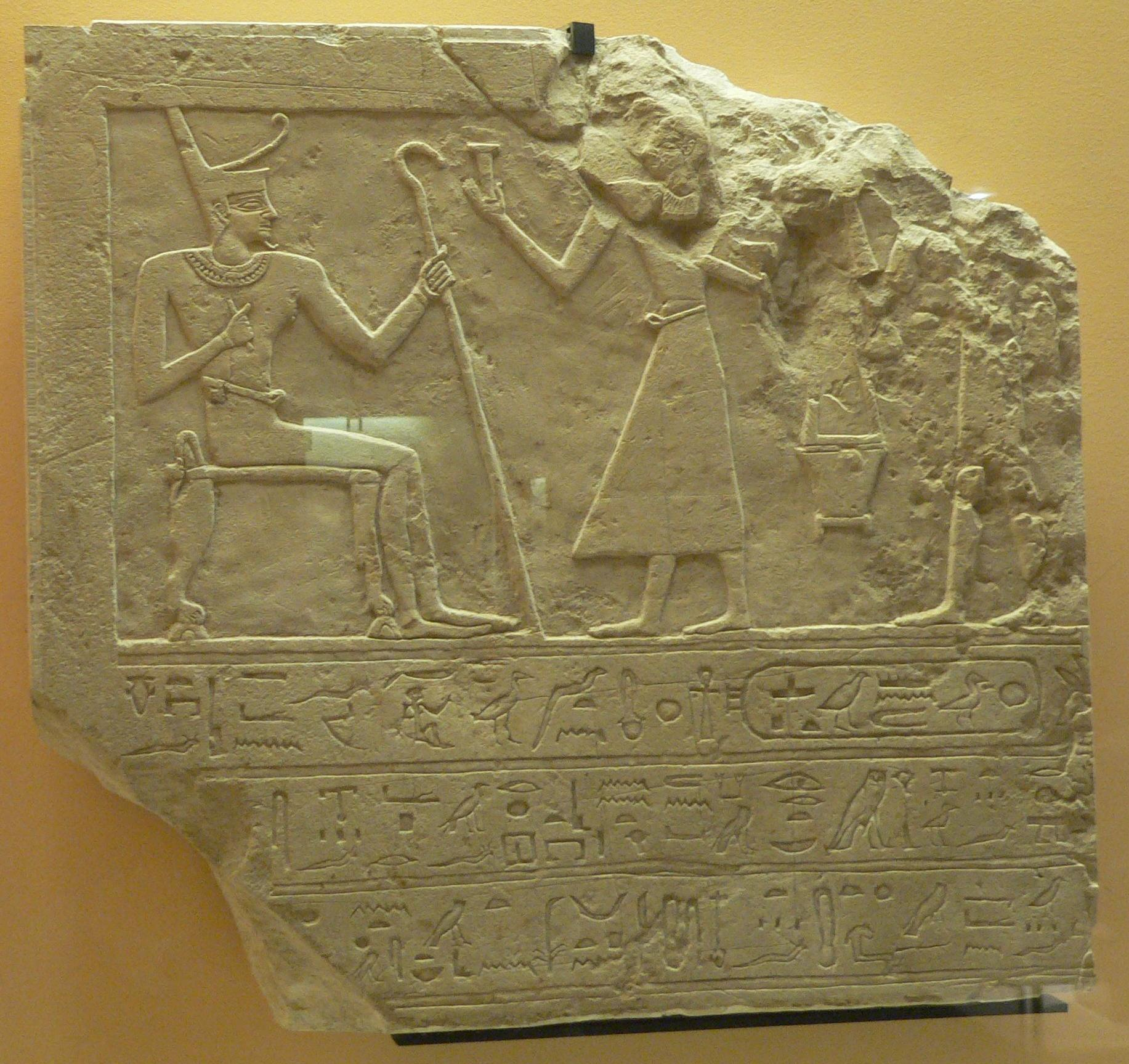
Mentuhotep II receives offering, Musée du Louvre

Mentuhotep II giving offerings to Montu, Temple of Montu in Tod.

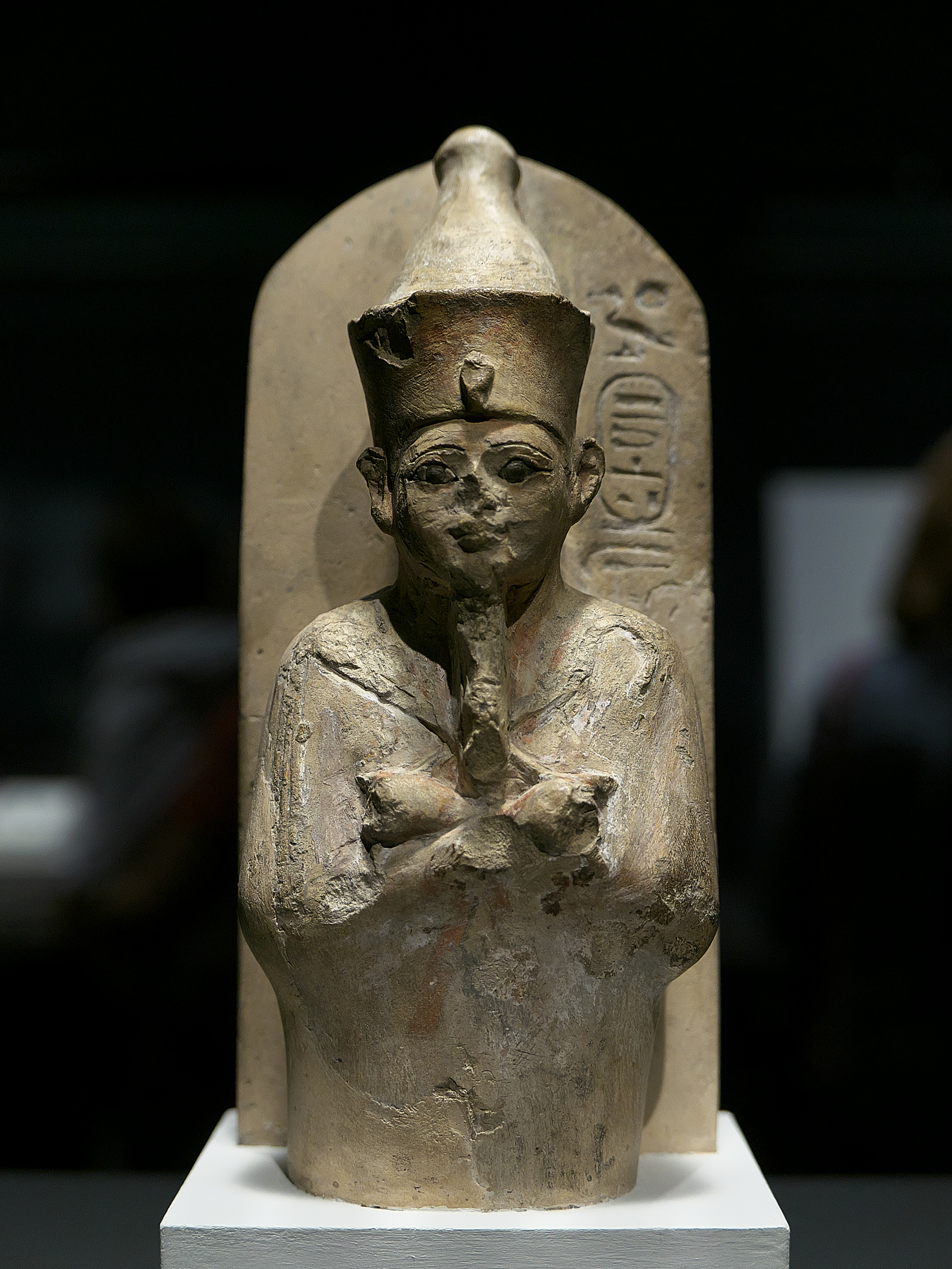
Small statue of Mentuhotep II now on display in British Museum

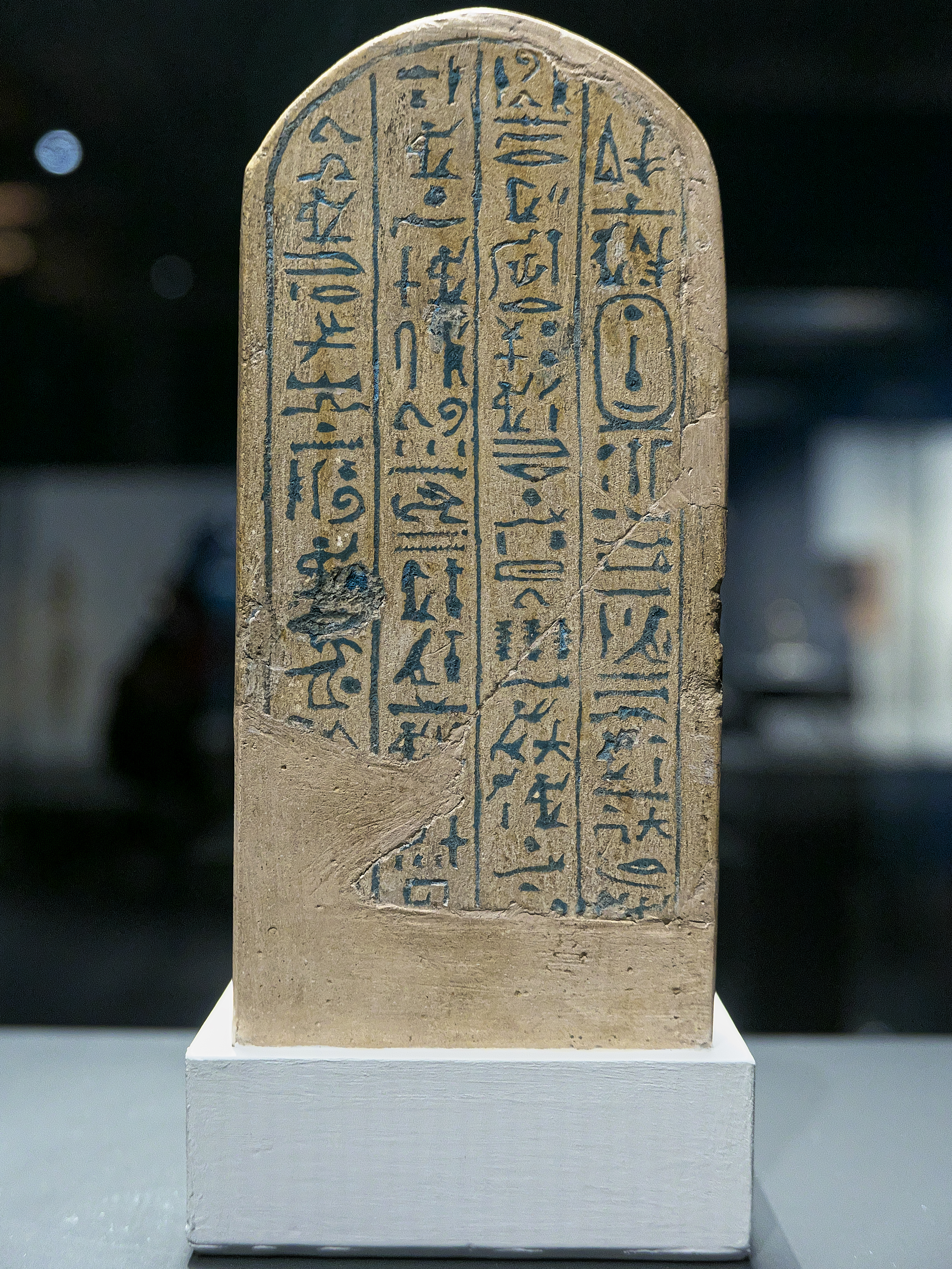
Back of the small statue of Mentuhotep II in British Museum, showing the inscribed stele

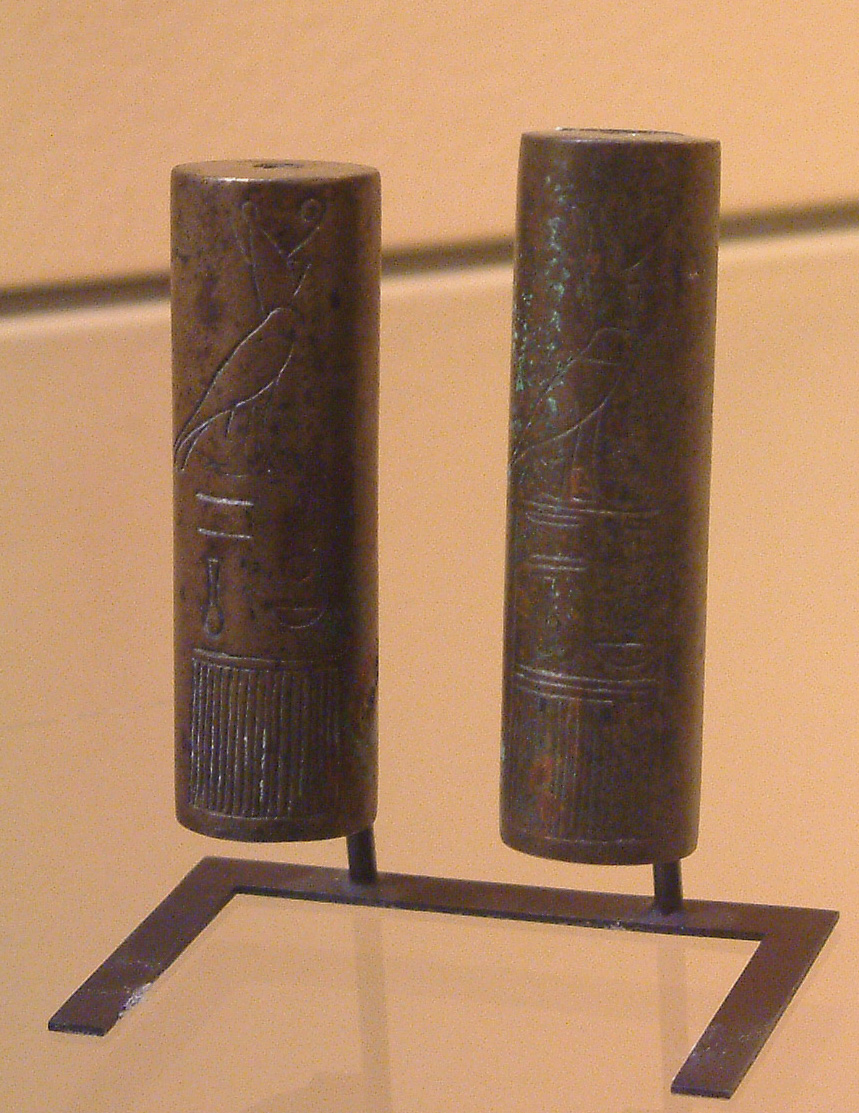
Cylinder seals of Mentuhotep II, Musée du Louvre

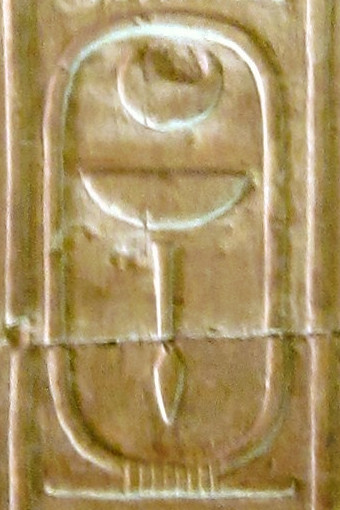
Mentuhotep II's cartouche on the Abydos king list

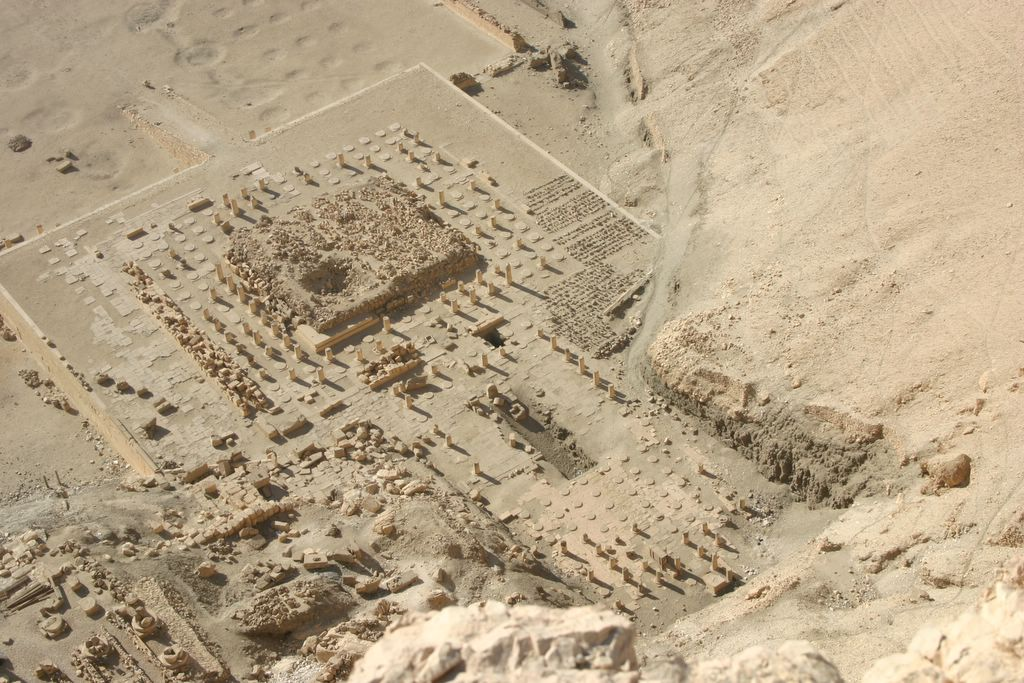
Aerial view of Mentuhotep II's mortuary temple at Deir el-Bahari

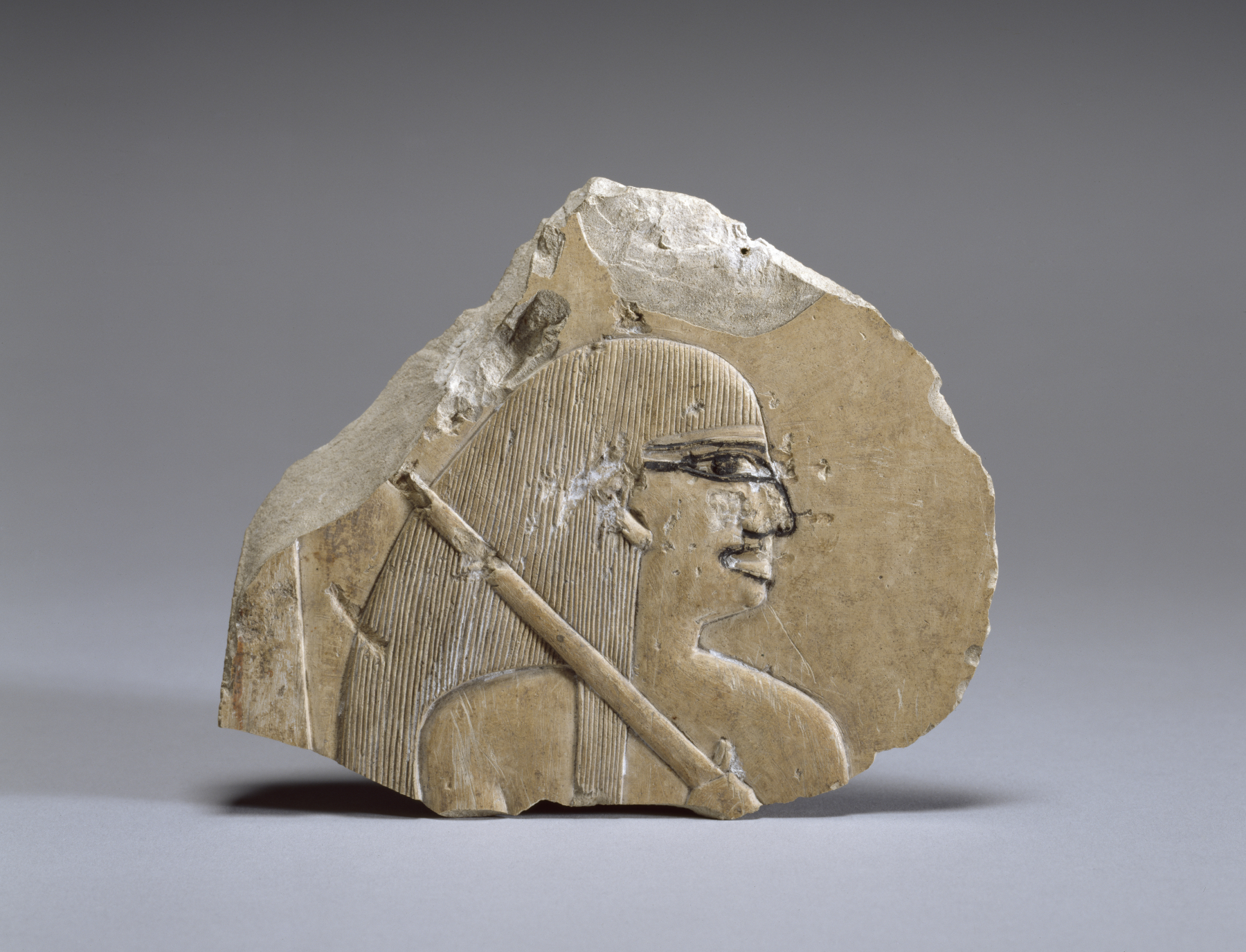
Shade-bearer of Neferu, Mentuhotep II's royal wife, in the typical regional artistic style of the 11th Dynasty

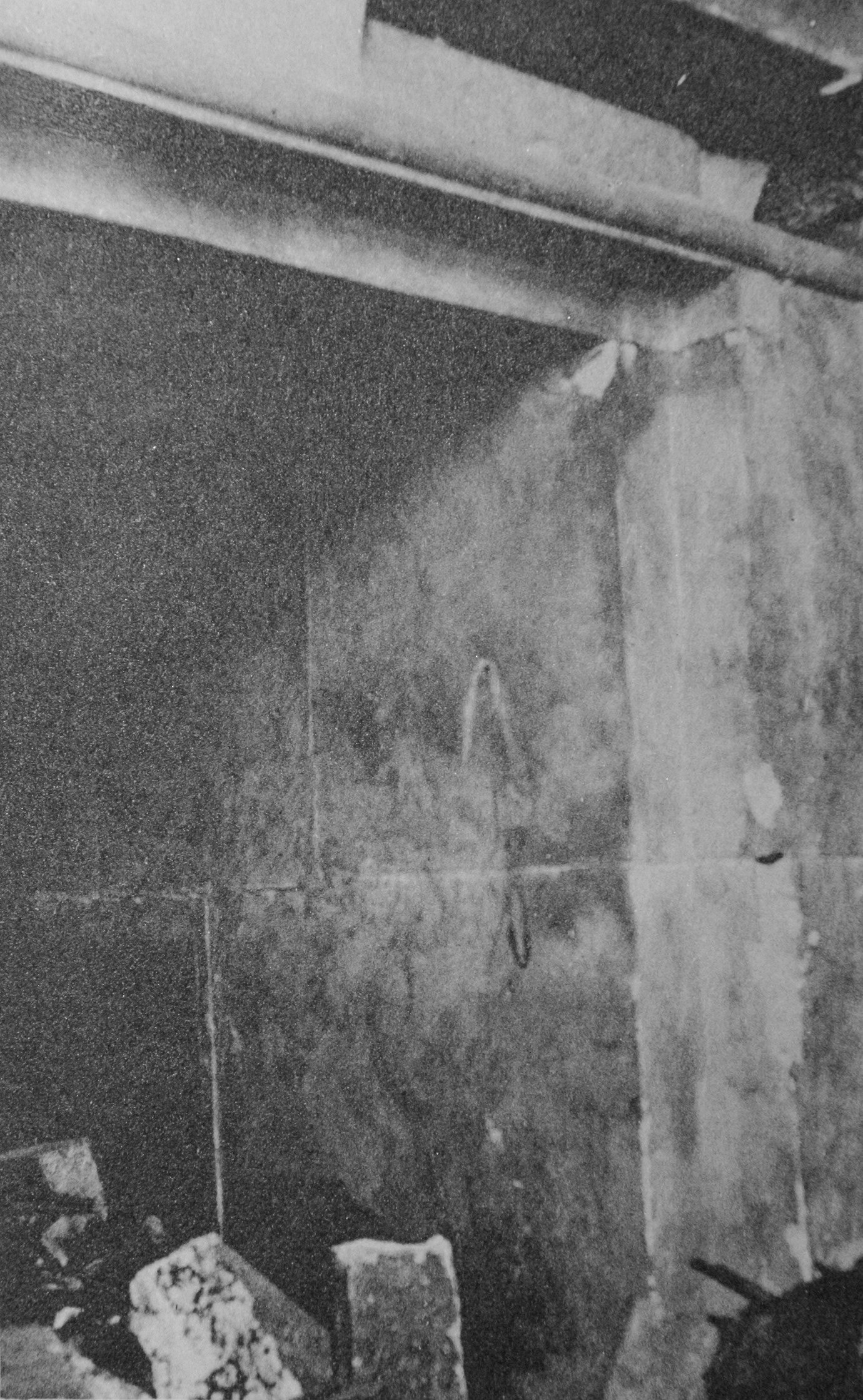
Entrance to Mentuhotep II's tomb

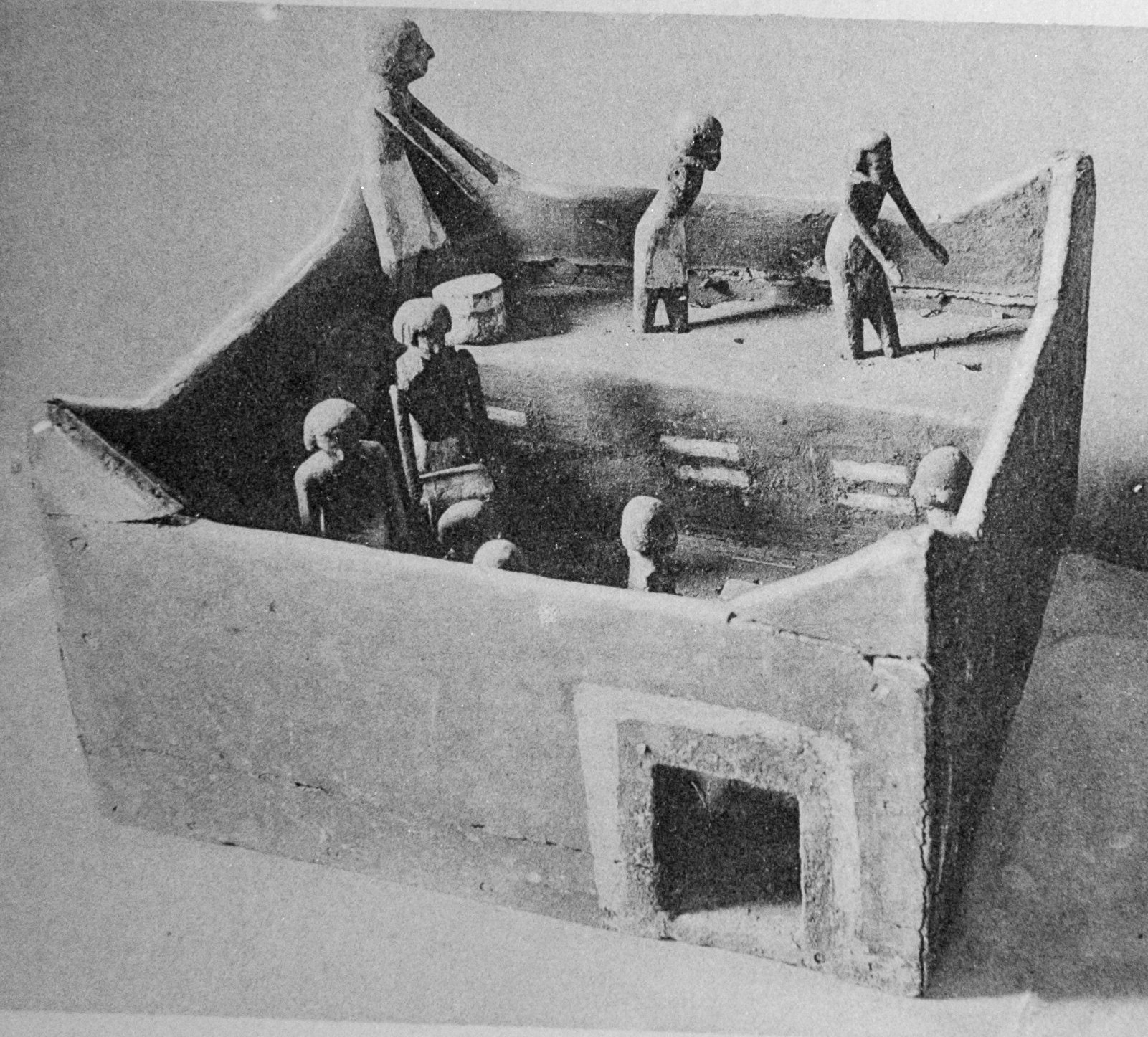
Model of granary from Mentuhotep II's tomb

Preceded by	King of Egypt c. 2040 - c. 2009 BC	Succeeded by Mentuhotep III
