= Eleventh Dynasty of Egypt family tree =

Family tree of ancient Egyptian rulers

The Eleventh Dynasty of Egypt conventionally starts with the Pharaoh Mentuhotep I and ends with the death of Mentuhotep IV, while the beginning of the Middle Kingdom is marked by the reunification of ancient Egypt under Mentuhotep II. As with many other dynasties, the 11th Dynasty family tree is partially unclear, with many obscure relationships, especially towards the end of the dynasty.

== Family tree ==
Iku (♀)
Intef the Elder
Mentuhotep I	Neferu I
Intef I	Intef II
Intef III	Iah
Neferu II	Tem	Mentuhotep II	Ashayet	Henhenet	Kawit	Kemsit	Sadeh
?? uncertain if Imi married Mentuhotep III
Mentuhotep III	(?) Imi
?? unknown relation to the other kings
Mentuhotep IV
