= Dynasties of ancient Egypt =

In ancient Egyptian history, dynasties are a series of rulers sharing a common origin. They are usually, but not always, traditionally divided into 33 pharaonic dynasties; these dynasties are commonly grouped by modern scholars into "kingdoms" and "intermediate periods".

The 31 dynastic divisions come from the 3rd century BC Egyptian priest Manetho, whose history Aegyptiaca was probably written for a Greek-speaking Ptolemaic ruler but survives only in fragments and summaries. While widely used and useful, the system does have its shortcomings. Some dynasties only ruled part of Egypt and existed concurrently with other dynasties based in other cities. Some dynasties like the Abydos Dynasty weren't counted; the 7th might not have existed at all, the 10th seems to be a continuation of the 9th, and there might have been one or several Egyptian dynasties before what is termed the 1st Dynasty.

== List of dynasties in ancient Egyptian history ==
Dates follow the timeline given by the University of Memphis, which is itself based on the work of Rolf Krauss. Figures have been deliberately rounded in order to avoid a misleading appearance of precision. See also the chronologies in Beckerath 1999, pp. 283–289, Bunson 2002, pp. 105–108, Shaw 2003, pp. 481–488, and Hornung, Krauss & Warburton 2006, pp. 490–495.

Dynasty	Seat	Period of rule	Term	First to rule	Last to rule	Number of rulers	List / Family tree
Early Dynastic Period (3000–2700 BC)
Dynasty I	Thinis	c. 3000–2800 BC	c. 170–300 years (Note: It is impossible to establish the exact chronology of the early dynasties. According to the most recent reconstruction of the Palermo Stone, the First Dynasty lasted a minimum of 150 years. Only the reigns of Aha and Narmer remain unspecified. While most authors give c. 3000 BC as the beginning of Dynastyc Egypt, radiocarbon dating studies yield earlier dates, possibly as early as c. 3200 BC. Following these studies, the First Dynasty may have lasted between 170 and 350 years. The Turin King List implies a start date c. 3100 BC.(± 150 years). Proposed dates: c. 3007–2828 (179 years), c. 2920–2770 (150 years), c. 3000–2750 (250 years), c. 3000–2890 (110 years), c. 2900–2730 (170 years))	Narmer	Qa'a	8	(list) (tree)
Dynasty II	Thinis	c. 2800–2675 BC	c. 100–200 years (Note: The chronology of the Second Dynasty is even more uncertain because Egypt was divided during most of its duration. The Turin King List does not acknowledge co-regencies for the Twelfth Dynasty, and thus likely did not for the Second Dynasty either. This must have resulted in an inflated total of years, meaning that the "955 years" given for the duration of the first eight dynasties must also be inflated. Proposed dates: c. 2828–2682 (146 years), c. 2770–2649 BC (121 years), c. 2750–2650 BC (100 years), c. 2890–2686 (204 years), c. 2730–2590 BC (140 years))	Hotepsekhemwy	Khasekhemwy	9 (?) (Note: As recorded in later Ramesside king lists. The actual number may be higher, as Egypt was divided and multiple kings ruled at the same time.)	(list)
Old Kingdom (2700–2200 BC)
Dynasty III	Memphis	c. 2675–2625 BC	c. 60 years (Note: According to radiocarbon dating, the Old Kingdom began sometime around the mid-27th century BC, possibly between 2676 and 2643 BC, but with more certainty between 2691 and 2625 BC. The dynasty ruled 74 years according to the Turin Canon, although the actual number could be as low as 50. Proposed dates: c. 2682–2614 BC (68 years), c. 2649–2575 BC (74 years), c. 2686–2600 BC (86 years), c. 2686–2613 BC (73 years), c. 2592–2544 BC (48 years))	Djoser	Huni	5	(list)
Dynasty IV	Memphis	c. 2625–2500 BC	c. 110 years (Note: The exact chronology of the Fourth Dynasty is heavily disputed, as scholars disagree whether cattle counts were made annually or biennially at this time. Proposed dates: c. 2614–2479 BC (135 years), c. 2575–2465 BC (110 years), c. 2600–2450 BC (150 years), c. 2613–2494 BC (119 years), c. 2543–2436 BC (107 years))	Sneferu	Shepseskaf (Note: The existence of Thamphthis is not archaeologically attested.)	6	(list) (tree)
Dynasty V	Memphis	c. 2500–2350 BC	c. 120–160 years (Note: Radiocarbon dating provides the accession of Userkaf in the range of 2548–2468 BC. Proposed dates: c. 2479–2322 BC (157 years), c. 2465–2323 BC (142 years), c. 2450–2300 BC (150 years), c. 2494–2345 BC (149 years), c. 2435–2306 BC (129 years))	Userkaf	Unas	9	(list) (tree)
Dynasty VI	Memphis	c. 2350–2170 BC	c. 160 years (Note: Radiocarbon dating provides the accession of Teti in the range of 2423–2335 BC. Proposed dates: c. 2322–2191 BC (131 years), c. 2323–2150 BC (173 years), c. 2300–2181 BC (150 years), c. 2345–2181 BC (164 years), c. 2305–2118 BC (187 years))	Teti	Nemtyemsaf II	6	(list) (tree)
First Intermediate Period (2200–2000 BC)
Dynasty VII / VIII (Note: The only historical account of Dynasty VII was found in Aegyptiaca by Manetho. Some historians consider Dynasty VII to be fictitious.)	Memphis	c. 2170–2130 BC	c. 30 years (Note: The Turin King List records a lacuna of 6 years in the summation of the Seventh Dynasty. This likely corresponds to the 10 additional rulers recorded only in the Abydos King List. This entire line of king is thought to have ruled for only one generation, or roughly 30 years.)	Netjerkare Siptah (Note: Netjerkare Siptah is sometimes listed as the last monarch of Dynasty VI, but only because some scholars equate him with the fictitious Queen Nitocris recorded by Manetho at the end of that dynasty.)	Neferirkare II	17	(list)
Dynasty IX / X (Note: Manetho records two Heracleopolitan dynasties of 19 kings each, which is almost certainly a copyist mistake. All evidence points to a single dynasty of 18 kings.)	Heracleopolis	c. 2130–1970 BC	c. 100 years (Note: It's impossible to determine the exact duration of the Heracleopolitan dynasty. Hornung simply rounds it to 100 years.)	Meryibre Khety I (Note: Most historians consider Meryibre Khety to be the founder of Dynasty IX, while others believe that Meryibre Khety reigned during Dynasty X)	Unknown	18	(list)
Middle Kingdom (2000–1800 BC)
Dynasty XI (Note: Dynasty XI before the reign of Mentuhotep II is typically classified as part of the First Intermediate Period of Egypt.)	Thebes	c. 2080–1940 BC	c. 143 years (Note: The Turin King List gives the total as 143 years, but it includes Mentuhotep I, who was likely a local ruler who was posthumously given royal status. The total thus may be a few years shorter.)	Mentuhotep I	Mentuhotep IV	7	(list) (tree)
Dynasty XII	Itjtawy (Note: Originally based at Thebes but move to Itjtawy during the 20th year of the reign of Amenemhat I)	c. 1940–1760 BC	c. 180 years (Note: The Turin Canon records the duration of the dynasty as 213 years, but this is the sum of all reigns without taking co-regencies into account. The correct number must be roughly 180.)	Amenemhat I	Sobekneferu	8	(list) (tree)
Second Intermediate Period (1800–1550 BC) (Note: The Turin King List records 51 kings for Dynasty XIII, but includes 17 damaged names and a sign for lacuna, which suggest that one or more names were lost. Dynasty XIV consists of another 51 kings, but 18 names are lost and there is another lacuna. Egyptologist have found at least 25 names for kings of this period, but their exact placement is unknown. This number is still lower than the aforementioned lost names in the Turin King List (35), which is itself incomplete.)
Dynasty XIII (Note: Some historians classify the earlier part of Dynasty XIII as part of the Middle Kingdom.)	Itjtawy (Note: Eventually moved to Thebes in 1677 BC)	c. 1760–1600 BC	c. 150 years (Note: Proposed dates: c. 1794/3–1648/5 (146/8 years), c. 1793/73–after 1650/40+ (120+ years), c. 1760–1630 BC (130 years), c. 1803–1649 BC (154 years))	Sobekhotep I	Unknown	57 (?) (Note: The Turin King List records at least 51 names, which Kim Ryholt rises to 57. However, two of his kings may be fictitious (see Sebkay).)	(list)
Dynasty XIV	Avaris (Note: according to Manetho the Fourteenth Dynasty was based at Xois however many modern scholars now believed that it was more likely based at Avaris)	uncertain	c. 150 years (Note: Shaw and Ryholt give the duration of Dynasty XIV as 123 years and 156 years, respectively. However, it is virtually impossible to establish correct dates given the lack of sources. The surviving content of the Turin King List shows that most rulers had brief reigns.)	Yakbim (Note: Some historians consider Yakbim Sekhaenre to be the founder of Dynasty XIV, while others believe Yakbim Sekhaenre reigned during Dynasty XVI.)	Unknown	56 (?) (Note: The Turin King List records at least 51 kings, which Ryholt rises to 56.)	(list)
Dynasty XV (Hyksos)	Avaris	c. 1630–1520 BC	c. 140 years (Note: The Turin King List gives a number that is often read as "108", but may also be "140".)	Salitis	Khamudi	6	(list)
Dynasty XVI	Thebes (Note: some scholars believe that the Sixteenth Dynasty were vassals of the Fifteenth Dynasty based at Avaris)	uncertain	c. 70 years (Note: This is the figure established by Shaw and Ryholt. Establishing a correct chronology is impossible because the 16th dynasty ruled alongside the 15th, which is itself difficult to date because it the date of their conquest of Lower Egypt is unknown.)	Unknown	Unknown	15	(list)
Abydos Dynasty (Note: The existence of the Abydos dynasty is debated. Ryholt postulates that the last kings in the Turin King List must belong to an obscure dynasty that ruled before the 17th, as the few surviving names do not match those of Dynasty XVII.)	Abydos	uncertain	uncertain	Unknown	Unknown	16 (?) (Note: The Turin King List ends at this point. It's possible that there were in fact more kings of this line.)	(list)
Dynasty XVII	Thebes	c. 1630–1540 BC	c. 90/30 years (Note: There is much uncertainty about the identity and correct placement of the rulers of Dynasty XVII. While older studies favor a duration of roughly 90 years, Ryholt and Hornung argue for a shorter period.)	Rahotep	Kamose	9 (?) (Note: As per the reconstruction of Kim Ryholt. Only the succession of the last three kings is confirmed by contemporary sources.)	(list) (tree)
New Kingdom (1550–1075 BC)
Dynasty XVIII	Thebes (Note: Briefly in Akhetaten.)	c. 1540–1292 BC	c. 250 years	Ahmose I	Horemheb	15 (Note: There is debate whether Smenkhkare and Neferneferuaten are one person or two distinct individuals.)	(list) (tree)
Dynasty XIX	Thebes (Note: Later Memphis and Pi-Ramesses.)	c. 1292–1190 BC	c. 102 years	Ramesses I	Tausret	8	(list) (tree)
Dynasty XX	Pi-Ramesses	c. 1190–1075 BC	c. 115 years	Setnakhte	Ramesses XI	10	(list) (tree)
Third Intermediate Period (1075–664 BC)
Dynasty XXI	Tanis	c. 1075–945 BC	c. 130 years	Smendes	Psusennes II	7	(list) (tree)
Priests of Amun (Note: The High Priests of Amun were the de facto rulers of Upper Egypt during the Twenty-first dynasty. A few even adopted pharaonic titles, thus becoming kings over their own domain.)	Thebes	c. 1060–990 BC	c. 85 years (Note: Intermittently. The High Priest of Amun, starting with Piankh, effectively ruled Upper Egypt for roughly 130 years.)	Herihor (de jure)	Menkheperre (de jure)	3	(list)
Dynasty XXII	Tanis/Bubastis	c. 945–712 BC	c. 230 years	Shoshenq I	Osorkon IV	11	(list) (tree)
Dynasty XXIII	Various (Note: The term "Dynasty XXIII" is used to group a series of rival lines that ruled contemporarily to Dynasty XXII.)	c. 838–712 BC	c. 120 years	Harsiese/Takelot II	Rudamun	20 (?) (Note: This is only the number of known kings. A possible additional ruler, Penamun, may have ruled around this time too.)	(list) (tree)
Dynasty XXIV	Sais	c. 727–712 BC	c. 10 years	Tefnakht	Bakenranef	2	(list) (tree)
Dynasty XXV (Nubian)	Memphis/Napata	c. 760–656	c. 100 years	Piye	Tantamani	5	(list) (tree)
Late Period (664–342 BC)
Dynasty XXVI	Sais	c. 664–525 BC	c. 139 years	Psamtik I	Psamtik III	6	(list) (tree)
Dynasty XXVII (Persian)	Babylon	c. 525–404 BC	c. 121 years	Cambyses II	Darius II	8	(list) (tree)
Dynasty XXVIII	Sais	c. 404–399 BC	c. 6 years	Amyrtaeus	Amyrtaeus	1	(list)
Dynasty XXIX	Mendes	c. 399–380 BC	c. 19 years	Nepherites I	Nepherites II	4	(list)
Dynasty XXX	Sebennytos	c. 380–342 BC	c. 38 years	Nectanebo I	Nectanebo II	3	(list) (tree)
Dynasty XXXI (Persian)	Babylon	c. 342–332 BC	c. 10 years	Artaxerxes III	Darius III	3	(list) (tree)
Hellenistic period (342–30 BC)
Dynasty XXXII/Argead (Greek)	Pella (Note: The capital of Macedonia during its rule over Egypt was Pella. The Egyptian administrative center during this period was Alexandria.)	c. 332–305 BC	c. 27 years	Alexander III	Alexander IV	3	(list) (tree)
Dynasty XXXIII/Ptolemaic (Greek)	Alexandria	c. 305–30 BC	c. 275 years	Ptolemy I	Cleopatra VII (de facto); Caesarion (de jure)	22 (Note: The Ptolemaic dynasty may have had an additional ruler, Cleopatra VI, although she is most likely the same person as Cleopatra V.)	(list) (tree)
Egypt was incorporated into the Roman Republic on 31 August 30 BC. (see Roman Egypt, Roman pharaoh and List of Roman dynasties)

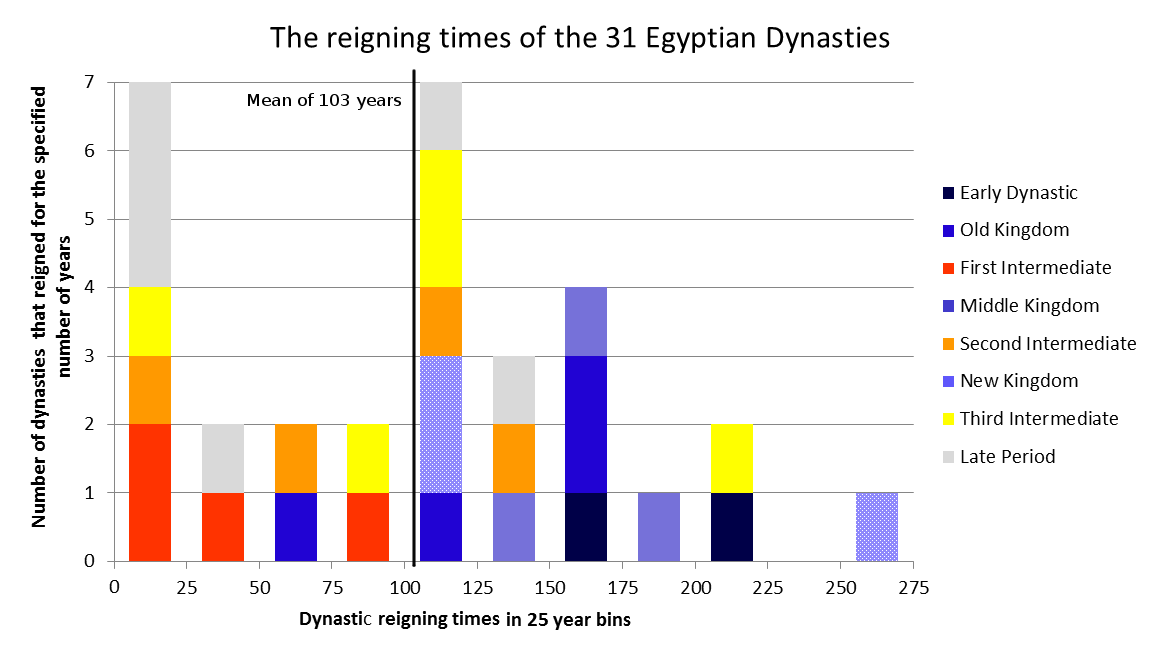
The 31 pre-Ptolemaic dynasties by the length of their rule (in 25-year bins), (Note: Starting on the far right of this chart, only one dynasty lasted over 250 years (18th dynasty). Two dynasties lasted between 200 and 225 years (two boxes). One dynasty lasted between 175 and 200 years (one box), etc.) each dynasty being a coloured box. The early dynasties and the three Kingdoms are blue, with darker colours meaning older. Intermediate periods are red, orange, and yellow. Note that multiple dynasties could reign from different cities simultaneously in intermediate periods and at the end of the Middle Kingdom. Dynastic reigning times are often very approximate; the above uses the dates of the Egyptian dynasty list template.

== See also ==
- List of pharaohs
- Egyptian chronology
- List of rulers of Medieval Egypt
