= Wadi el-Hudi =

Archaeological site in Egypt

Coordinates: 23.9615°N 33.1313°E

Wadi el-Hudi is a mining region that includes a large wadi and a mountain named Gebel el-Hudi in the Egyptian Eastern Desert, Southeast of Aswan. The name hudi is thought to come from the Arabic word for guide. Wadi el-Hudi is geologically rich and has been the basis of considerable mining and study since Ancient times. While it was initially known for the ancient amethyst quarries, this area is important to the study of Egyptian archaeology and history because of its high number of rock inscriptions, stele, settlements, and mines, mainly dating to the Middle Kingdom. This area is fairly large, about 100 square kilometers.

== Geology ==
This region was the primary source of amethyst in Ancient Egypt. This region's geology is quite diverse and rare due to the meeting of Precambrian basement of metamorphic gneiss with the younger Cretaceous Nubian sandstone. Based on the compositions of the country rock, quartz, amethyst, and gold are abundantly found here. Other minerals have been found, such as amazonite, copper, carnelian, talc, barite, and galena. Diorite hammerstones of natural, local origin are found everywhere in this region.

== History ==
There is evidence of human activity from the Paleolithic, Nagada II/ Predynastic, Middle Kingdom, New Kingdom, Ptolemaic, Persian, and Islamic eras. Travelers most likely used the region throughout every era, and in modern times. Rock art from pastoral nomads may have begun as early as the predynastic era, as the region was used by multiple groups of travelers. Organized, state- sponsored campaigns to mine amethyst began in the 11th dynasty under the reign of Mentuhotep IV. Later, these expeditions were expanded by the 12th dynasty king, Senwosret I. Inscriptions range through the Middle Kingdom, until the reign of Sobekhotep IV.

Egyptian administrative officials still knew of this region during the New Kingdom. During the Persian period, small groups of miners worked at Site 11 and left graffiti on WH143. Later in the Ptolemaic period, large expeditions returned to mine amethyst at Site 4. During the 9th-10c. CE, large groups mined gold at Sites 3 and 13. Currently, the Eastern Desert as a region is being exploited for resources by both legal and illegal mining groups.

== Sites ==
As of 2023, 58 sites have been found, but more are being found every year.

=== Settlements with mines ===
==== 1 ====
Site 1 is several long, thin mine shafts and huts that is located northeast of the main wadi. Site 1 has evidence of mining activity from multiple periods, including the Middle Kingdom, as well as lots of evidence for Paleolithic stone tools. A stele (WH 14) was found here, dating to the 12th Dynasty.

==== 2 ====
Site 2 contains a fortified settlement, possibly dating to the Ptolemaic period, found just northeast of Gebel el-Hudi. This site also has considerable Paleolithic evidence as well.

This site is currently being turned into a 3-D model.

==== 3 ====
Site 3 is a small gold mine with work areas and several huts, west of Gebel el-Hudi. This site was used in the Islamic Period. There is small scale, but sustained gold mining that spanned multiple years.

==== 4 ====
Site 4 is an amethyst mine and the remains of a fortified settlement that was built during the Middle Kingdom and renovated during the Ptolemaic period. In the Middle Kingdom, Site 4 was a third large settlement to be built by the Egyptian government at Wadi el-Hudi. This area was frequently used during Middle Kingdom by state-sponsored mining expeditions. Stele found at this Site relate to the social history, religious history, and administration of the mines. The structures are similar in design to Lower Nubian fortresses. Some amethyst veins are still visible in the mine, but most are faded or milky from the sun exposure. This Site is more remote than others in the area, being protected on all sides by the terrain.

Site 4 also hosts the only New Kingdom artifact found so far, a stele from the reign of Amenhotep II, known as the Usersatet Stele.

During the Ptolemaic period, large expeditions reopened the mine. At this point, the settlements were renovated, reusing Middle Kingdom stele and buildings.

Site 4 is currently being turned into a 3-D model.

==== 5 and 36 ====
Site 5 is a large amethyst mine and settlement built onto the terrain of a hill. Site 5 features a large, winding set of natural paths and stairs that walk through communal areas into private, administrative areas. This Site was the first settlement to be built by the Egyptian government during the reign of Mentuhotep IV. The geography of this Site allows people to see into the surrounding wadi, or valley. Around the boulders at Site 5 there are more than 100 rock carvings. Rock inscriptions at this site were used to communicate with soldiers and workers, and commemorate the mission.

According to inscription WH 6, Middle Kingdom mining expeditions of over 1500 people frequently used this Site. Both Site 5 and Site 9 demonstrate that Nubians were a significant part of the workforce. The construction of this Site is similar to Wadi es-Sebua. Paleolithic stone tools have been found at Site 5.

Site 36 consists of around 20 piles of stacked stones directly adjacent to the Site 5 settlement, and was probably created by the same people. Excavations of these piles of stones have shown that they are just cairns, with no evidence of burials.

Sites 5 and 36 are currently being turned into a 3-D model.

==== 7 and 45 ====
Sites 7 and 45 are parts of an ancient road that goes between Wadi el-Hudi and Aswan.

==== 9 and 15 ====
Site 9 is a large amethyst mine and rectangular Middle Kingdom settlement built in the sandy wadi bed. Site 15 is a rock nearby where stele were erected. Site 9 and the nearby Site 15 were built second, likely during the reign of Senusret I. Site 9's structure was built in at least two phases. It is made up of a storage area, administrative area, work areas, and open courts. This structure has architecture similar to other Middle Kingdom, such as Buhen and Mirgissa. However, the construction of the walls is similar to Nubian architecture, such as that found at Wadi es-Sebua. The walls of the Site are between 1 and 2 meters high, which was the original building height. The structure has small windows along exterior walls. The large, open pit mine butts up against the eastern walls of the structure. Multiple heaps of rocks have been found nearby, most likely used in the mining process.

Mining in this area began during the reign of Senusret I, and continued through the 13th dynasty. This area, and others, were frequently used during Middle Kingdom mining expeditions of over 1500 people. This site was built by Nubian workers following Egyptian building plans. Because of the distance of from the Nile, local rocks were used instead of mudbrick.

Both Site 5 and Site 9 demonstrate that Nubians were a significant part of the workforce.

This site is currently being turned into a 3-D model.

==== 11 and 12 ====
Site 11 and Site 12 were used during the Persian era. Site 11 is a hilltop settlement. Site 12 is the mine further down the hill.

==== 13 and 14 ====
Site 14 is an ancient and modern gold mine. Site 13 is a settlement where the ore was processed. These Sites are a mile long mine that was most actively used in the 9th and 10th century. These sites were initially used during the Persian Period, but continued to be used through the Ottoman Era and through today. These Sites also has considerable Paleolithic evidence as well.

==== 21 ====
Site 21 is a small amethyst mine with 13 related huts or windbreaks nearby. This Site has a rocky outcropping at the bottom of a small valley, with no shade and rocky paths. Unlike other Sites, this was not connected to mining activity run by the Egyptian State. Some areas were used for cooking, processing amethyst, storing food, and managing refuse. Desert Nubians likely mined amethyst here, based on the pottery remains found at feature 11, a hut and amethyst processing area. Site 21 was mined at approximately the same time as the Egyptian state was pursuing large-scale mining nearby.

==== 22 ====
Site 22 includes a hut, some natural stone features, and a small mine that was used to look for veins of amethyst, but never yielded great spoils.

=== Prospect mines ===
==== 8, 19, 25, 26 ====
These Sites are small mines that were either prospections or abandoned after not yielding much. Because they were used for a short time, most of these mines have very little evidence for the people that created them.

==== 20 ====
Site 20 is a small prospect mine. It was possibly started in the Roman period, as dated by the pottery remains.

==== 54 ====
This prospect mine includes some pottery fragments that are likely handmade Nubian.

=== Other sites ===
==== 6 and 27 ====
Site 6 and Site 27 are rocky hilltop areas used for surveillance. They were part of a surveillance network that oversaw the larger landscape. Site 6 contains more than 60 inscriptions of soldiers, their titles, and their dogs and was the central point of the surveillance network. Several hundred years prior to the soldiers inscribing these rocks, pastoral nomads first drew images of themselves and their animals, including cows on this pinnacle.

Site 6 is currently being turned into a 3-D model.

Site 27 is a small node in this surveillance network, made up of a small hut and one inscription of a soldier.

==== 42, 43, 52 ====
These Sites may contain small burials. Some burials are of single individuals; most likely travelers who did not survive their trek. Burials of multiple individuals close together may indicate a pastoral nomadic family burial area that was reused when needed. These most likely date to the Nagada II/ A-Group period and include mixed pottery traditions.

==== 51 ====
Site 51 is a natural rock shelter used as a short term living space. This Site is about a day's walk from the Nile, and may have held water from an occasional rain event. It was described by a traveler, Hansjoachim Van der Esch, in 1938, but had been used for millennia before. Pottery from this area indicates it was used by Nubian pastoral nomads and travelers from many eras. Based on pottery remains, the Site was used heavily in the Roman and Islamic periods.

Some people used this Site for just a night or for temporary shelter, while others most likely lived here for longer amounts of time. Tally marks in the walls indicate several multi-week stays. Some inscriptions are of local animals, and some are figural, while others are text. An inscription on a rock overhang reads: "Hotepi discovered this place". This dates to the possibly the Old Kingdom or First Intermediate Period.

There are dozens of grinding stones and slicks here that indicate pastoral nomads sheltered here and processed plants they have gathered.

== Inscriptions ==
The inscriptions at Wadi el-Hudi cover a range of thousands of years, including predynastic rock art, Middle Kingdom inscriptions, Persian graffiti, Ptolemaic ostraca, and Arabic graffiti. 40 stele were brought from the Sites to be housed in the Aswan museum and Egyptian museum in the 1930s and 1940s. Currently, the Wadi el-Hudi Expedition has found over 300 inscriptions, and 155 had been previously published by Ahmed Fakhry and Ashraf Sadek.

=== WH 4 ===
This inscription on a boulder at Site 5 describes the work that was done there during the first mining season in the Middle Kingdom. Line 14 states "what was gotten as amethyst: 150 hekat", which is about 680 liters, or enough to fill a pantry. This inscription also discusses Nubian workers at Wadi el-Hudi. WH 4 dates to the 11th Dynasty, during the first year of the reign of Mentuhotep IV.

=== WH 6 ===
This stela notes that over 1500 people from all over Egypt were working at Wadi el-Hudi during the reign of Senwoseret I. The accounting includes 1000 laborers, 300 soldiers, administrators and mining specialists. This is probably an accounting of all the people and supply lines that supported the expedition.

=== WH 22 and WH 23 ===
These sandstone stele are from Site 4. They are a royal inscription that mention a temple to Hathor, Lady of Amethyst and Satet, Lady of Elephantine, as well as enumerating others who participated in these larger expeditions. These date to year 6 of the reign of Sobekhotep IV. They were restored by the Wadi el-Hudi Expedition with the help of Antiquities Endowment Fund via the American Research Center in Egypt.

=== WH 143 ===
Wadi el Hudi, Stele of Hor

This stele, also known as the Stele of the steward (imy-r pr) Hor, praises king Senwosret I, and mentions the Nubians workers at the camp. This stele also uses the phrase "beautiful is he in the desert", which refers to the region, but may also be the name of Site 9. The mention of Nubian workers is of note, as it sparks further discussion regarding the degree of autonomy these workers had.

=== WH 156 ===
This Middle Kingdom stele likely comes from Wadi el-Hudi. It discusses the distribution of water in the desert as an important rite: I gave water to every thirsty man who was on this mountain/ desert while I was performing rituals in the temple.

=== WH 254 ===
This is a black granite stele found at Site 4. The text on this stele is still being translated, but the central part had been reused as a grinding stone, making translations difficult.

=== WH 255 / Usersatet ===
The Stele of Usersatet was found at Site 4, and is the only surviving New Kingdom artifact from the region found so far. It dates to the reign of Amenhotep II, and was commissioned by Usersatet, the Viceroy of Kush, also called the King's son of Kush. He is giving offerings to two goddesses, Satet and Hathor. Usersatet dedicated the stele here, even though the amethyst mine was not currently open, and had not been for 300 years. After this monument was erected, someone else came back to Wadi el-Hudi to erase his image.

=== WH 272 ===
This red granite stele, found at Site 4, may include a biographical text. It was recently shattered, making translations difficult. It is being reconstructed.

== Peoples in Wadi el-Hudi ==
=== Paleolithic peoples ===
Recent evidence shows that people from the Middle Stone age may have lived at Wadi el-Hudi.

=== Pastoral nomads ===
Groups of nomadic people were present at Wadi el-Hudi before, during, and after the state- sponsored mining activities. Sites 42, 43 and 51 indicate that pastoral nomadic groups stopped at natural rock shelters. They most likely kept their herds nearby. Some groups kept track of time spent at the Sites with markings on rocks. Text evidence of Egyptian records in the Nile Valley record several groups, like the Medjay, Nehesy, and Iwntyw should be in this area. However, textual references from Sites 5, 6 and 9 at Wadi el-Hudi only mention the Iwntyw, Nehesy, and Ta-Seti. Many groups also practiced semi-nomadic pastoralism, meaning they migrated in seasonal patterns and cultivated some local plants.

=== Travelers ===
The main valley of Wadi el-Hudi is part of a major desert route between the Nile Valley and the Red Sea or Sudan. Ancient roads have been used for at least 7000 years, as well as well into the modern era. Sites 13 and 51 are shelters that were used by people traveling through the area. Cairns that are still present guided travelers along the wadi. Evidence of camel caravans still exist.

=== Large expeditions ===
The Egyptian State-sponsored expeditions used laborers, administrator, soldiers, and specialists for the mining supply and process. Most of these workers were Egyptians, but some Nubians participated in both the construction of the Sites and the mining process. This indicates that this area was fairly multi-cultural, with groups interacting and working together in different areas. One account records over 1500 people working at Wadi el-Hudi, but that number likely includes the running and supply of multiple Sites by many types of personnel. These expeditions were highly organized and planned before mining began. Small prospector groups started by searching for amethyst, then brought larger groups to continue the work. Animal bones found at the site show that the workers ate salted fish, sheep, and cow that was imported from the Nile Valley.

=== Small expeditions ===
Some groups began starter or prospector mines, such as those found at Site 21. These weren't connected to larger mining activities, but might have run concurrently to the large expeditions.

== History of research ==
=== Labib Nasim ===
Labib Nasim was an Egyptian geologist who visited the region for a geological study. Some evidence indicates Labib Nasim and his daughter visited in 1917. His daughter, Gertrude Nasim, went on to study geology and became one of the first Egyptian women to obtain a PhD in sciences.

=== George Murray ===
George W Murray was a surveyor for the British government during the 1920s and 1930s. His book, Dare me to the Desert, was published in 1967 and describes several regions of the Eastern Desert, including Wadi el-Hudi. After reports that inscriptions were being taken from Wadi el-Hudi and sold, he and his colleagues informed the Antiquities Service to protect the inscriptions at Wadi el-Hudi. Forty inscriptions were stored at the Aswan Museum and the Egyptian Museum.

=== Hansjoachim von der Esch ===
This German bureaucrat traveled around the Wadi el-Hudi region in 1938. He took photos of Sites 13, and the later named Site 51 that were published in 1941. He and his Bishareen guides took refuge from a sand storm at Site 51 and photographed multiple inscriptions.

=== Ahmed Fakhry ===
Ahmed Fakhry was an Egyptian Egyptologist and Inspector that surveyed the region starting in 1944. He and his colleagues also visited in 1946 and 1949, and created the original map of the region. It is his numbering system that is used to demarcate the Sites (1-14, then continued on by the Wadi el-Hudi Expedition). His book, The Inscriptions of the Amethyst Quarries at Wadi el-Hudi, was an early publication on the inscriptions and the archaeology.

=== Ashraf Sadek ===
Ashraf Sadek published translations of the inscriptions first recorded by Ahmed Fakhry in 1980. 40 of these inscriptions were previously moved to Aswan. He made translations of these stele more accessible to a broader audience.

=== Ian Shaw and Robert Jameson ===
These scholars visited in 1992 and surveyed the archaeology at Wadi el-Hudi. Their biggest contribution to research in this area was changing the focus from the inscriptions to the people who created them and the workers of the mine itself.

=== Rosemarie and Dietrich Klemm ===
In 1993 The Klemms visited and published on the geoarchaeology of the area, focusing on ancient gold mines at Sites 3 and 14. They later published Gold and Gold Mining in Ancient Egypt and Nubia. This publication sparked recent gold and other mineral mining in the region by multiple companies.

=== Wadi el-Hudi Expedition ===
Since 2014 the Wadi el-Hudi Expedition has been further studying the archaeology of the region. Using modern technological advancements such as 3-D modeling and RTI, the team has been able to uncover further information that was previously unknown. The team is led by Dr. Kate Liszka, Dr. Meredith Brand, and Bryan Kraemer.

== Adjacent sites ==
=== Dihmit and el-Hisnein ===
Dihmit North and South, and el-Hisnein East and West are regions close to the main Wadi el-Hudi archaeological Sites. They are similar Middle Kingdom fortified mining settlements.

These sites have several archeological features that are currently being studied by the Wadi el-Hudi Expedition. Dihmit South was associated with amethyst mining. This was likely the center of a larger community, based on the paths around the area.

Some areas of el-Hisnein and Dihmit North have been destroyed by illegal mining as recently as 2013.

== See also ==
- Ahmed Fakhry
- Ian Shaw
- Dihmit South
- Arabian-Nubian Shield

== Bibliography ==
Kate Liszka, Bryan Kraemer, Amy Wilson, and Ariel Singer. 2026. “Tales from the Land of Amethyst: Part 2” in Scribe 17, spring.

Wilson, A., Kraemer, B., & Liszka, K. 2025. Stela of the Viceroy Usersatet from Wadi el-Hudi (WH 255). Journal of the American Research Center in Egypt, 61(1), 195–218.

Kate Liszka and Bryan Kraemer. 2024. “Tales from the Land of Amethyst: Reconstructing Stories from Stelae at Wadi el-Hudi.” in Scribe 14, fall, 18-28.

Liszka, Kate. 2024. “Evidence for Pastoral Nomads and Travelers in the Eastern Desert: Site 51 and Beyond at Wadi el-Hudi, Egypt.” In Near Eastern Archaeology.

Brand, Meredith and Kate Liszka. 2023. “A desert Middle Nubian amethyst mining camp at Wadi el-Hudi.” In Sudan & Nubia 27: 24-47.

Brand, Meredith, Bryan Kraemer, and Kate Liszka. 2022. “Living and Working at the early Middle Kingdom Amethyst Mining Settlement Site 5, Wadi el-Hudi.” In Daily Life of Ancient Egyptian Settlements, ed. Johanna Sigl. SDAIK 47, Otto Harrassowitz, 41-55.

Berkiten, Sema, Xinyi Fan, and Szymon Rusinkiewicz. 2015. “Semi-Automatic Digital Epigraphy from Images with Normals,” In Non-Photorealistic Animation and Rendering, edited by D. Mould and P. Bénard, 1-13.

Brand, Meredith. 2019. “Early Middle Kingdom Nubian Imitation Wares at Wadi el-Hudi.” In Cahiers de la Céramique Égyptienne 11 “Céramiques égyptiennes au Soudan ancien : Importations, imitations et influences”, Romain David (ed.). p.29-46.

Storemyr, Per. 2018. “Wadi el-Hudi, Aswan, Egypt: Geoarchaeology of Site 9 and environs. Amethyst mining in the Middle Kingdom.”

Liszka, Kate. 2018. “Site 4 at Wadi el-Hudi: A Lost Amethyst Mining Settlement.” In Egyptian Archaeology 51: 36-40.

Liszka, Kate 2017. “Egyptian or Nubian?: Settlement Architecture at Wadi el-Hudi, Wadi es-Sebua, and the Eastern Desert” In Journal of Egyptian Archaeology 103: 35-51.

Liszka, Kate. 2017. “Salvaging and Protecting the Archaeology of Wadi el-Hudi, Eastern Desert.” Bulletin of the American Research Center in Egypt 210: 16-21.

Liszka, Kate. 2015. “Gems in the Desert: Recent Work at Wadi el-Hudi.” Egyptian Archaeology 46: 37-40.

Espinel, Andrés. “A Newly Identified Stela from Wadi el-Hudi (Cairo JE 86119).” Journal of Egyptian Archaeology 91 (2005): 55-70.

Fakhry, Ahmed. The Inscriptions of the Amethyst Quarries at Wadi El Hudi. The Egyptian Deserts. Cairo: Government Press, 1952.

González-Tablas Nieto, Javier. “La Explotación Minera de Wadi el-Hudi bajo el reinado de Senusert I.” Studia historica. Historia antigua 27 (2009): 149-161.

Harrell, James A. and Robert E. Mittelstaedt. “Newly Discovered Middle Kingdom Forts in Lower Nubia.” Sudan & Nubia 19 (2015): 30-39.

Klemm, Rosemarie, Dietrich D. Klemm, and Andreaes Murr. “Geo-archäologischer Survey im Wadi el-Hudi.” In Festschrift Arne Eggbrecht, 53-66. Hildesheim: Gerstenberg Verlag.

Obsomer, Claude. Sésostris Ier: Etud chronologique et historique du règne. Brussels: Connaissance de l’Égypte Ancienne, 1995.

Rowe, Alan. “Three Stelae from the South-Eastern Desert,” Annales du Service des antiquités de l’Egypte 39 (1939): 187-194.

Sadek, Ashraf I. The Amethyst Mining Inscriptions of Wadi El-Hudi. Warminster: Aris & Phillips, 1980.

Seyfried, Karl-Joachim. Beiträge zu den Expeditionen des Mittleren Reiches in die Ost-Wüste. Hildesheim: Gerstenberg Verlag. 1981.

Seyfried, Karl-Joachim. “Zur Inschrift des Hor (Wadi el Hudi Nr. I (143)),” Göttinger Miszellen 81 (1984): 55-66.

Shaw, Ian. “Surveying at the Edges of Egypt: The Archaeology of Pharaonic Mining and Quarrying,” Bulletin of the Australian Centre for Egyptology 4 (1993): 51-54.

Shaw, Ian. “Pharaonic Quarrying and Mining: Settlement and Procurement in Egypt’s Marginal Regions.” Antiquity 68:258 (1994): 108-19.

Shaw, Ian. “Exploiting the Desert Frontier: The Logistics and Politics of Ancient Egyptian Mining Expeditions,” In Social Approaches to the Industrial Past: The Archaeology and Anthropology of Mining, edited by Knapp, Pigott, and Herbert, 242-258, London: Routledge. 1998.

Shaw, Ian. “The Evidence for Amethyst Mining in Nubia and Egypt,” In Recent Research into the Stone Age of Northeastern Africa, edited by Zrzyzaniak, Kroeper, and Kobusiewicz, 219-227, Poland: Poznań Archaeological Museum. 2000.

Shaw, Ian. “Life on the Edge: Gemstones, Politics and Stress in the Deserts of Egypt and Nubia,” In Egypt and Nubia: Gifts of the Desert, edited by Renée Friedman, 244-251, London: The British Museum Press. 2002.

Shaw, Ian. “Late Roman Amethyst and Gold Mining at Wadi el-Hudi,” In Egyptian Stories: A British Egyptological Tribute to Alan B. Lloyd on the Occasion of His Retirement, edited by Schneider and Szpakowska, 319-328, Münster: Ugarit-Verlag, 2007.

Shaw, Ian, and Robert Jameson. “Amethyst Mining in the Eastern Desert: A Preliminary Survey at Wadi El-Hudi.” Journal of Egyptian Archaeology 79 (1993): 81-97.

Sidebotham, Steven, Martin Hense, and Hendrikje Nouwens, The Red Land. Cairo: The American University in Cairo Press, 2008.
