= TT308 =

Theban tomb

Theban tomb TT308
- Burial site of Kemsit
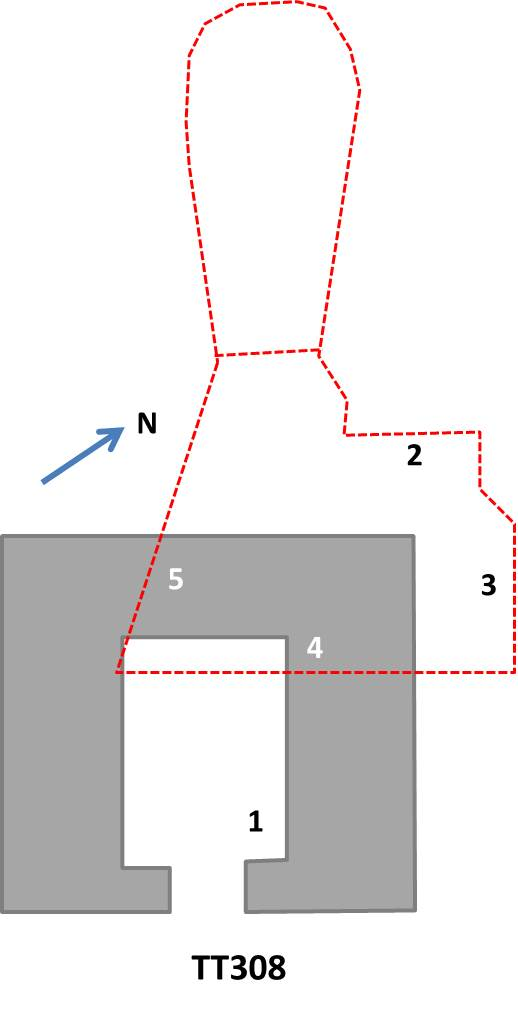

- Location within Egypt
- Location: Deir el-Bahari, Theban Necropolis
- Excavated by: Discovered by Naville
- ← Previous; TT307 Next → TT309

The Theban Tomb known as TT308 is located in Deir el-Bahari. It forms part of the Theban Necropolis, situated on the west bank of the Nile opposite Luxor. The tomb is the burial place of the Ancient Egyptian Kemsit, who was King's Beloved Wife, King's Ornament, King's Sole Ornament, Priestess of Hathor during the reign of Mentuhotep II, in the 11th dynasty.

== See also ==
- List of Theban tombs
