= Nehi (Viceroy of Kush) =

Ancient Egyptian official

- Viceroy of Kush
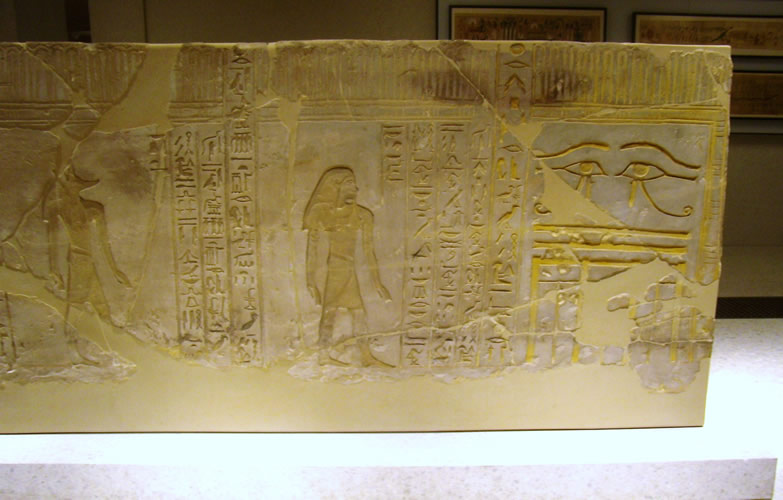
- the sarcophagus of Nehy
Egyptian name
nH H Z4 A52
- Predecessor: Inebny/Amenemnekhu
- Successor: Usersatet
- Dynasty: 18th Dynasty
- Pharaoh: Thutmose III

Nehi (or Nehy) was an Ancient Egyptian official with the titles of a viceroy of Kush – the governor of the Nubian provinces which were under Egyptian control. Nehy was in office under Thutmose III. In the 23rd year of Thutmose III he followed the king on his campaign to Syria. There are several inscriptions of Nehy found in Nubia, attesting building activity at several places. Nehy was buried at Thebes although the exact location of his tomb is lost. However, in the Egyptian Museum of Berlin is preserved his monumental sarcophagus made of limestone. Sarcophagi for officials are rare in this period providing evidence for the high social status of Nehy in his time.

== Literature ==
- Christian Leblanc: Nehy, prince et premiere rapporteur du roi, In: Isabelle Regen, Frédéric Servajan (Hrsg): Verba manent, Recueil d'etudes dédiées à Dimitri Meeks par ses collègues et amis. Montpellier 2009 (Cahiers Égypte Nilotique et Méditerranéenne. 2. ISSN 2102-6637), S. 241-251.
- Labib Habachi, in: Lexikon der Ägyptologie III, Wiesbaden 1980, page 631-32 ISBN 3-447-02100-4
