= Ian Shaw (Egyptologist) =

British Egyptologist (born 1961)

Ian Shaw (born 1961) is a British academic and Egyptologist, who earned his PhD from the University of Cambridge and became a Reader in Egyptian Archaeology at the University of Liverpool. He directs several archaeological projects in Egypt.

== Life ==
His field work originally focused on el-Amarna, but since then, he has extensively surveyed, excavated, and studied mining and quarrying sites from various Ancient Egyptian periods, those include Wadi el-Hudi, Gebel el-Asr, Hatnub, Wadi Hammamat, among others.

He is a social historian and archaeologist. His work focuses on methods and mechanics of Egyptian craftsmen and laborers. Additionally, he has studied ancient Egyptian warfare, mining, industry, technology, and much more.

Besides writing several books, he has also edited major volumes related to Ancient Egypt, including Ancient Egyptian Materials and Industries, the Oxford History of Ancient Egypt, several Dictionaries of Ancient Egypt, and the Oxford Handbook of Egyptology.

On 15 March 2018, Shaw was elected a Fellow of the Society of Antiquaries (FSA).

== Bibliography ==
  - Egyptian Warfare and Weapons, 1991
  - The British Museum Dictionary of Ancient Egypt, 1995 (With Paul Nicholson)
  - The Blackwell Dictionary of Archaeology (Editor, with R. Jameson), 1999
  - The Oxford History of Ancient Egypt, 2000 (Editor)
  - Ancient Egyptian Materials and Technology, 2000 (Editor with Paul Nicholson)
  - Hatnub: Quarrying Travertine in Ancient Egypt, 2010
  - Ancient Egyptian Technology and Innovation, 2012
  - Ancient Egyptian Warfare, 2019
  - The Oxford Handbook of Egyptology, 2020 (Editor with Elizabeth Bloxam)
  - Ancient Egypt: A Very Short Introduction, 2nd edition 2021

== See also ==
- List of Egyptologists
- Wadi Hammamat https://www.wadi-hammamat-project.co.uk/
