= Ashayet =

Egyptian queen consort

aA a A S i i t
- King's Beloved Wife; King's Sole Ornament; Priestess of Hathor
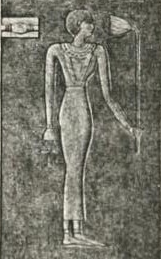

Queen consort of Egypt
- Tenure: c. 2025 BC
- King: Mentuhotep II
- Burial: Deir el-Bahari, Luxor, Egypt
- Spouse: Mentuhotep II
- Dynasty: 11th Dynasty of Egypt

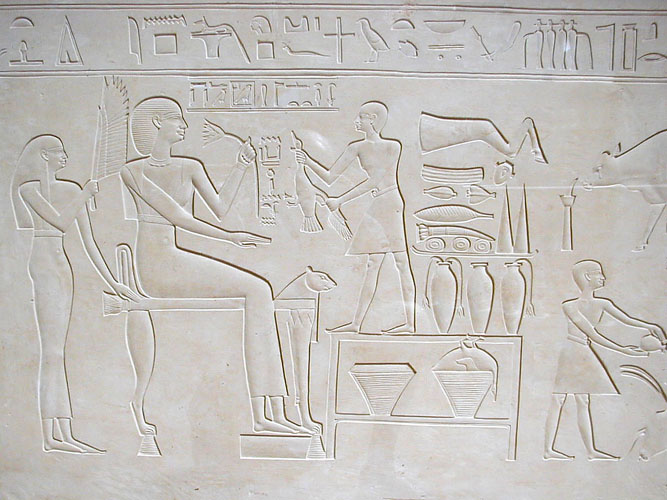
Relief of Ashayet from her limestone sarcophagus

Ashayet or Ashait (fl. c. 2025 BC) was an ancient Egyptian queen consort, a wife of Mentuhotep II in the 11th Dynasty. Her tomb (DBXI.17) and small decorated chapel were found in Mentuhotep II's Deir el-Bahari temple complex. The shrine and burial of Ashayet was found along with the tombs of four other women in their 20s, Henhenet, Kawit, Kemsit, Sadeh, and a young girl, Mayet. However, it is likely that there were three other additional shrines that were destroyed in the expansions of Mentuhotep II's burial complex. The nine shrines were built in the First Intermediate Period, prior to Mentuhotep II's reunification of Egypt. She and three other women of the six bore queenly titles, and most of them were Priestesses of Hathor. The location of their burial is significant to their titles as Priestesses of Hathor as the cliffs of Deir el-Bahri were sacred to Hathor from the Old Kingdom onwards.

Her titles were: King's Beloved Wife (ḥmt-nỉswt mrỉỉ.t=f ), King's Sole Ornament (ẖkr.t-nỉswt wˁtỉ.t), Priestess of Hathor (ḥm.t-nṯr ḥwt-ḥrw), Priestess of Hathor, great of kas, foremost in her places (ḥm.t-nṯr ḥwt-ḥrw wr.t m [k3.w]=s ḫntỉ.t m swt=s), Priestess of Hathor, great of kas, foremost in her places, Lady of Dendera (ḥm.t-nṯr ḥwt-ḥrw nb.t ỉwn.t wr.t k3.w=s ḫntỉ.t m swt=s).

Ashayet's stone sarcophagus (JE 47267) contained a wooden coffin (JE 47355) and a wooden statue was also located in the tomb; they are now in the Egyptian Museum in Cairo. Her stone sarcophagus is particularly well known for the exterior relief and painted interior. The painted interior was copied as tempera on paper facsimiles by Charles K. Wilkinson in Gurna in 1926. The facsimiles are now found in the Metropolitan Museum of Art, New York, but were never published. In the interior decoration of two Medjay women, Federtyt and Mekhenet, are depicted and named as part of Ashayet's household. Depictions of her three female scribes were named and depicted in same publisher. Liszka interprets this as this elite woman was in charge of her own household and choices of commissioned art for her depiction of afterlife. It has been posited that Ashayet herself was a Nubian elite woman living as queen in Egypt.

== Facsimiles of Aashyt's sarcophagus ==
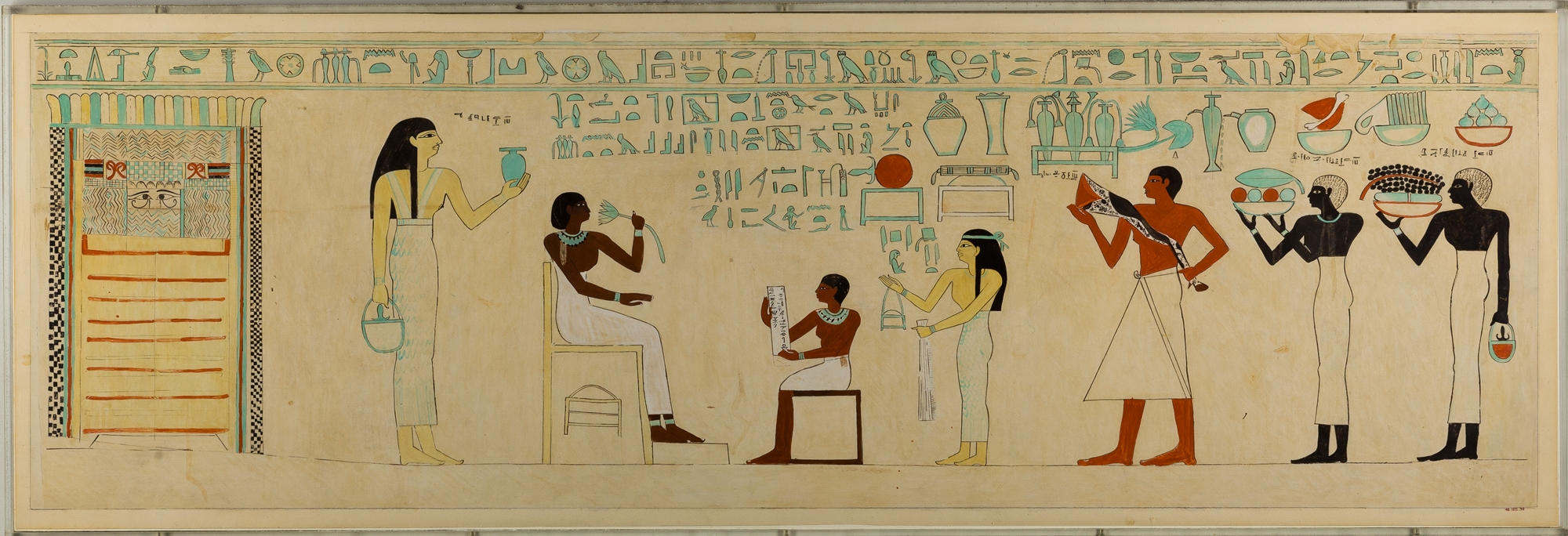
Facsimile painting on the sarcophagus of Queen Ashayet, smelling the sacred blue lotus

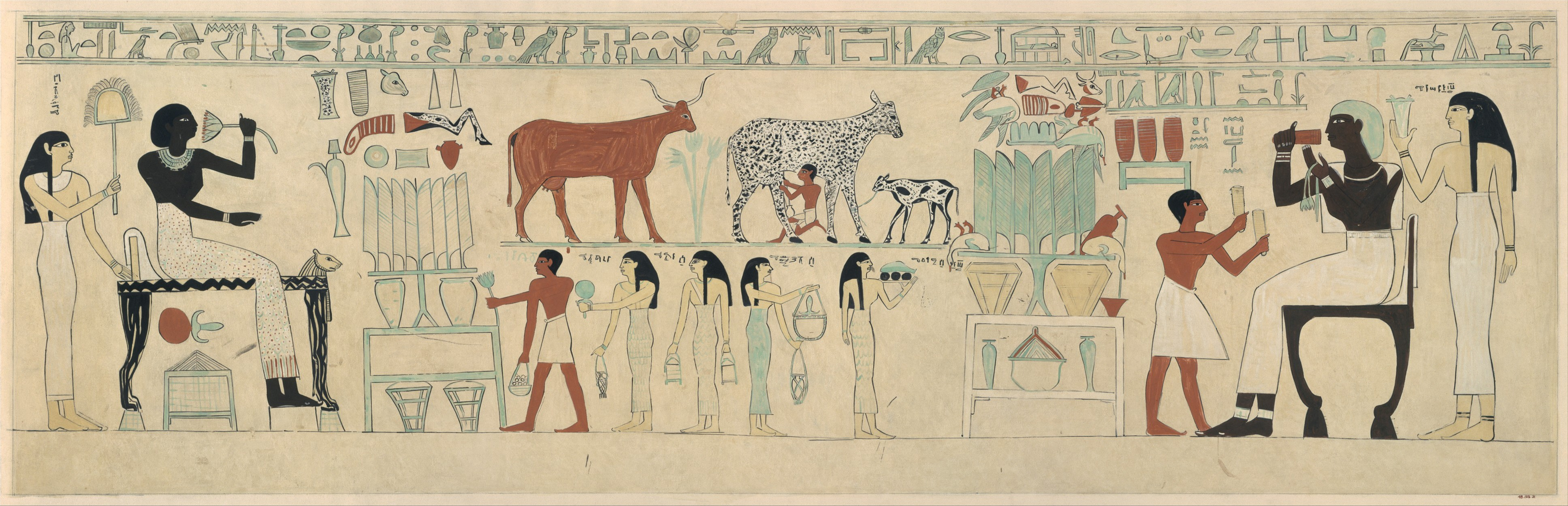
Inner back side of the sarcophagus of Aashyt (facsimile by Charles K. Wilkinson)

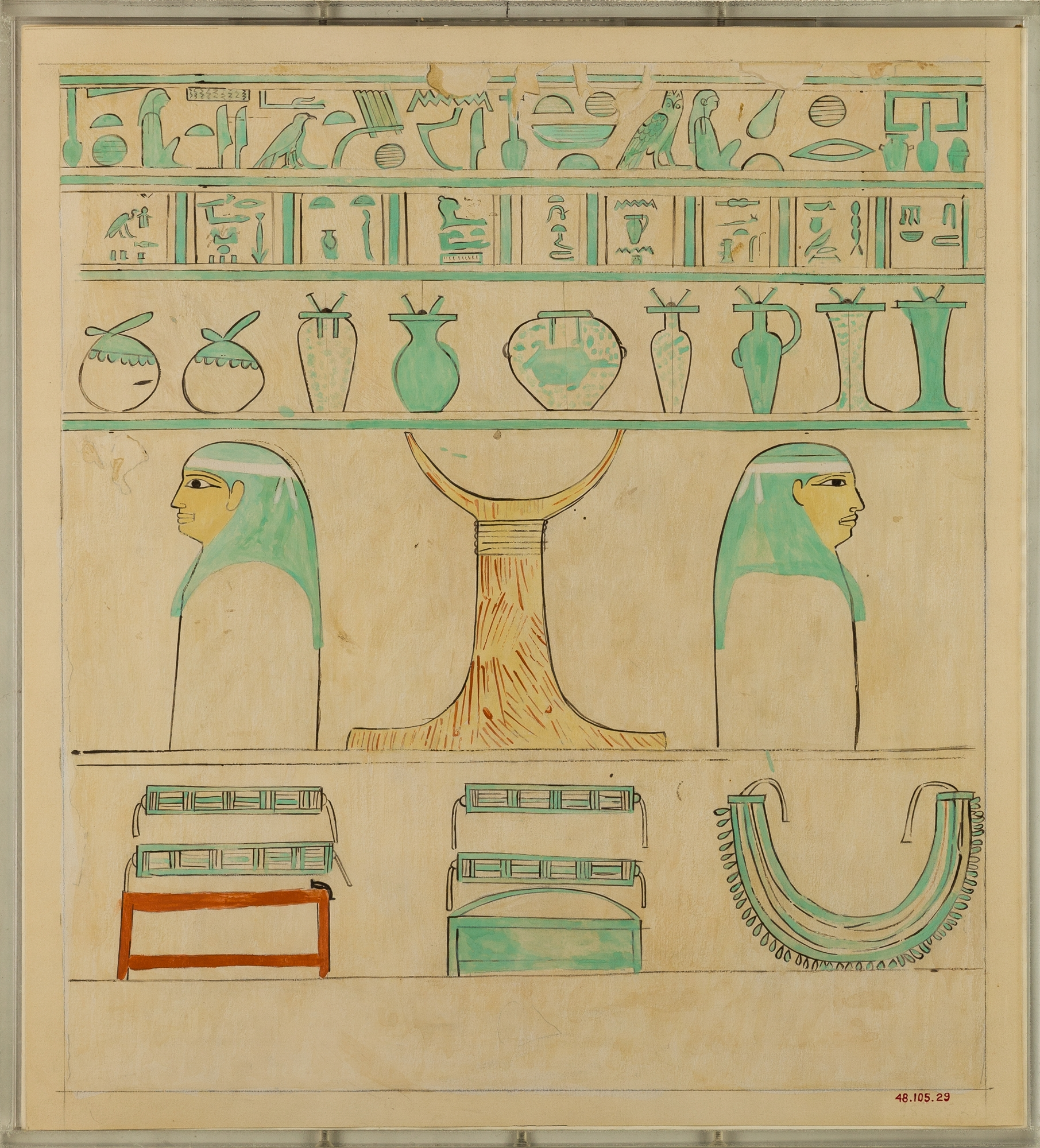
Inner head end of the sarcophagus of Aashyt (facsimile by Charles K. Wilkinson)

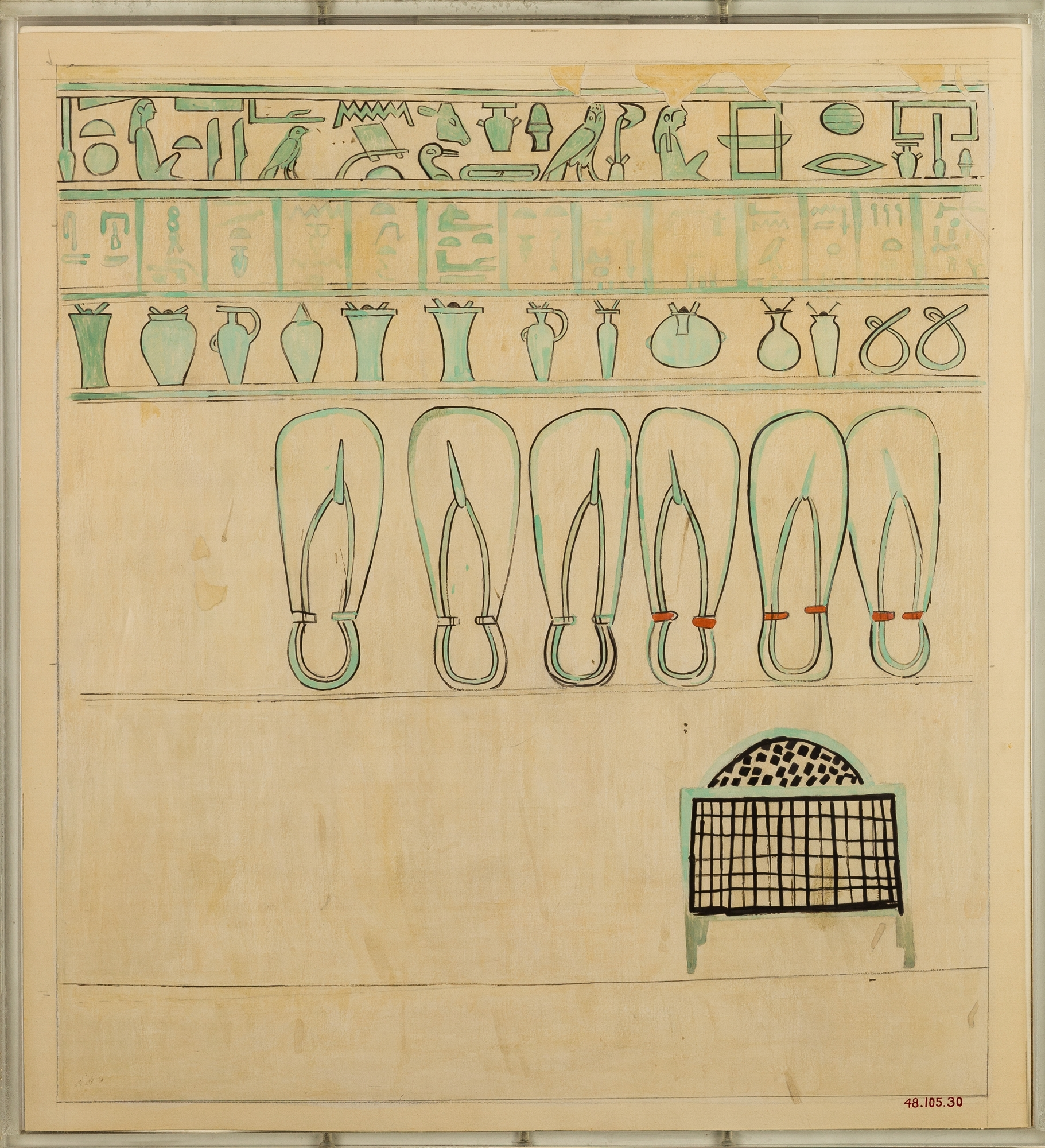
Inner foot end of the sarcophagus of Aashyt (facsimile by Charles K. Wilkinson)
