= Usersatet =

Ancient Egyptian official, viceroy of Kush

- Viceroy of Kush
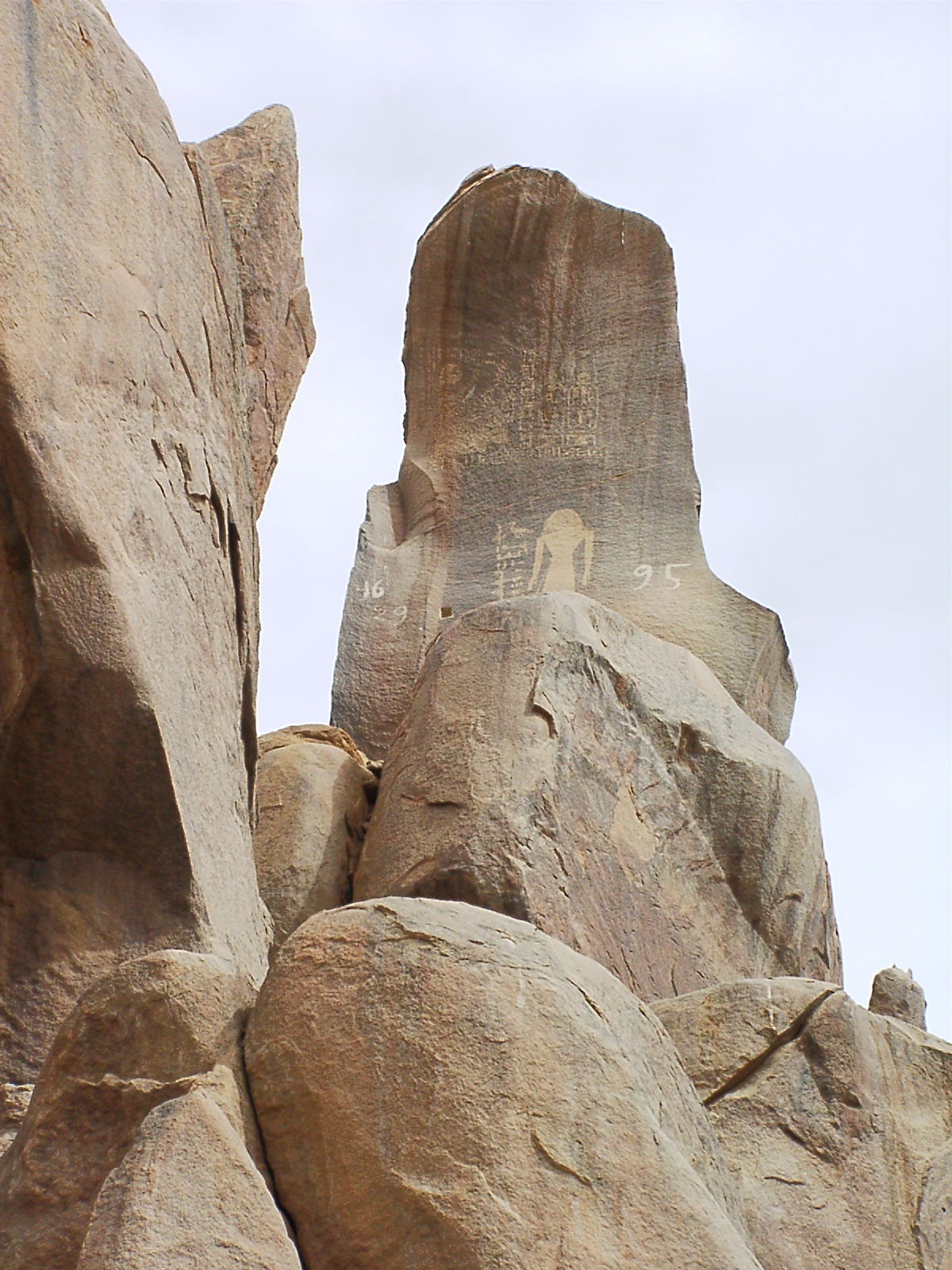
- Usersatet, depicted in a rock carving on the island of Sehel
- Predecessor: Nehi
- Successor: Amenhotep
- Dynasty: 18th Dynasty
- Pharaoh: Amenhotep II
- Father: Siamun
- Mother: Nenwenhermenetes

Usersatet was an Ancient Egyptian official with the titles king's son of Kush (Viceroy of Kush) and overseer of the southern countries. He was in office under king Amenhotep II and perhaps in the early years of the reign of Thutmosis IV. As king's son of Kush he was the main official in charge of the Nubian provinces.

Usersatet was perhaps born in Elephantine or at least the region around this island. The name Usersatet means Satet is strong, Satet being the main deity of Elephantine. Usersatet's father was Siamun, and his mother was Nenwenhermenetes, king's ornament, about both of whom not much is known.

It seems that Usersatet grew up in the royal palace and followed the king on his military campaign to Syria. He cleared five canals in the region of Aswan. The canals were already more than 700 years old and most likely had been filled with sand earlier in the 18th Dynasty. Usersatet is known from a large number of monuments, especially in Lower Nubia. Near Qasr Ibrim, he erected a chapel in honour of king Amenhotep II. A stela found at Semna bears a copy of a king's letter to Usersatet. However, no biography of this official survived. Therefore, there is not much known about his life and career. His name had been removed from many monuments, therefore it seems that he fell into dishonour at some point in his career.

His tomb has not yet been identified. A stela from Wadi el-Hudi, first described in 2017, was found showing Usersatet in front of Satet and Hathor. In March 2019, the discovery of 14 stele dated back to the Middle Kingdom was announced by archaeologists in Wadi el-Hudi. In one of the 3,400-year-old stelas was written the name of Usersatet.
