= Inebny =

Inebny, also called Amenemnekhu
- Viceroy of Kush
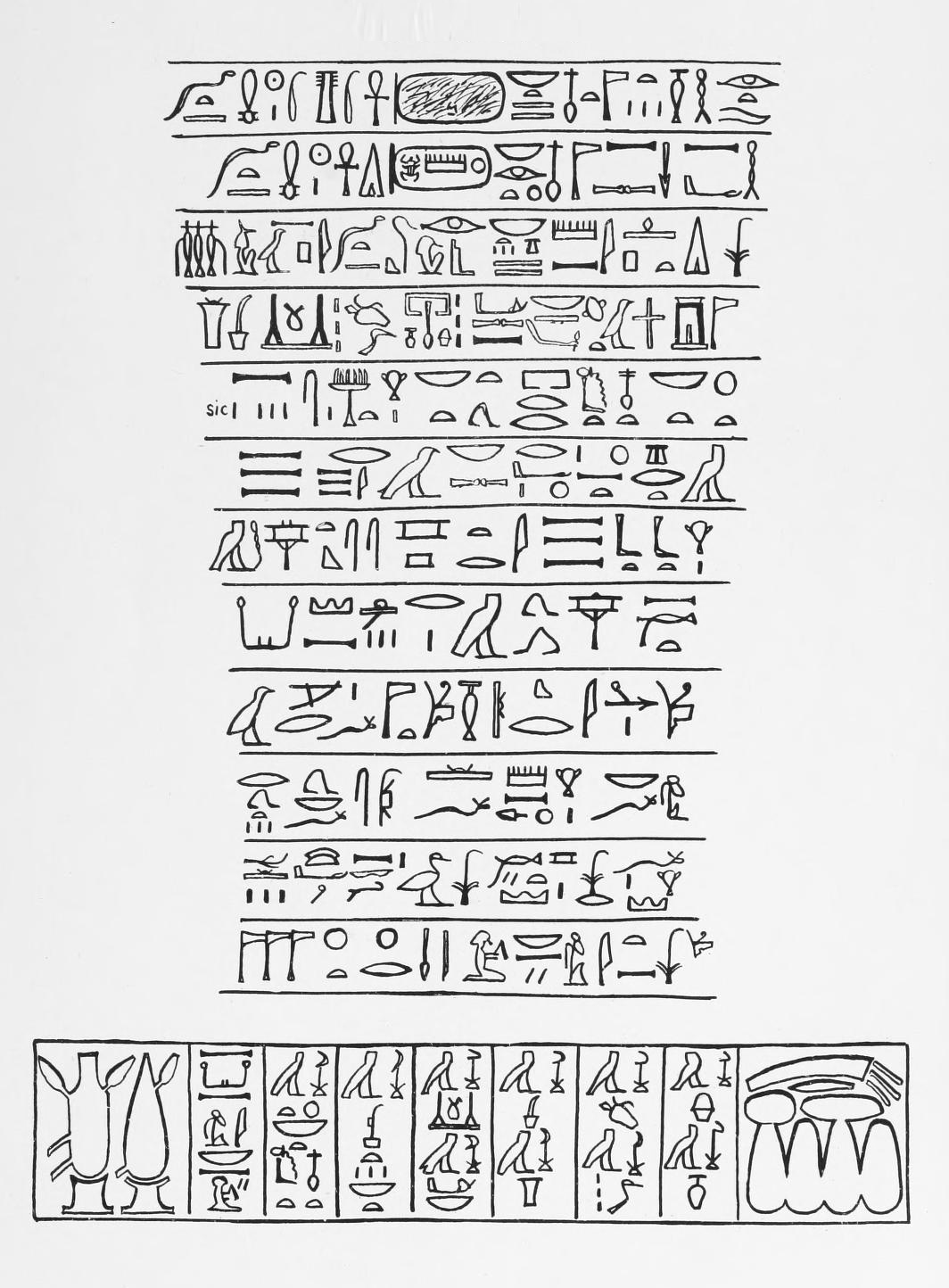
- Inscription from a statue of Inebny. Hatshepsut's name in the top cartouche was later erased.
- Predecessor: Penre
- Successor: Nehi
- Dynasty: 18th Dynasty
- Pharaoh: Hatshepsut

Inebny, also called Amenemnekhu was an ancient Egyptian official of the New Kingdom, in office under the ruling queen Hatshepsut (about 1508–1458 BC) of the 18th Dynasty. Inebny/Amenemnekhu was viceroy of Kush, therefore one of the most important officials at the royal court, ruling the Nubian provinces (Kush is the Ancient Egyptian name for Nubia). Inebny/Amenemnekhu is first attested in year 18 of the queen; a further dated inscription belongs to year 20, while around year 22/23 a certain Nehi was appointed to become viceroy of Kush. Inebny/Amenemnekhu bears two names.

For a long time it was thought that these names refer to two different people. An inscription dated to year 20 under Thutmose III showed however, that both names refer to one and the same person. In inscriptions, his name is often erased, providing evidence that he fell into dishonor at the end of his career. A block statue of him is stored in the British Museum (EA1131) although it is not on display. Inebny/Amenemnekhu is known from many rock inscriptions in Nubia. Little is known about his family. Only his brother, the deputy (idnw) and overseer of the ges-per Saimau is known.
