= Henhenet =

Egyptian queen consort

h n h n t
- King's Beloved Wife; King's Sole Ornament; Priestess of Hathor
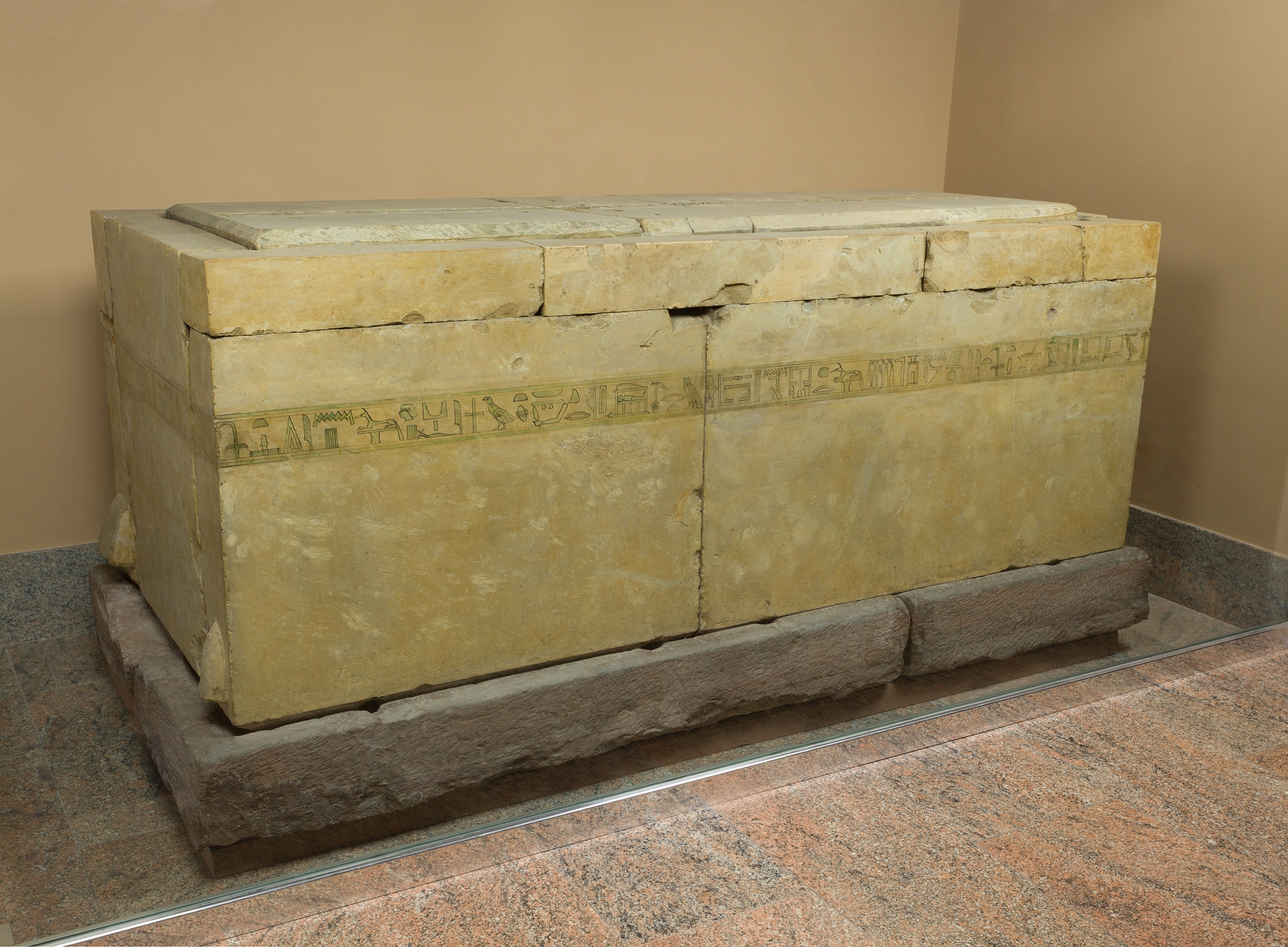
- Sarcophagus of Henhenet

Queen consort of Egypt
- Tenure: c. 2025 BC
- King: Mentuhotep II
- Born: c. 2046 BC
- Died: c. 2025 BC (aged c. 21)
- Burial: Egyptian Museum, Cairo, Egypt
- Spouse: Mentuhotep II
- Dynasty: 11th Dynasty of Egypt

Henhenet (c. 2046 BC - c. 2025 BC) was an ancient Egyptian queen consort, a lower ranking wife of King Mentuhotep II of the 11th dynasty. Her tomb (DBXI.11) and small decorated chapel were found in her husband's Deir el-Bahari temple complex, behind the main building, along with the tombs of five other ladies, Ashayet, Kawit, Kemsit, Sadeh and Mayet. Most of them were priestesses of Hathor, so it is possible that they were buried there as part of the goddess's cult, but it is also possible that they were the daughters of nobles the king wanted to keep an eye upon.

Unlike the sarcophagi of the other queens, hers was not decorated, only a single line of inscription runs on both sides. Her mummy shows that she died in childbirth when she was around 21. Her mummy is now in the Egyptian Museum in Cairo, her sarcophagus is in New York City.

Her titles were: King's Beloved Wife (ḥmt-nỉswt mrỉỉ.t=f ), King's Ornament (ẖkr.t-nỉswt), King's Sole Ornament (ẖkr.t-nỉswt wˁtỉ.t), Priestess of Hathor (ḥm.t-nṯr ḥwt-ḥrw).
