= Mayet (ancient Egypt) =

Child buried in mortuary temple of Mentuhotep II

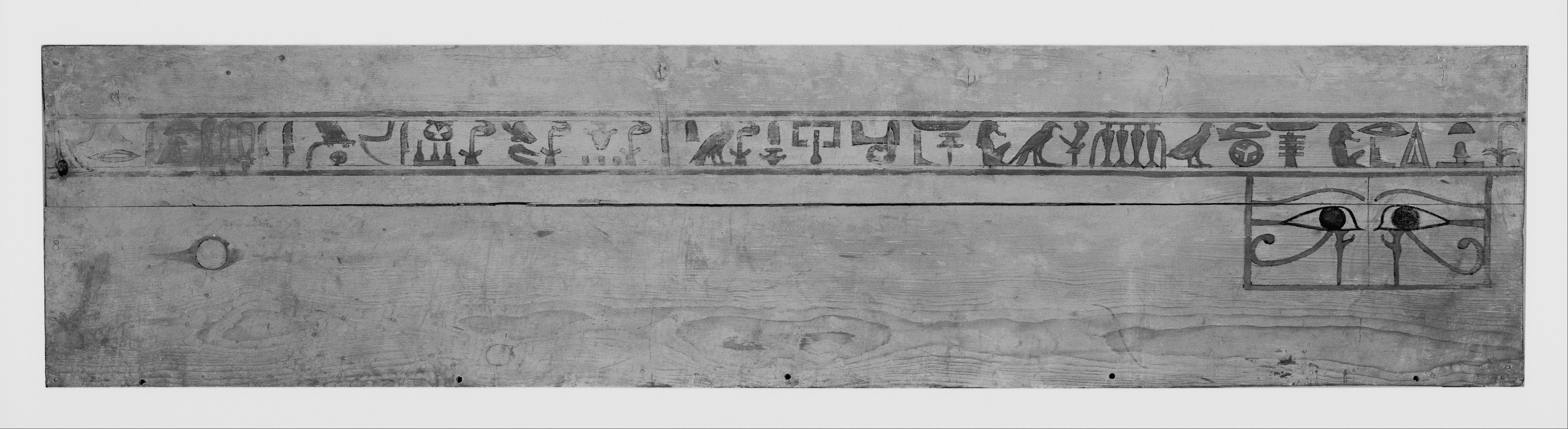
Inner wooden coffin of Mayet, Brooklyn Museum

W19 M17 M17 t E13
Mayet
in hieroglyphs
Era: Middle Kingdom
(2055–1650 BC)

Mayet (also Miiut and Miit, meaning ″the cat″) was an ancient Egyptian girl buried in the mortuary temple of King Mentuhotep II (reigned c. 2061 BC – 2010 BC) at Deir el-Bahari. Her burial was found intact. Her position within the royal family of Mentuhotep II is disputed.

Mayet was one of six royal ladies interred within Mentuhotep II's mortuary temple. Each had her own small, square, shrine-like funerary chapel, decorated with carved scenes, closed by wooden doors and containing a statue of the owner, set against the rear (western) wall of the colonnade that surrounded the complex's central pyramid. Immediately behind each chapel was a simple shaft-tomb. Mayet's chapel was the northernmost of the six, adjacent to those of Ashait and Sadeh; they were divided by a doorway from the southern group of Kemsit, Kawit, and Henhenet. Three of these women bore the title "king's wife", and five were priestesses of the goddess Hathor. However, Mayet does not bear any title on her preserved objects. Her status in relation to the king and to the other women remains obscure. It is generally assumed that she was a daughter of Mentuhotep II as she was about five years old when she died.

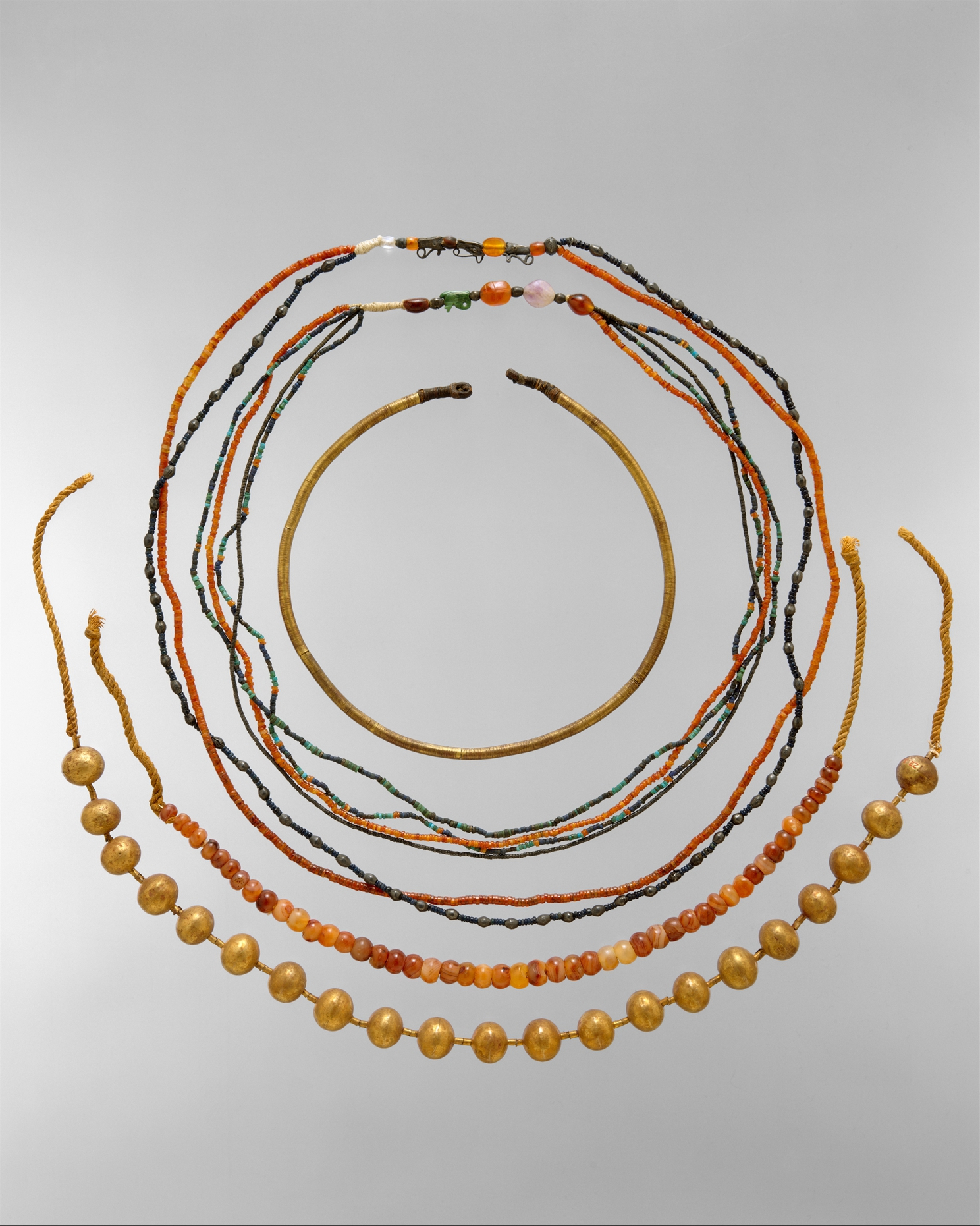
Five necklaces found within Mayet's wrappings, Metropolitan Museum of Art

Mayet's chapel was discovered in the early 1900s by the Egyptologist Édouard Naville; her burial was discovered in the 1920-1921 excavation season by the Metropolitan Museum of Art's Egyptian Expedition led by Herbert Eustis Winlock. Situated immediately behind her chapel, the vertical shaft was covered by slabs of stone pavement set in plaster.

The tomb consisted of a single chamber at the bottom of a vertical shaft. The room contained only a rectangular stone sarcophagus. Ancient robbers had entered the tomb and attempted to open the sarcophagus; they cut the bands securing the corners, filled the room with soil to the height of the lid and may have attempted to lift it as the edges were chipped and a piece of rope was found inside.

The girl was placed in a set of two nested wooden coffins within the uninscribed sarcophagus made of limestone. The outer coffin is 6.5 feet (200 cm) long and made of wood (possibly sycamore) painted white with inscriptions in green and outlined in black. The inner coffin is less than 6 feet (180 cm) long and made of cypress or pine wood coloured yellow; at the time of discovery, the lid was secured with strips of linen. Both containers were originally made for a different person, as there are signs that the name was altered for Mayet. Additionally, the coffin set is much bigger than required, suggesting that it was not destined to her. Her death was unexpected and no arrangements had been made in provision of it.

The body of Mayet lay on her side within the innermost coffin. She was covered with shrouds and her body was wrapped in layers of linen and adorned with a mummy mask. Winlock unwrapped her mummy, finding that the length of the body was extended by padding. Five necklaces were found within the wrappings, some of them made of gold and silver. Three of the necklaces were single-stranded: two were of gold, one of hollow round beads, the other of small discs strung on leather; the third was made of carnelian. The other necklaces were composed of multiple strands of tiny stone and glass beads; both featured eye of Horus beads, of silver in one necklace and of green jasper in the other. The exact order of the beads was preserved through careful excavation work, and in some cases, even the original string or leather survived.
