= Amenhotep (Viceroy of Kush) =

Ancient Egyptian official, viceroy of Kush

- Viceroy of Kush
- Predecessor: Usersatet
- Successor: Merymose
- Dynasty: 18th Dynasty
- Pharaoh: Thutmosis IV

Amenhotep was an ancient Egyptian official with the title king's son of Kush. In this function he was the main administrator of the Nubian provinces. Amenhotep was probably in office under Thutmosis IV.

Amenhotep appears with his main title in a rock inscription on the island of Sehel. Here he also bears the titles "overseer of the cattle of Amun," "overseer of works in Upper and Lower Egypt," "chief of the stalls of his majesty," "overseer of the southern foreign lands" and "king's scribe." The inscription is not dated by a king's name. However, there is a stela in the Ashmolean Museum in Oxford belonging to a "king's son, overseer of the cattle of Amun and confidant of Kush," perhaps belonging to the same person. The stela includes the names of king Thutmosis IV. If both monuments belong to the same person, Amenhotep was in office under this king. Amenhotep is also known from a statue found at Deir el Medineh.
