= Kemsit =

Egyptian queen consort

k m z i t B1
- King's Beloved Wife; King's Sole Ornament; Priestess of Hathor
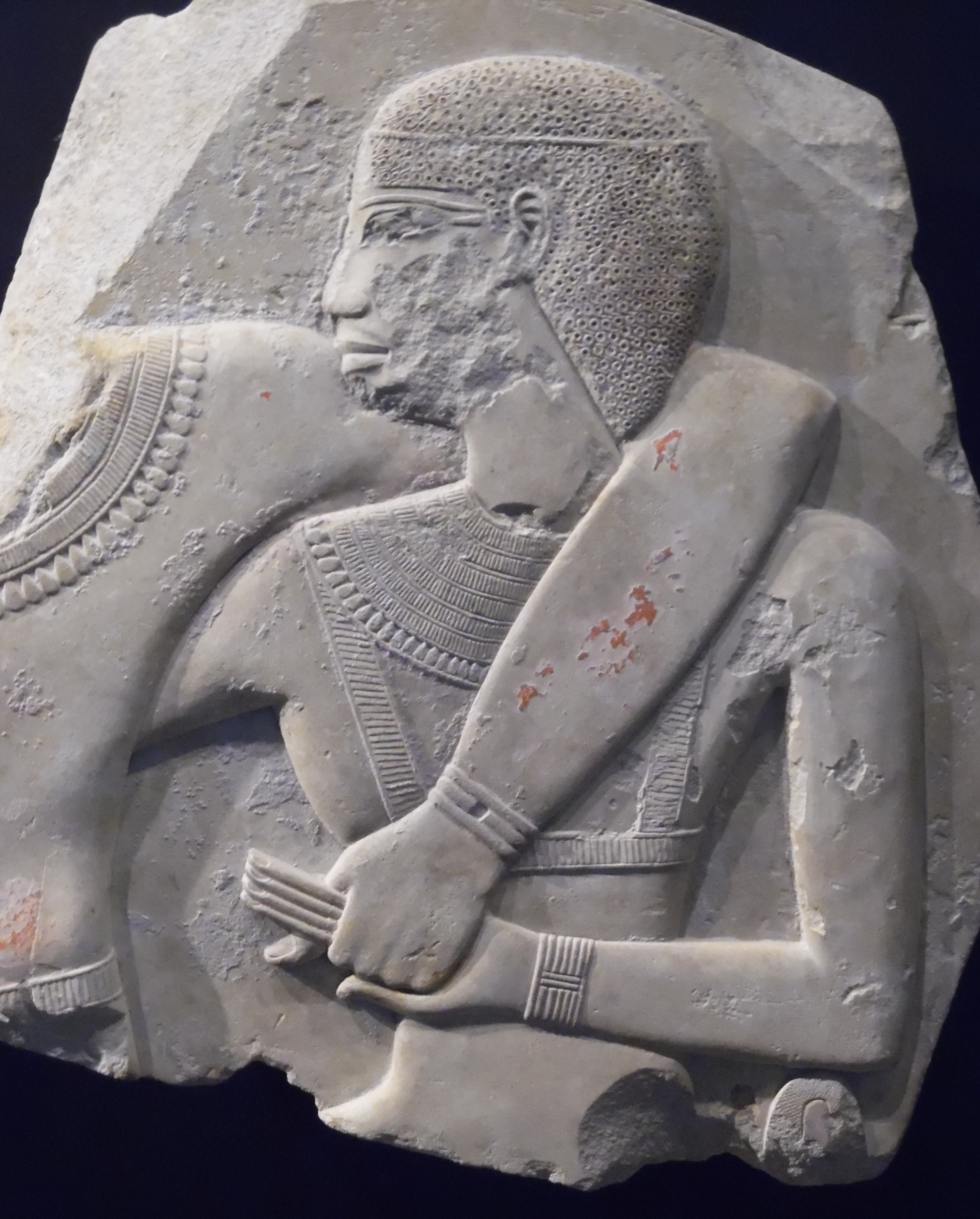
- Kemsit on a relief from Deir el-Bahari, now in Staatliche Sammlung für Ägyptische Kunst, Munich

Queen consort of Egypt
- Tenure: c. 2025 BC
- King: Mentuhotep II
- Burial: TT308, Deir el-Bahari, Egypt
- Spouse: Mentuhotep II
- Dynasty: 11th Dynasty of Egypt

Kemsit (fl. c. 2025 BC) was an ancient Egyptian queen consort, the wife of king Mentuhotep II of the 11th Dynasty. Her tomb (TT308) and small decorated chapel were found in her husband's Deir el-Bahari temple complex, behind the main building, along with the tombs of five other ladies, Ashayet, Henhenet, Kawit, Sadeh and Mayet. Most of them were priestesses of Hathor, so it is possible that they were buried there as part of the goddess's cult, but it is also possible that they were the daughters of nobles the king wanted to keep an eye upon.

Only parts of her sarcophagus have been found, these are now in the Egyptian Museum in Cairo.

The queen was also depicted on reliefs in the funerary temple of her husband Mentuhotep II. These depictions are today heavily destroyed, but it seems that she appeared in a scene showing a row of royal women. On the preserved fragments, she is shown behind queen Kawit. Her title in the depiction is King's Beloved Wife.

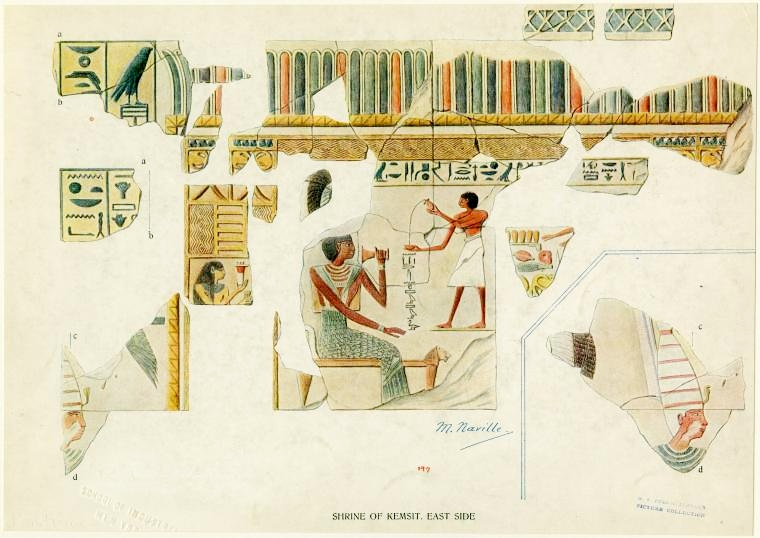
Shrine of Kemsit at the Mortuary Temple of Mentuhotep II in Deir el-Bahari.

Kemsit may have been of Nubian origin, as indicated by depictions that show her face as black or dark pink.

Her titles were: King's Beloved Wife (ḥmt-nỉswt mrỉỉ.t=f ), King's Ornament (ẖkr.t-nỉswt), King's Sole Ornament (ẖkr.t-nỉswt wˁtỉ.t), Priestess of Hathor (ḥm.t-nṯr ḥwt-ḥrw).
