= Sadeh (queen) =

Egyptian queen consort

z A d h Z1

Queen consort of Egypt
- Tenure: c. 2025 BC
- King: Mentuhotep II
- Burial: Deir el-Bahari, Luxor, Egypt
- Spouse: Mentuhotep II

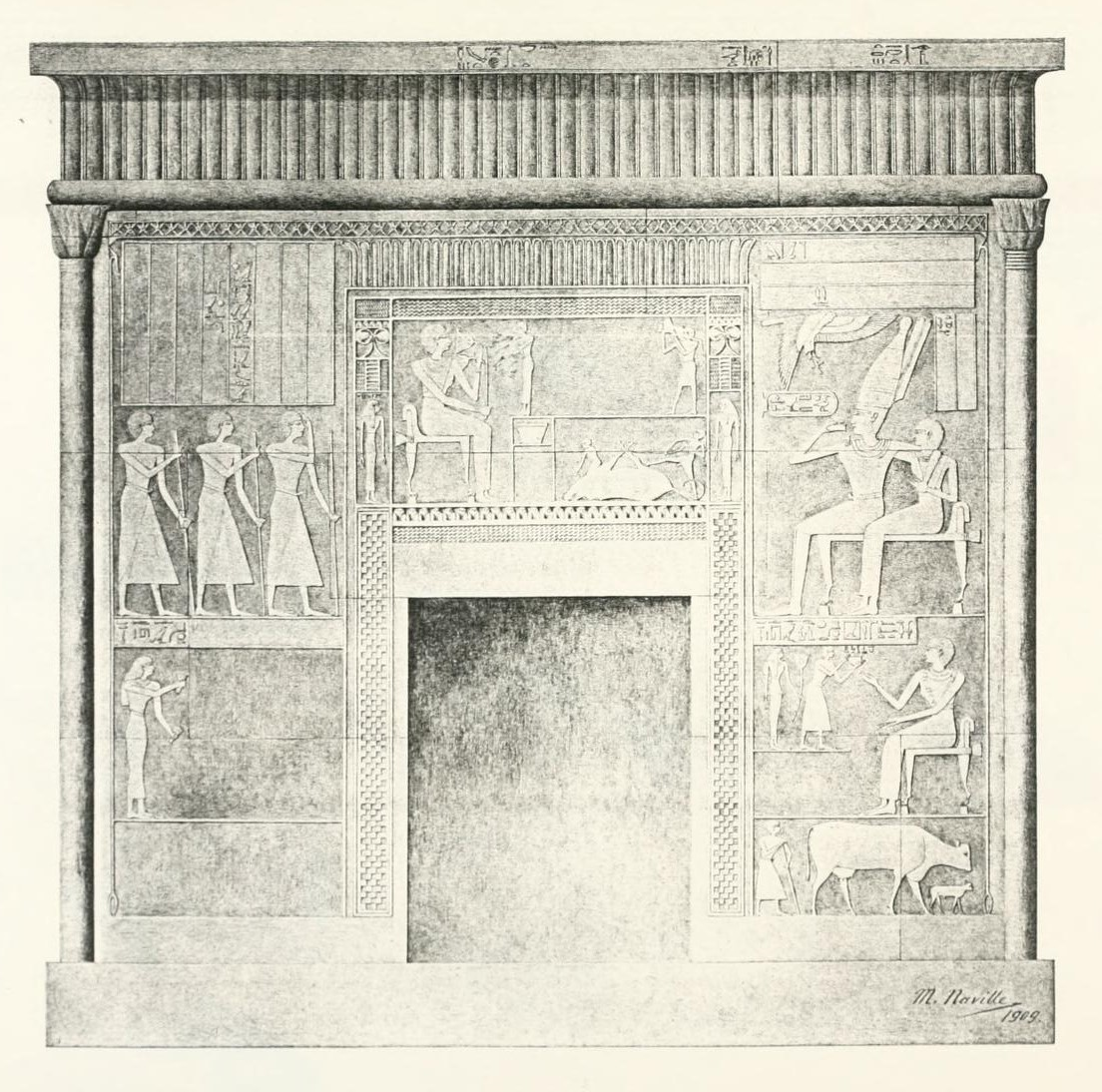
Shrine of Sadeh from Deir el-Bahari

Sadeh or Sadhe (fl. c. 2025 BC) was an ancient Egyptian queen consort, a lower ranking wife of King Mentuhotep II of the 11th Dynasty. Her tomb (DBXI.7) and small decorated chapel were found in her husband's Deir el-Bahari temple complex, behind the main building, along with the tombs of five other women, Ashayet, Henhenet, Kawit, Kemsit and Mayet. She and three other women of the six bore queenly titles, and most of them were priestesses of Hathor, so it is possible that they were buried there as part of the goddess's cult, but it is also possible that they were the daughters of nobles the king wanted to keep an eye upon.

Her titles were: King's Beloved Wife (ḥmt-nỉswt mrỉỉ.t=f ), King's Sole Ornament (ẖkr.t-nỉswt wˁtỉ.t), Priestess of Hathor (ḥm.t-nṯr ḥwt-ḥrw).
