= Dihmit South =

Middle Kingdom Egyptian Mine in Aswan Governorate

- Location within Egypt
- Location: Aswan Governorate, Egypt
- Products: amethyst

Dihmit South is an Ancient Egyptian amethyst mine and fortified mining settlement dating to the Middle Kingdom. It is about 50 km south of Aswan. Dihmit South is a part of four Middle Kingdom mines discovered east of Lake Nasser in 2014. The settlement was found with pottery associated with the Twelfth Dynasty of Egypt, as well as hieroglyphic inscriptions, one of which is dated to year 31 of Senusret I.

== History ==
Dihmit South, along with the other Middle Kingdom forts in Lower Nubia, were likely constructed during the occupation of Lower Nubia from 2000 BCE to 1700 BCE. Their purpose was facilitate mining and the protection of goods. The mine which Dihmit South was built to protect was used for amethyst as was done elsewhere during the Middle Kingdom. Modern small-scale amethyst prospecting still happens in the area.

Dihmit South is one of the main amethyst mines, and is surrounded by smaller mines that may not have been run by the Egyptian Government. These smaller sites may have been Nubian sites where the workers would live and come back.

Settlement of Dihmit South dating to the Middle Kingdom, c 1950-1700 BCE

== Construction ==
Material used to construct these forts was locally available bedrock, unlike the mudbrick commonly associated with Middle Kingdom construction along the Nile. The stone was not quarried, but rather harvested as loose rubble from local hillsides. These fortifications included solid walls, bastions, and windows. Dihmit South had walls whose length was approximately 310 meters and covered an area of approximately 5,900 square meters, including bastions and windows. The original wall height ranged from 1.5 to 2 meters.

== Research ==
Dihmit South has been visited by the Wadi el-Hudi Expedition, who is currently studying the archaeology.
