= Intef the Elder =

Egyptian nomarch, ancestor of the 11th dynasty

Intef
- Nomarch of the 4th nome of Upper Egypt
- Intef the Elder seated (center), on what is perhaps his funerary stele CG 20009
Egyptian name
r p a F4 W25 n&t&f
- Tenure: c. 2150 BC
- Successor: Mentuhotep I?
- Dynasty: ancestor of the 11th Dynasty
- Burial: uncertain, possibly a tomb at Dra' Abu el-Naga'
- Mother: Iku(i)
- Children: possibly Mentuhotep I

Intef, whose name is commonly accompanied by epithets such as the Elder, the Great (= Intef-aa) or born of Iku (fl. c. 2150 BC), was a nomarch residing at Thebes during the First Intermediate Period and later considered a founding figure of the 11th Dynasty, which eventually reunified Egypt.

== Rule ==
Intef the Elder was not a king but rather a provincial governor, known as a nomarch, ruling from the city of Thebes c. 2150 BC. He would have most likely served as nomarch during the reign of one of the Pharaohs of either the 8th, 9th or 10th dynasties, or possibly during the rule of the Herakleopolitan dynasty. Intef the Elder would have controlled the territory from Thebes to Aswan in the south, and not farther north than to Coptos, which was then controlled by another nomarch.

== Attestations ==
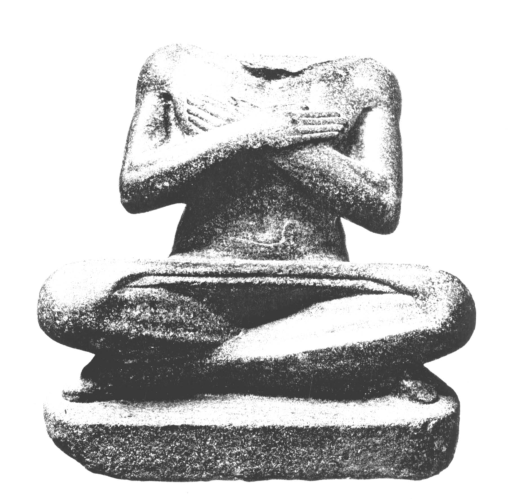
Seated statue dedicated by Senusret I to Intef the Elder, here represented as a scribe

Intef the Elder was seemingly perceived as a founding figure of the 11th Dynasty after his death. For example, his name figures in the chapel of royal ancestors (no. 13) erected at Karnak by Thutmose III over 600 years after Intef's death. In the chapel, Intef is given the titles of iry-pat ("Hereditary Prince") and haty-a ("Count"); here, his name does not appear enclosed by the cartouche, which is a pharaonic prerogative.

Intef the Elder is probably to be identified with the "Intef-aa, born of Iku", to whom Senusret I dedicated a seated statue representing Intef as a scribe:

Made by the king of Upper and Lower Egypt Kheperkare as his monument for his father prince Intef the Elder [...] born of Iku

Intef the Elder was also the object of private cults, as shown by the stele of Maati, a minor official of Mentuhotep II, which is now in the Metropolitan Museum of Art (inv. no. 14.2.7). On his stele Maati asks that prayers be told for "Intef the Elder, the son of Iku".

Intef may also be mentioned on a funerary stele found at Dendera, but most likely originating from the Theban Necropolis of Dra' Abu el-Naga'. This fragmented stele, the two pieces of which are now in museums located in Strasbourg (inv. no. 345) and Florence (inv. no. 7595), belonged to a minor official also named Intef, who was chosen by his namesake lord to attend a meeting of nomarchs in his place. The stele gives Intef the Elder the title of "Great overlord of Upper Egypt", from which it was deduced that the southernmost districts of Thebes, once the stronghold of Ankhtifi's family, had since been conquered by the Theban-Coptite coalition. The attribution of this stele to Intef the Elder is debated.

Given the importance of Intef the Elder in the eyes of his successors, Alan Gardiner proposed that Intef the Elder was mentioned on the Turin King List in column 5 line 12. This remains conjectural however as this section of the papyrus is completely missing.

=== Tomb ===
Auguste Mariette unearthed a stele of the "hereditary prince Intefi" at Dra' Abu el-Naga' on the west bank of Thebes and it's now in the Egyptian Museum CG 20009. The stele gives the titles of Intef and shows that he served an unnamed king:

An offering which the king gives to Anubis, who is upon his mountain, who is in the place of embalming, Lord of the holy place, that he may give to the hereditary prince, count, great lord of the Theban nome, satisfying the king as keeper of the gateway of the south, great pillar of him who makes his two lands to live, the chief prophet devoted to the great god Intefi.

Jürgen von Beckerath believes this stele was Intef's funerary stele, originally placed in a chapel near his tomb.

Preceded by	Nomarch of Thebes c. 2150 BC	Succeeded by Mentuhotep I?
