= Penamun =

Possible pharaoh

- Merytawy Penamun; Merytawyre Penamun
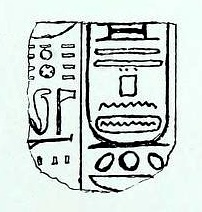
- Drawing of the block of Penamun, from Kom Abu Billo

Pharaoh
Royal titulary
Nomen
Merytawy[re?] Penamun
Mrj-tȝwj[Rˁ?] P(ȝ)-n-Jmn
Beloved of the Two Lands [...is Ra?], Penamun

G39 N5	HASH N36 N17 N16 p n N38
- Dynasty: ?

Merytawy Penamun was an ancient Egyptian pharaoh whose datation is extremely uncertain.

== Identification ==
Penamun does not appear on any king list and his damaged cartouche was only found on a stone block from Kom Abu Billo (ancient Terenuthis) in the western Nile Delta.

According to Jürgen von Beckerath, Penamun should have been a local Delta ruler during the 25th Dynasty (744–656 BC) who adopted the royal titulary; von Beckerath argues that he put his praenomen and nomen within the same cartouche, and that the lost portion on it could have contained the hieroglyph for "Re" (N5 in Gardiner's sign list) i.e. the standard suffix for pharaonic praenomina, thus becoming a Merytawyre.

Based on orthographic grounds, Kenneth Kitchen conversely opts for a later dating for Penamun, arguing that he ruled during the Persian period (starting with the 27th Dynasty, 525–404 BC) or perhaps even later.
