= Mentuhotep IV =

Egyptian pharaoh

- Mentuhotep IV (right) gives offerings to Min. From Wadi Hammamat.

Pharaoh
- Reign: c. 1997 – c. 1991 BC
- Predecessor: Mentuhotep III
- Successor: Amenemhat I
Royal titulary
Horus name
Nebtawy
Nb-t3.w(j)
Horus, Lord of the Two Lands
G5	nb N16 N16
Nebty name
Nebtawy
Nb-t3.w(j)
Lord of the Two Lands
G16	nb N16 N16
Golden Horus
Neteru Nebu
NTrw-nbw
Gold of the gods
G8	R8A S12
Prenomen
Nebtawyre
Nb-t3.w(j)-Rˁ
Lord of the Two Lands is Ra

M23 X1 L2 X1	ra nb N16 N16
Nomen
Mentuhotep
Mn-ṯw-ḥtp
Montu is Content

G39 N5	mn n T w Htp t p
- Father: possibly Mentuhotep III or II?
- Mother: Imi
- Died: c. 1991 BC
- Dynasty: 11th dynasty

Nebtawyre Mentuhotep IV (died c. 1991 BC) was the last king of the 11th Dynasty in the Middle Kingdom. He seems to fit into a 7-year period in the Turin Canon for which there is no recorded king.

== Family ==
=== King's Mother Imi ===
In Wadi Hammamat, a rock inscription (Hammamat M 191) with the royal name of Mentuhotep IV also mentions King's Mother Imi. This monument only focuses on the title King's Mother, presumably the mother of Mentuhotep IV. It does not include other titles like King's Wife, King's Sister or King's Daughter. Some have speculated that she was a concubine in the royal harem.

=== Mentuhotep III or Mentuhotep II ===
It is not certain who the father of Mentuhotep IV was. Most scholars suggest that he was the son and successor of Mentuhotep III. However, it is also possible that he was a son of Mentuhotep II, thus a brother or half-brother of Mentuhotep III. The fact that he has been omitted from several king lists indicate that there was a crisis in the order of succession during the end of the 11th Dynasty. He also represents the last king of the 11th Dynasty, and his reign is poorly documented indicating turmoil.

== Rock inscriptions ==
He is known from several inscriptions at various locations, mainly in the Eastern Desert and on the Red Sea coast, despite his reign being omitted from the Abydos King List. The inscriptions show the organization and makeup of a large expedition during his reign.

=== Wadi el-Hudi ===
Also, he is attested by the inscriptions at Wadi el-Hudi.

- Wadi el-Hudi 1 dated to Year 1
- Wadi el-Hudi 2 dated to Year 1
- Wadi el-Hudi 3 dated to Year 1
- Wadi el-Hudi 4 dated to Year 1

=== Ain Sukhna ===
At the Red Sea port of Ain Sukhna expeditions went to places like the Wadi Maghareh in the Sinai. Products like turquoise and copper were transported to Memphis some 120 km across the sand tracks of the Eastern Desert. Or perhaps transported along the Red Sea coast further south to the port of Mersa Gawasis. Inscriptions dated to Mentuhotep IV have been found.

Year 1, arrival of the king’s men; workforce: 3,000, to bring back turquoise, copper, bronze (?) and all fine products of the desert. [rnpt-zp 1: jwt mšʿ n nswt; ṯnw n mšʿ pn 3,000 n s r jnt mfkȝt, bjȝ, ḥsmn (?), jnw nb(w) nfr(w) n ḫȝst]

=== Wadi Hammamat (Eastern Desert) ===
He is known from a few inscriptions in Wadi Hammamat that record expeditions to the Red Sea coast and to quarry stone for the royal monuments. One of these inscriptions confirms the name of his mother to be King's Mother Imi. The leader of an expedition to Wadi Hammamat, during the second year of Mentuhotep IV's reign, was his vizier, Amenemhat, who is assumed to be the future king Amenemhat I, the founder of the 12th Dynasty, and Mentuhotep's immediate successor.

- Hammamat G 52
- Hammamat G 53
- Hammamat G 54 dated to Year 2
- Hammamat G 55
- Hammamat G 56
- Hammamat G 57 dated to Year 2
- Hammamat G 58
- Hammamat G 59
- Hammamat G 60
- Hammamat G 73
- Hammamat G 140
- Hammamat M 1
- Hammamat M 40
- Hammamat M 55
- Hammamat M 105
- Hammamat M 110 dated to Year 2 by Vizier Amenemhat {jrj-pꜥt; jmj-rꜣ njwt; ṯꜣtj; jmj-rꜣ kꜣt nsw n mḥ-jb jmn-m-ḥꜣt}
- Hammamat M 113 dated to Year 2 by Vizier Amenemhat {jrj-pꜥt; jmj-rꜣ njwt; ṯꜣtj; jmj-rꜣ kꜣt nsw n mḥ-jb jmn-m-ḥꜣt}
- Hammamat M 191
- Hammamat M 192 dated to Year 2 by Vizier Amenemhat {jrj-pꜥt; jmj-rꜣ njwt; ṯꜣtj; jmj-rꜣ kꜣt nsw n mḥ-jb jmn-m-ḥꜣt}
- Hammamat M 205 by Vizier Amenemhat {jrj-pꜥt; jmj-rꜣ njwt; ṯꜣtj jmn-m-ḥꜣt}
- Hammamat M 241

== Other attestations ==
Mentuhotep IV is attested on the Karnak king list in #31 under his prenomen of Nebtawyre. Today it is damaged and reads as "[...]re".

At Lisht North, a fragment of a slate bowl was regarded for a long time to be inscribed on the outside with the official titulary of Mentuhotep IV, and on the inside with that of King Amenemhat I, his successor. Since the two inscriptions are incised in a different style of writing, according to Dorothea Arnold, this indicates that Amenemhat had his name added to an older vessel that already bore the name of Mentuhotep IV. However, Peter Janosi showed that Mentuhotep IV is not mentioned on the bowl, the titulary preserved there fits better to Mentuhotep II.

== End of reign ==
It is assumed by some Egyptologists that Amenemhat either usurped the throne or assumed power after Mentuhotep IV died childless. There is currently no archaeological or textual evidence to prove that Mentuhotep was deposed by his vizier or that he chose Amenemhat to be his designated successor. Perhaps either situation is possible, or another unknown one is. Nobody truly knows how Amenemhat I rose to the throne. Neither his mummy nor his burial place have been found.

== See also ==
- Eleventh Dynasty of Egypt family tree

Preceded by Mentuhotep III	King of Egypt c. 1997 – c. 1991 BC	Succeeded by Amenemhat I
