= Eleventh Dynasty of Egypt =

Ancient Egyptian dynasty (c. 2150–c. 1991 BC)

11th Dynasty of Egypt
- c. 2040 BC–c. 1991 BC
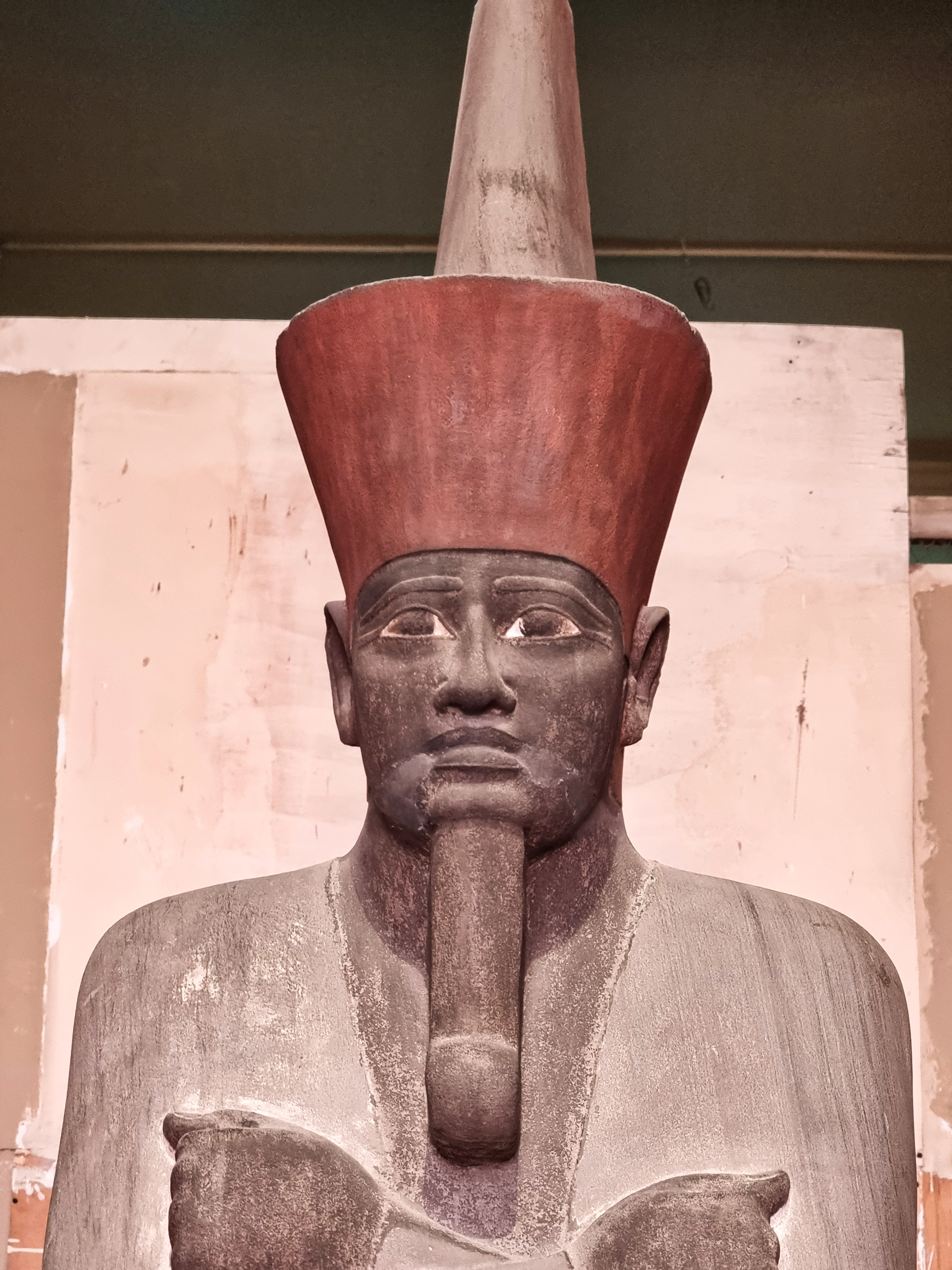
- Painted osiride sandstone seated Ka statue of king Nebhepetre Mentuhotep II, on display at the Egyptian Museum, Cairo
- Capital: Thebes
- Common languages: Egyptian
- Religion: ancient Egyptian religion
- Government: Absolute monarchy
- Monarch
  - c. 2040 – c. 2009 BC: Mentuhotep II
  - c. 2009 – c. 1997 BC: Mentuhotep III
  - c. 1997 – c. 1991 BC: Mentuhotep IV
- Historical era: Bronze Age
  - Established: c. 2040 BC
  - Disestablished: c. 1991 BC
Preceded by	Succeeded by
8th Dynasty of Egypt; 10th Dynasty of Egypt	12th Dynasty of Egypt

The 11th Dynasty of ancient Egypt (notated Dynasty XI; c. 2150 BC – c. 1991 BC) is a well-attested group of rulers. Its earlier members before King Mentuhotep II are grouped with the four preceding dynasties to form the First Intermediate Period, whereas the later members are considered part of the Middle Kingdom. They all ruled from Thebes in Upper Egypt.

== Characteristics ==
The relative chronology of the 11th Dynasty is well established by contemporary attestations and, except for count Intef and Mentuhotep IV, by the Turin canon.

Manetho's statement that the 11th Dynasty consisted of 16 kings, who reigned for 43 years is contradicted by contemporary inscriptions and the evidence of the Turin King List, whose combined testimony establishes that this kingdom consisted of seven kings who ruled for a total of 143 years. However, his testimony that this dynasty was based at Thebes is verified by the contemporary evidence. It was during this dynasty that all of ancient Egypt was united under the Middle Kingdom.

This dynasty traces its origins to a nomarch of Thebes, "Intef the Great, son of Iku", who is mentioned in a number of contemporary inscriptions. However, his immediate successor Mentuhotep I is considered the first king of this dynasty.

An inscription carved during the reign of Wahankh Intef II shows that he was the first of this dynasty to claim to rule over the whole of Egypt, a claim which brought the Thebans into conflict with the 10th-Dynasty rulers of Herakleopolis Magna. Intef undertook several campaigns northwards, and captured the important nome of Abydos.

Warfare continued intermittently between the Theban and Heracleapolitan dynasts until shortly before the 39th regnal year of Nebhepetre Mentuhotep II, when the Herakleopolitans were defeated, and this dynasty could begin to consolidate their rule. The rulers of the 11th Dynasty reasserted Egypt's influence over her neighbors in Africa and the Near East. Mentuhotep II sent renewed expeditions to Phoenicia to obtain cedar. Sankhkare Mentuhotep III sent an expedition from Coptos south to the land of Punt.

The reign of its last king, and thus the end of this dynasty, is something of a mystery. Contemporary records refer to "seven empty years" following the death of Mentuhotep III, which correspond to the reign of Nebtawyre Mentuhotep IV. Modern scholars identify his vizier Amenemhat with Amenemhat I, the first king of 12th Dynasty, as part of a theory that Amenemhat became king as part of a palace coup. The only certain details of Mentuhotep's reign was that two remarkable omens were witnessed at the quarry of Wadi Hammamat by the vizier Amenemhat. Nobody knows for certain how Amenemhat I rose to power and became the next king.

== Rulers of the 11th Dynasty ==
Initially the rulers of the 11th Dynasty were only Nomarchs but starting during the reign of Intef I they declared themselves pharaohs

Nomarchs of Dynasty XI
Nomarchs	Image	Reign	Burial	Consort(s)	Comments
Intef the Elder		c. 2150 BC	Dra' Abu el-Naga, Thebes		First ruler of Dynasty XI
Mentuhotep I		c. 2134 BC – ?	Dra' Abu el-Naga?	Neferu I	Considered Pharaoh by later members of the Eleventh Dynasty and posthumously given the Horus name Tepy-a, meaning "the ancestor"
Intef I		? – c. 2118 BC	El-Tarif, Thebes		Possible Son of Mentuhotep I, later became pharaoh

Dynasty 11 Monarchs of South Egypt
Pharaoh	Horus name	Image	Reign	Burial	Consort(s)	Comments
Intef I	Sehertawy		? – c. 2118 BC	El-Tarif, Thebes		Possible Son of Mentuhotep I
Intef II	Wahankh		c. 2118 – c. 2069 BC	El-Tarif, Thebes	Neferukayet?	Brother of Intef I
Intef III	Nakhtnebtepnefer		c. 2069 – c. 2060 BC	El-Tarif, Thebes	Iah	Son of Intef II
Nebhepetre Mentuhotep II	Seankhibtawy (originally); Netjerihedjet (later, pre-reunification); Sematawy (later, post-reunification)		c. 2060 – c. 2040 BC	Deir el-Bahari	Tem; Neferu II; Kawit; Henhenet; Ashayet; Kemsit; Sadeh	

Dynasty 11 Monarchs of Egypt
Portrait	Name	Reign	Burial	Consort(s)	Lifespan
	Mentuhotep II	c. 2040 - c. 2009 BC	Deir el-Bahari	Tem; Neferu II; Kawit; Henhenet; Ashayet; Kemsit; Sadeh	Died c. 2009 BC
	Mentuhotep III	c. 2009 – c. 1997 BC	Deir el-Bahari		Died c. 1997 BC
	Mentuhotep IV	c. 1997 – c. 1991 BC	Deir el-Bahari?		Died c. 1991 BC

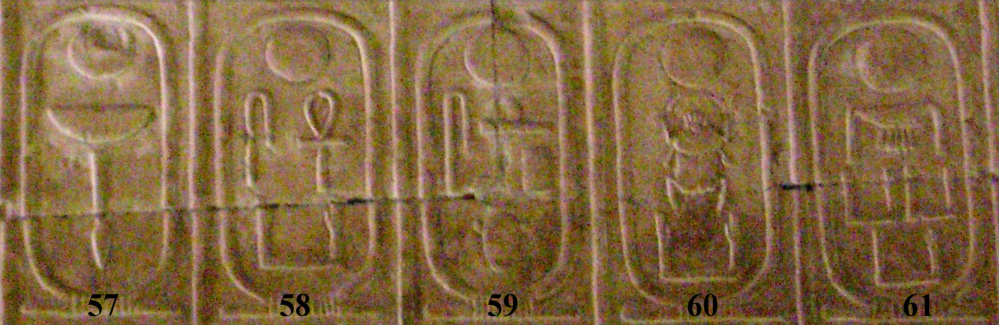
Abydos King List, Royal cartouches 57 through 61

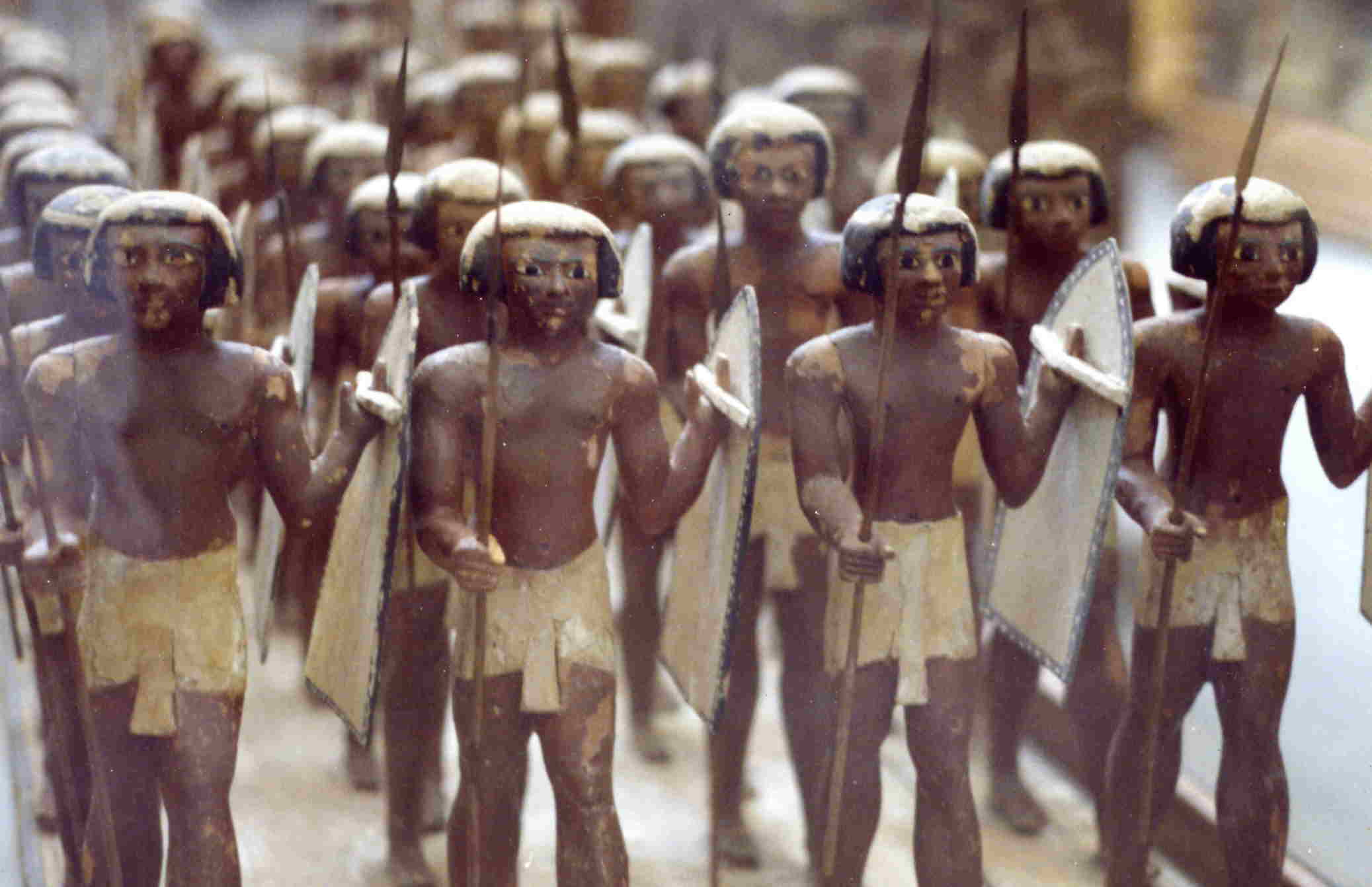
11th Dynasty model of Egyptian soldiers from the tomb of Mesehti

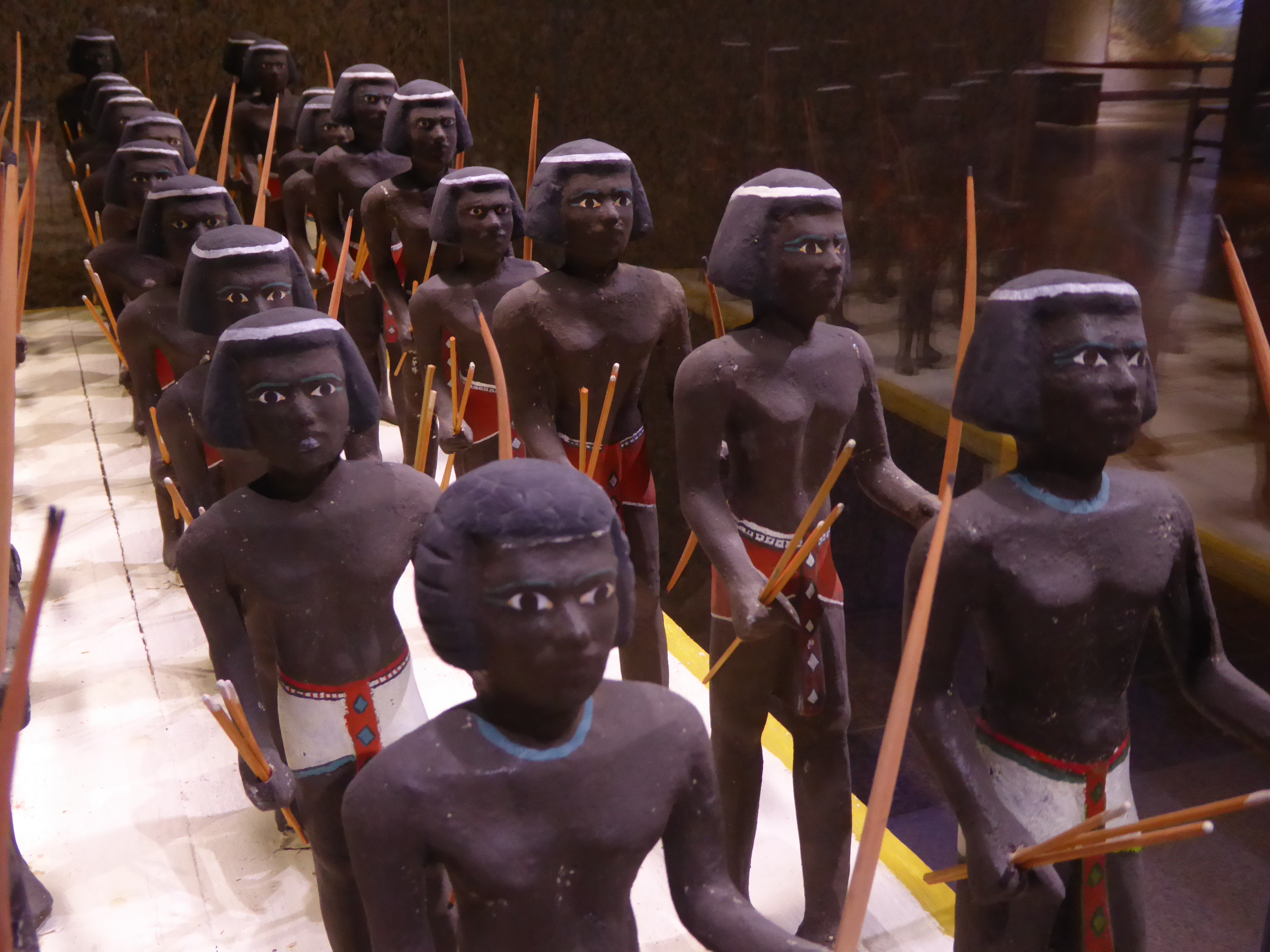
11th Dynasty model of Nubian archers from a tomb in Asyut

== Comparison of regnal lists ==
Kings Mentuhotep II and Mentuhotep III are the most commonly included kings of this dynasty to appear on Egyptian king lists, while their successor Mentuhotep IV was often ignored. The Karnak King List provides the most complete surviving list of names for the eleventh dynasty, beginning with the nomarch Intef the Elder, whose name is the only one on this list that does not have a cartouche because he never reigned as Pharaoh, and ending with Mentuhotep IV, one of the few lists to include him. Several names are lost and damaged, but can still be reconstructed. Some of them like Mentuhotep I and the Intef pharaohs are accompanied by their Horus name, though some of them are damaged.

The Turin King List begins this dynasty with Mentuhotep I and provides reign lengths for individual kings, however it is in a fragmentary state and some information is now lost. Mentuhotep IV is not mentioned at all, but the list does note "a lacuna of 7 years" following Mentuhotep III.

Historical Nomarch or Pharaoh	Karnak King List	Abydos King List	Saqqara Tablet	Turin King List	Turin Reign Lengths
Intef the Elder	Intef	–	–	–	–
Mentuhotep I	Men[tuhotep]	–	–	Name lost	Lost
Intef I	In[tef]	–	–	Name lost	Lost
Intef II	Intef	–	–	[I]n[tef]	49 years
Intef III	Name lost	–	–	Name lost	8 years
Mentuhotep II	Nebhepetre	Nebhepetre	Nebhepetre	Nebhapetre	51 years
Mentuhotep III	Seneferkare	Sankhkare	Seankhkare	Sankhka(re)	12 years
Mentuhotep IV	[Nebtawy]re	–	–	Omitted	7 years

== See also ==
- Eleventh Dynasty of Egypt family tree
- Middle Kingdom of Egypt

== Notes ==
Preceded by 10th Dynasty	Dynasty of Egypt c. 2040 BC − c. 1991 BC	Succeeded by 12th Dynasty
