= Priestess of Hathor =

Ancient Egyptian priestess at Dendera

the goddess Hathor

Priestess of Hathor or Prophetess of Hathor was the title of the Priestess of the goddess Hathor in the Temple of Dendera in Ancient Egypt.

== Title ==
The title is known to be given during the Old Kingdom of Egypt, and was at that point very powerful and prestigious. The mummies of the priestesses testify that they were decorated with a religious tattoo, covering the stomach around the area of the uterus. After the Middle Kingdom of Egypt, the title was often irregularly awarded the women of the royal family, typically princesses.

== History ==
The rise, fall and extinction of the priestesses of Hathor are seen in ancient Egyptian culture. The women who wanted to become socially powerful usually took refuge in religion and took the charge of priesthood.

Ancient Egyptian society took women's empowerment much more loosely than ancient Greece and ancient Rome. There women were given the right to their own property. However, after becoming a priestess, a woman is seen not only as an important figure in ancient Egyptian society, but also a living symbol of divinity.

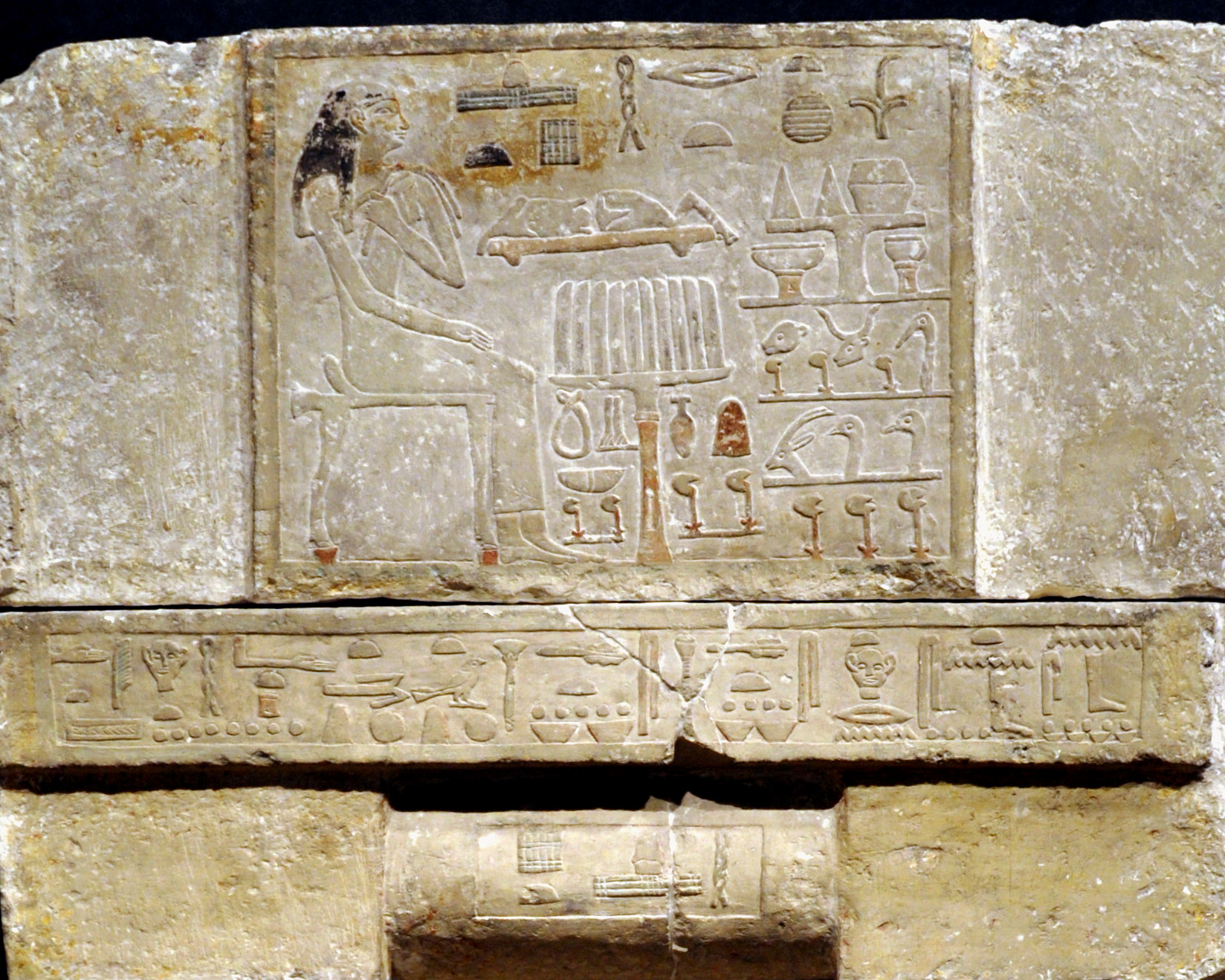
Hetpet priestess of Hathor, old kingdom, 5th dynasty

== Role ==
The priestesses of Hathor were called hm ntr hthr, one of the most common title for women in the Old up to the early Middle Kingdom. But after the Middle Kingdom of Egypt, the title was often irregularly awarded only to the women of the royal family, typically princesses. This includes the daughter of Ramesses II. At one time their names were completely erased from history. It seems that the title in the Old and Middle Kingdom did not actually refer to a proper cult of Hathor, but rather announced the role as female musician in any temple cult. Hathor was the goddess of music and making music was serving Hathor. In the New Kingdom the title priestesses of Hathor became very rare, as the title chantress became common and replaced it as title for a female musician in a temple cult.

Egyptologysts have shown that in early days only women of aristocratic lineage could be appointed to the priesthood of Hathor. They were called God's Consort (Hmt nTr). They performed dances and songs during the sacred rites. Because of their menstruation and ability to give child-birth, they were considered unholy, which is why they could not perform sacred duties like dressing up the sacred image of deity.

== Origin ==
The first woman to be mentioned as a priestess of Hathor is Neferhetepes. She was the daughter of Pharaoh Djedefre. However, the name of Hathor is not found in the earlier history of Egypt.

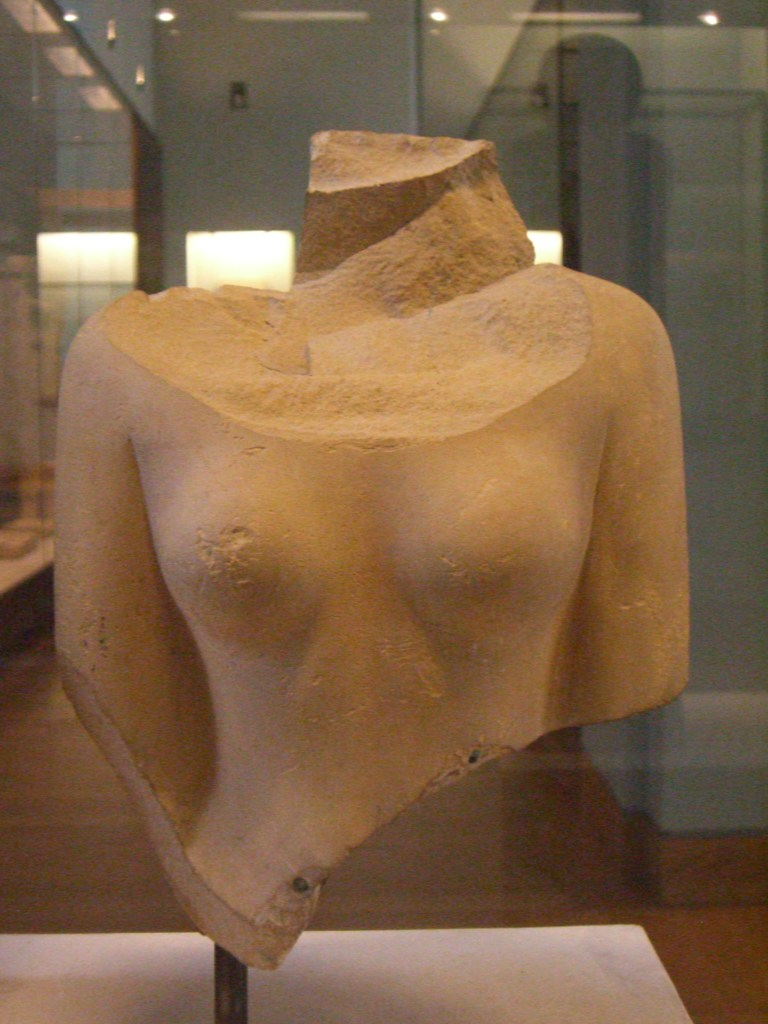
Statue of Neferhetepes

== Worship ==
Priestesses of Hathor worshipped the Goddess in her main shrine which was known as the temple of Hathor, located near the Nile basin. It is estimated that about four hundred priestesses were employed for her. There, improvement was the greatest during the reign of Pharaoh Menkaure. Archaeologists have unearthed several colourful paintings depicting the Goddess and Menkaure. He had also established the priestesses of Hathor in other places. It is seen in the royal stamp that he himself used to worship Hathor.

Goddess worship was the most prevalent during the fifth dynasty. At this time her shrines were established in Userkaf and other places. her idol was also placed in the royal funeral temple. Two main places of her worship were in Giza Necropolis, South of Memphis. However, the researcher speculated that the two were interconnected.

== Rise and fall ==
During the sixth dynasty, the administrative system of the priests underwent several changes, as power was in the hands of the ministers, the number of priests increased during the reign of Pepi I. However during the twelfth dynasty most of the female priests gradually became extinct.

== Decline and disappearance ==
The last notable Priestess of Hathor, was the wife of Senusret I, an important minister of that time. There were several more priestesses at the time, but the numbers were rapidly decreasing. Later their names were completely erased from history.
