= Joyce Tyldesley =

British archaeologist and Egyptologist

Joyce Tyldesley OBE
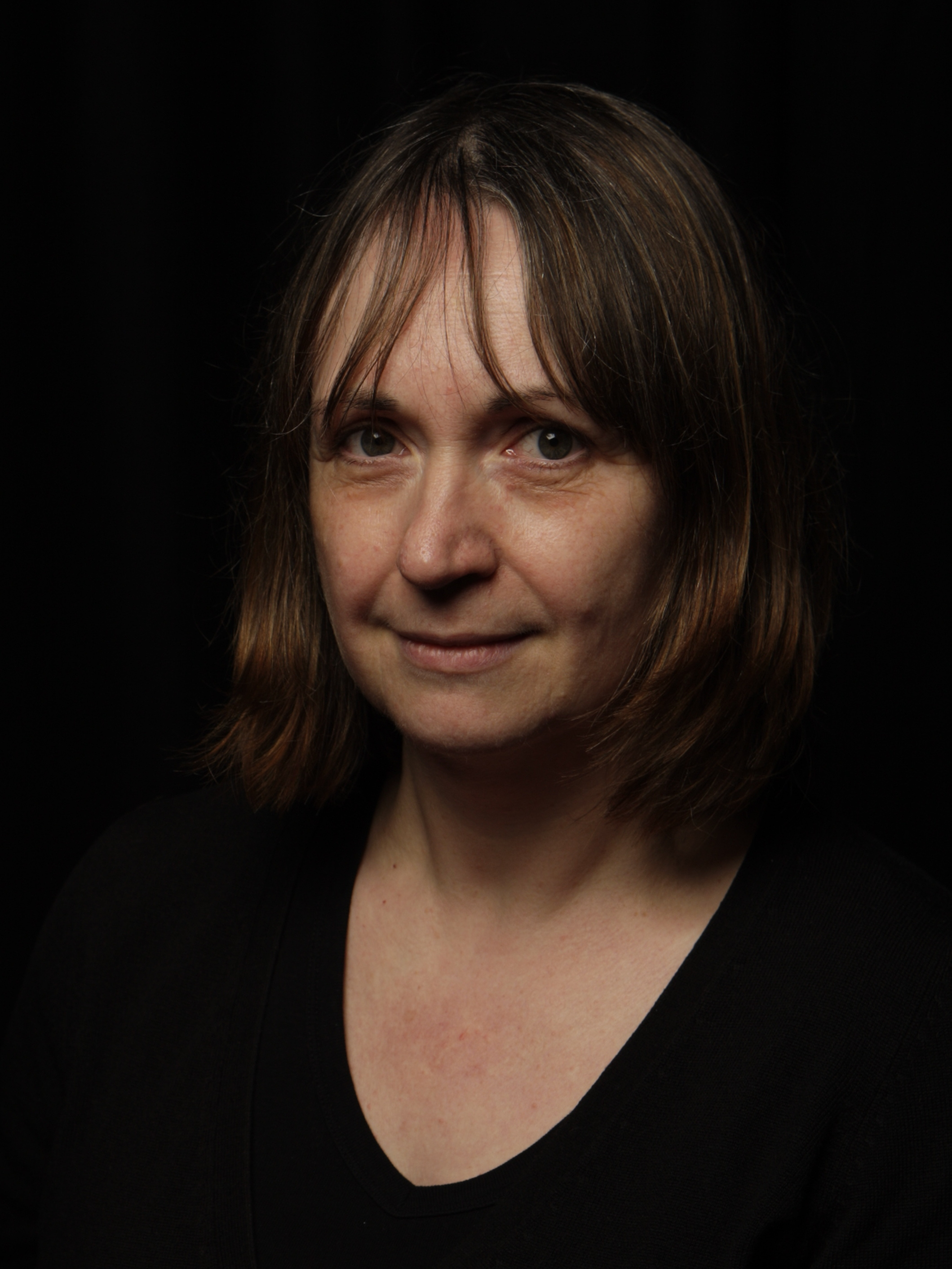
- Joyce Tyldesley in 2011
- Born: February 25, 1960 (age 66)
- Employer: University of Manchester
- Awards: Felicia A. Holton Book Award (2014)

Academic background
- Education: Bolton School
- Alma mater: University of Liverpool (BA); University of Oxford (DPhil)
- Thesis: The latest handaxe industries of the British Palaeolithic, with reference to their affinities in north-west Europe (1986)

Academic work
- Discipline: Egyptology; Archaeology
- Website: research.manchester.ac.uk/en/persons/joyce.tyldesley

Joyce Ann Tyldesley OBE (born 25 February 1960) is a British Archaeologist and Egyptologist, academic, writer and broadcaster who specialises in research on women in ancient Egypt. She was interviewed on the TV series Cunk on Earth, about Egyptian pyramids, in 2022.

== Education and early life ==
Tyldesley was born in Bolton, Lancashire and privately educated at Bolton School. In 1981, she earned a first-class honours degree in archaeology from the University of Liverpool specialising in the Eastern Mediterranean. She moved to the University of Oxford; initially at St Anne's College, Oxford then, following the award of a scholarship, at St Cross College, Oxford. In 1986, she was awarded a Doctor of Philosophy degree in Paleolithic archaeology, for her thesis on Mousterian bifaces (handaxes) in Northern Europe.

== Career and research ==
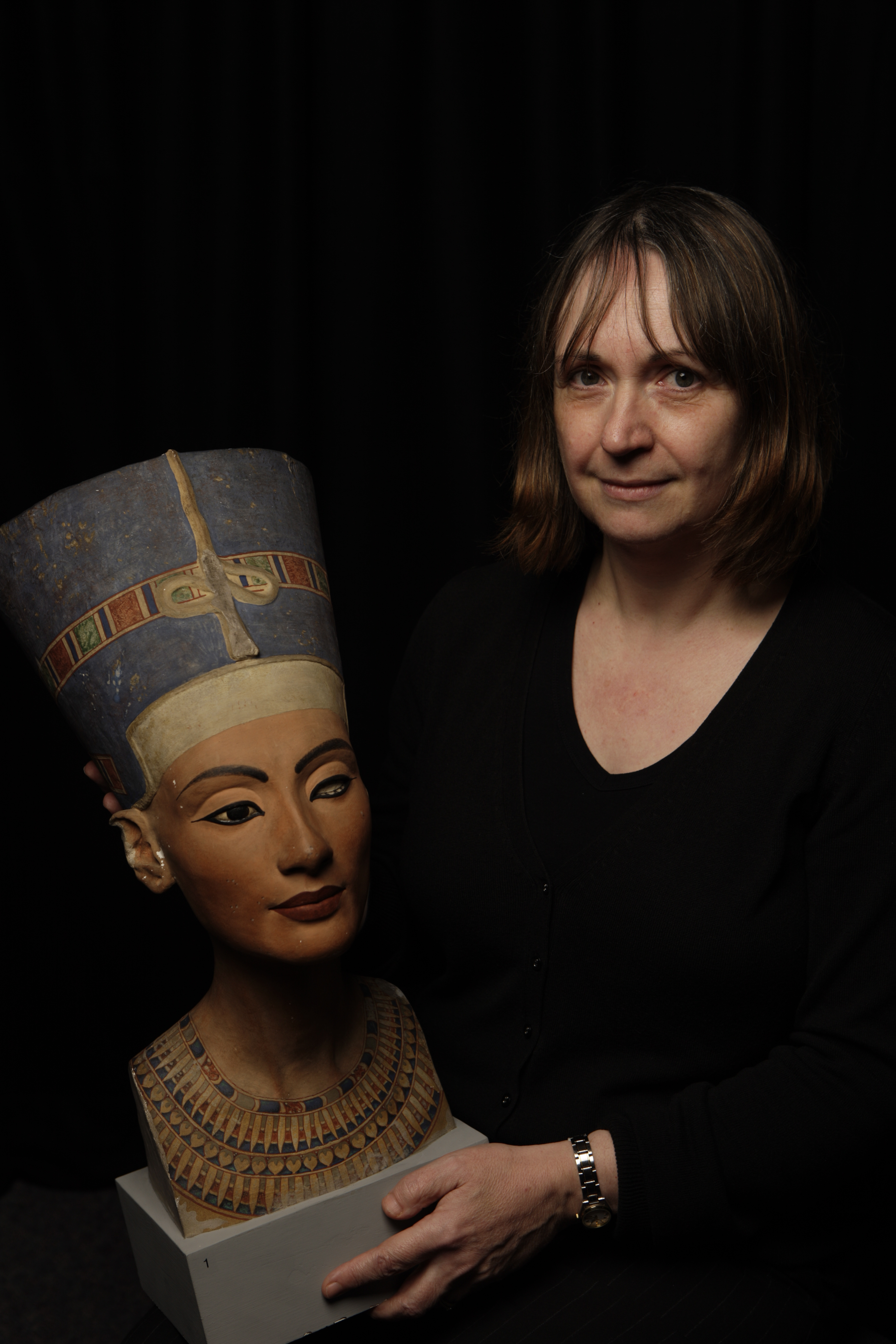
Joyce Tyldesley holding a replica Nefertiti bust

After her DPhil, Tyldesley then returned to Liverpool as a lecturer in Prehistoric Archaeology. Tyldesley next worked as a freelance Egyptologist/archaeologist; writing books, working with television companies, and teaching in further and higher education and online.

In 2007, she joined the University of Manchester, as a joint appointment between the Manchester Museum and the Faculty of Life Sciences. As of 2023, she is Professor of Egyptology in the Department of Classics, Ancient History, Archaeology and Egyptology where she is tutor and Programme Director of the three-year online Certificate in Egyptology programme, the two-year online Diploma in Egyptology programme and the two year part-time online Master of Arts (MA) degree in Egyptology programme. She has devised, writes, directs and teaches a suite of on-line Short Courses in Egyptology, and has created several free online Egyptology massive open online course (MOOCs), working in conjunction with the Manchester Museum. Mumford the Mummy is a series of lessons aimed at Key Stage 2 children primary school, freely available online.

Tyldesley is a Senior Fellow of the Higher Education Academy (SFHEA) and a Research Associate of the Manchester Museum. Tyldesley is President of Bolton Archaeology and Egyptology Society and a former trustee of the Egypt Exploration Society.

Tyldesley has extensive archaeological fieldwork experience, having excavated in Britain, Europe and Egypt where she worked with the British Museum at Ashmunein, with the University of Liverpool in the Eastern Nile Delta, and where she conducted her own field survey at Tuna el-Gebel.

Tyldesley has been interviewed on various TV series including Empires: Egypt's Golden Empire (2001), and The Nile: Egypt's Great River with Bettany Hughes (2019).

=== Accountancy and Rutherford Press Limited ===
Tyldesley is a part-qualified Chartered Accountant, and spent 17 years supporting her writing career by working as a small business manager for Crossley and Davis Chartered Accountants in Bolton.

In 2004 Tyldesley established, with Steven Snape, Rutherford Press Limited, a publishing firm dedicated to publishing serious but accessible books on ancient Egypt while raising money for Egyptology field work. Donations from Rutherford Press Limited totalling £3,000 were made to Manchester Museum, the Egypt Exploration Society and the University of Liverpool fieldwork project at Zawyet Umm El Rakham. Rutherford Press closed in February 2017, to allow Tyldesley to concentrate on her teaching.

=== Publications ===
Tyldesley has written academic and popular books for adults and children, including books to accompany the television series Private Lives of the Pharaohs (Channel 4), Egypt's Golden Empire (Lion Television) and Egypt (BBC). In January 2008 book Cleopatra: Last Queen of Egypt, was the Book of the Week on BBC Radio 4. Her play for children, The Lost Scroll, premiered at Kendal Museum in 2011. Her book Tutankhamen's Curse was awarded the Felicia A. Holton Book Award by the Archaeological Institute of America in 2014.

=== Gender and ancient history ===
Tyldesley has written about the role of women in ancient Egypt, such as Hatshepsut, a female pharaoh, in the 18th dynasty. She has written about Egyptian women and their lives, as well as the roles of power women held in ancient societies. She has described how in ancient Egypt, women:

'enjoyed a legal, social and sexual independence unrivalled by their Greek or Roman sisters, or in fact by most women until the late nineteenth century'.

She has written about the lives of women in ancient Egypt. Tyldesley commented that she thought Hatshepsut may have been 'keenly conscious of her exceptional place in history', as there were inscriptions on a pair of obelisks erected, which said:

"Now my heart turns this way and that, as I think what the people will say—those who shall see my monuments in years to come, and who shall speak of what I have done."

Tyldesley was also on a panel, hosted by Bettany Hughes of the BBC, on how Nefertiti, Cleopatra, and Hatshepsut ruled in positions of power, and 'flipped gender roles'. The panel discussed examples of women who were able to take and hold power via 'bravery, guile... self-reinvention... and the ability to control their own image'.

=== Publications ===
Tyldesley's publications include:

- The Wolvercote Channel Handaxe Assemblage: A Comparative Study
- The Bout Coupe Biface: a Typological Problem
- Nazlet Tuna: An Archaeological Survey in Middle Egypt
- Tyldesley, J. (1995). Daughters of Isis: Women of Ancient Egypt. London: Penguin. ISBN 978-0140175967.
- Tyldesley, J. (1998). Hatshepsut: The Female Pharaoh. London: Penguin. ISBN 9780140244649. OCLC 39109151.
- Tyldesley, J. (1999). Nefertiti: Egypt's Sun Queen. London: Viking/Penguin. ISBN 978-0670869985.
- Tyldesley, J. (1999). The Mummy: Unwrap the Ancient Secrets of the Mummy's Tombs. London: Carlton Books. ISBN 978-1858687148.
- Tyldesley, J. (2000). Ramesses: Egypt's Greatest Pharaoh. London: Viking/Penguin. ISBN 978-0140280975.
- Tyldesley, J. (2000). Judgement of the Pharaoh: Crime and Punishment in Ancient Egypt. London: Weidenfeld. ISBN 978-0297646693.
- Tyldesley, J. (2000). Private Lives of the Pharaohs. London: Channel 4 books. ISBN 978-0752219035.
- Tyldesley, J. (2001). Egypt's Golden Empire: The Age of the New Kingdom. London: Headline. ISBN 978-0747251606.
- Tyldesley, J. (2004). Tales from Ancient Egypt (revised ed.). Rutherford Press Limited. ISBN 978-0954762209.
- Tyldesley, J. (2003). Pyramids: The Real Story behind Egypt's most Ancient Monuments. London: Viking/Penguin. ISBN 978-1804363690.
- Palmer, Douglas; Bahn, Paul; Tyldesley, J. (2005). Unearthing the Past. The Lyons Press. ISBN 978-1592287185.
- Egypt: How a Lost Civilization was Rediscovered
- Tyldesley, J. (2006). Chronicle of the Queens of Egypt. London: Thames & Hudson. ISBN 978-0500051450.
- Tyldesley, J. (2007). Egyptian Games and Sports. London: Shire Books. ISBN 978-0747806615.
- Tyldesley, J. (2007). Egypt (Ancient Egypt Revealed). Somerville: Templar. ISBN 978-1840117028.
- Tyldesley, J. (2007). Mummy Mysteries: The Secret World of Tutankhamun and the Pharaohs. London: Carlton Books. ISBN 978-1844428281.
- Tyldesley, J. (2010) [First published 2008]. Cleopatra: Last Queen of Egypt. London: Profile Books. ISBN 978-0465018925.
- Tyldesley, J. (2009). The Pharaohs. London: Quercus. ISBN 978-1787479005.
- Tyldesley, J. (2010). Myths and Legends of Ancient Egypt. London: Viking/Penguin. ISBN 978-1846143694.
- Tyldesley, J. (2012). Tutankhamen's Curse: The Developing History of an Egyptian King. London: Profile Books. ISBN 978-1861971661. (published in the USA as Tutankhamen)
- Tyldesley, J.; Heath, Julian (2012). Stories from Ancient Egypt: Egyptian Myths and Legends for Children. Oxford: Oxbow Books. ISBN 978-0954762216.
- Tyldesley, J. (2017). Stories from Ancient Greece and Rome. Oxford: Oxbow Books. ISBN 978-1785707650.
- Tyldesley, J. (2018). Nefertiti's Face: The Creation of an Icon. Profile Books. ISBN 978-1781250518.
- Tyldesley, J.; Nielsen, Nicky (2020). From Mummies to Microchips. Milton Park: Routledge. ISBN 978-0367516864.

=== Awards and honours ===
Tyldesley was appointed Officer of the Order of the British Empire (OBE) in the 2024 New Year Honours for services to Egyptology and heritage. Other awards include:

- 2014 - Felicia A. Holton Book Award from the Archaeological Institute of America
- 2019 - Outstanding Technology Enhanced Learning Award
- 2011 - Tyldesley was awarded an honorary doctorate by the University of Bolton in recognition of her contribution to education.

== Personal life ==
Tyldesley has two children.
