= Women in ancient Egypt =

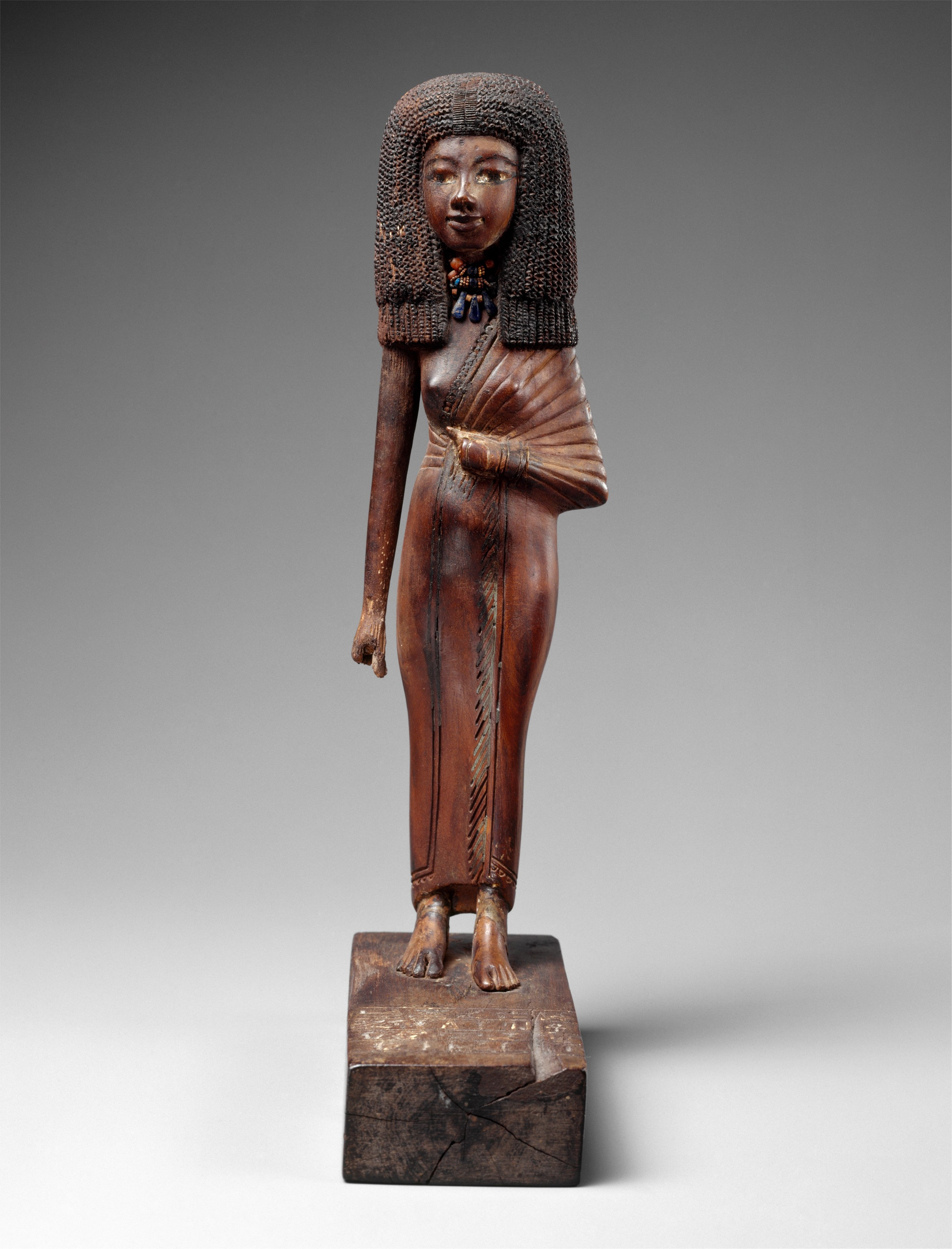
Statuette of the lady Tiye

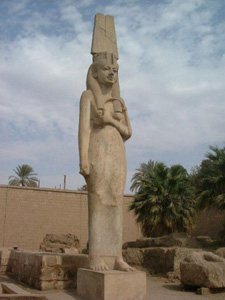
Queen Meritamen statue at Akhmim.

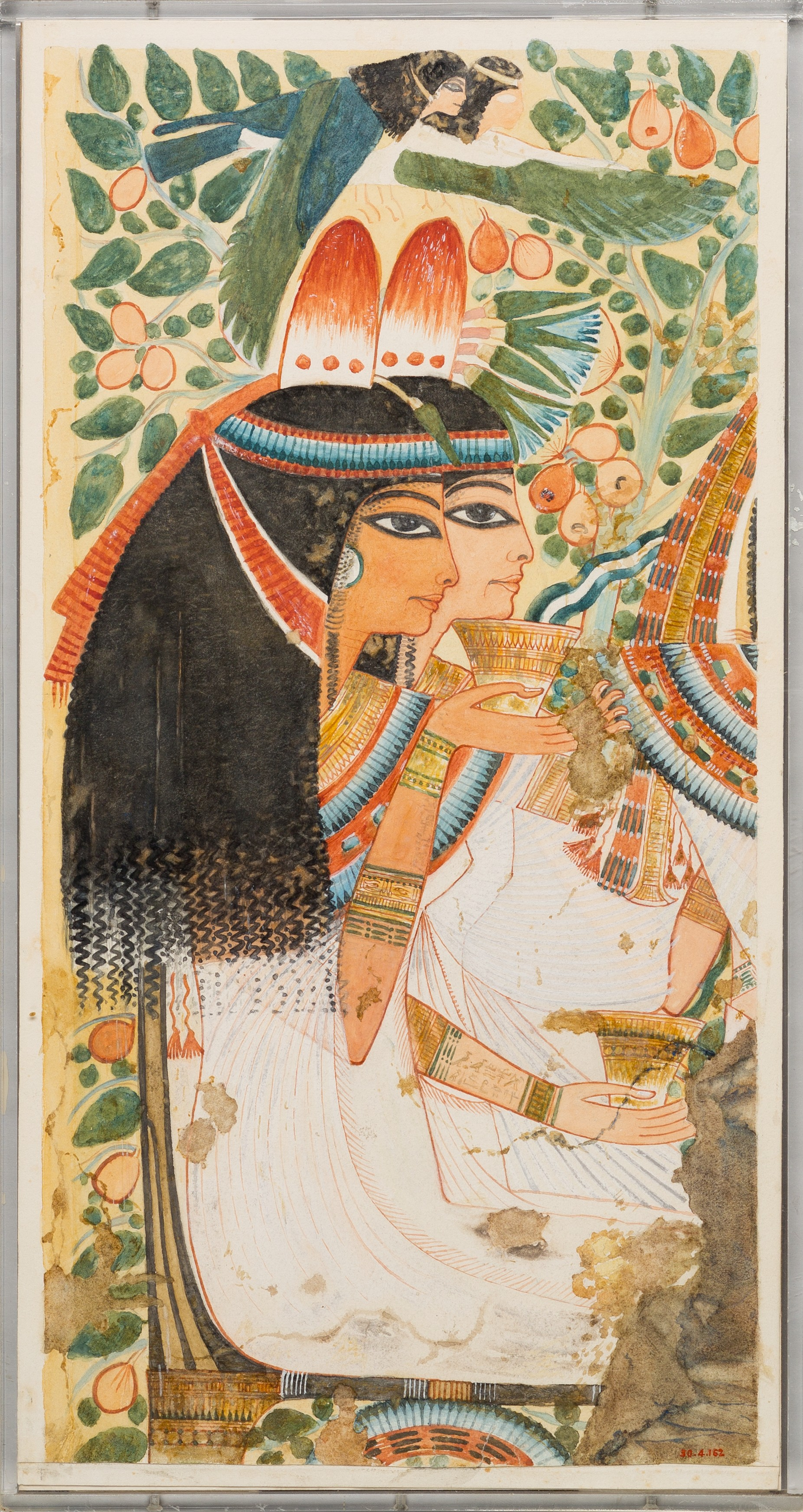
The wife and mother of the nobleman Userhat depicted receiving offerings, tomb of Userhat (TT51)

Women in ancient Egypt had some special rights other women did not have in other comparable societies. They could own property and were, at court, legally equal to men. However, Ancient Egypt was a patriarchal society dominated by men. Only a few women are known to have held important positions in administration, though there were female rulers and even female pharaohs. Women at the royal court gained their positions by relationships to male kings.

== Work ==
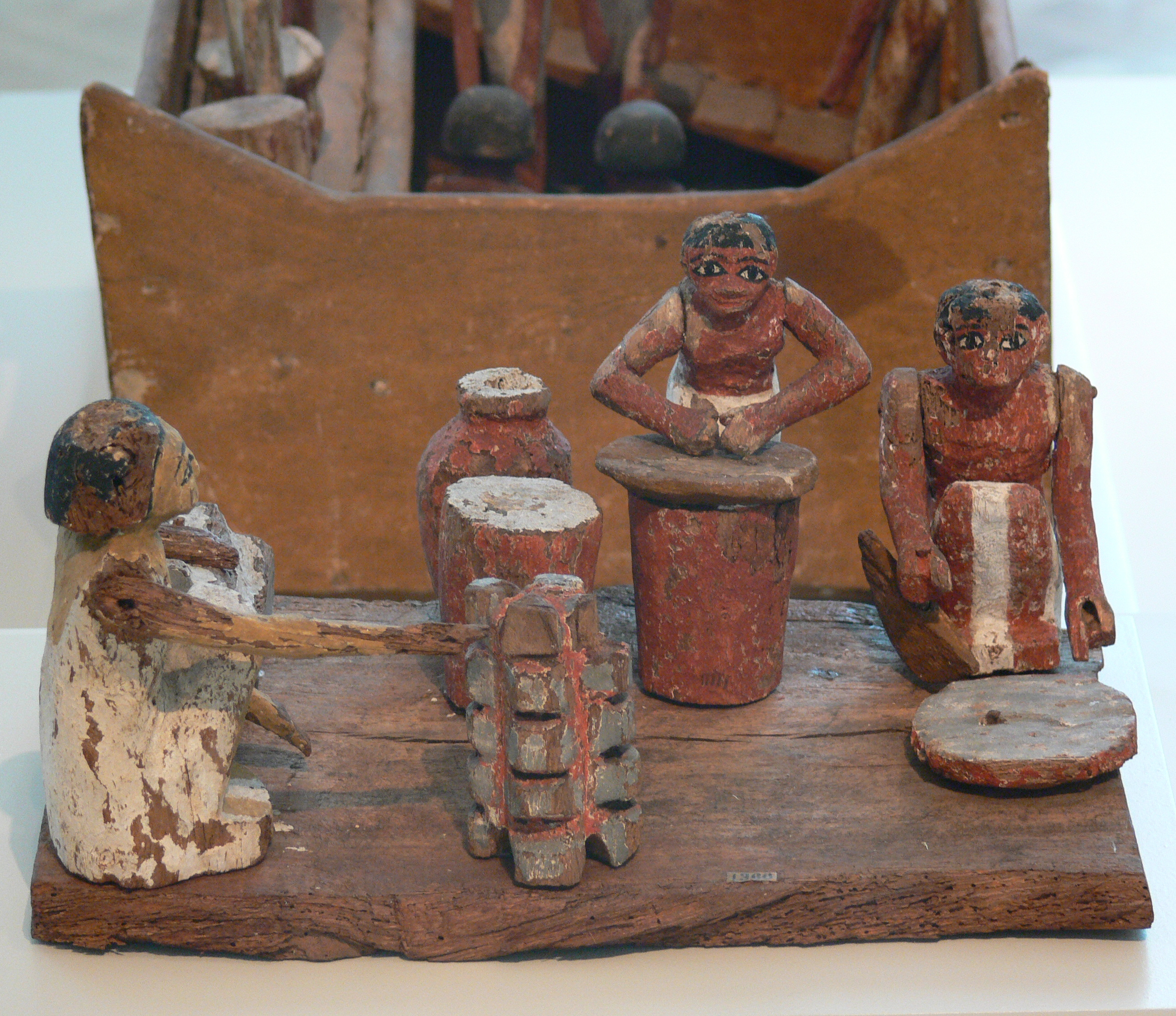
Kitchen model; women workers grinding, baking, and brewing. Bread- and beer-making (made of fermented bread) were usually women's tasks. Twelfth dynasty of Egypt, 2050-1800 BCE. Egyptian Museum of Berlin.

Most women belonged to the peasantry and worked alongside their husbands. Women were known to manage farms or businesses in the absence of their husbands or sons. Among the upper classes of society, a woman usually did not work outside the home, and instead supervised the servants of the household and her children's education. An exception is the textile industry. Here women are well attested as weavers. A letter found at Lahun and dating around 1800 BC names six female weavers.

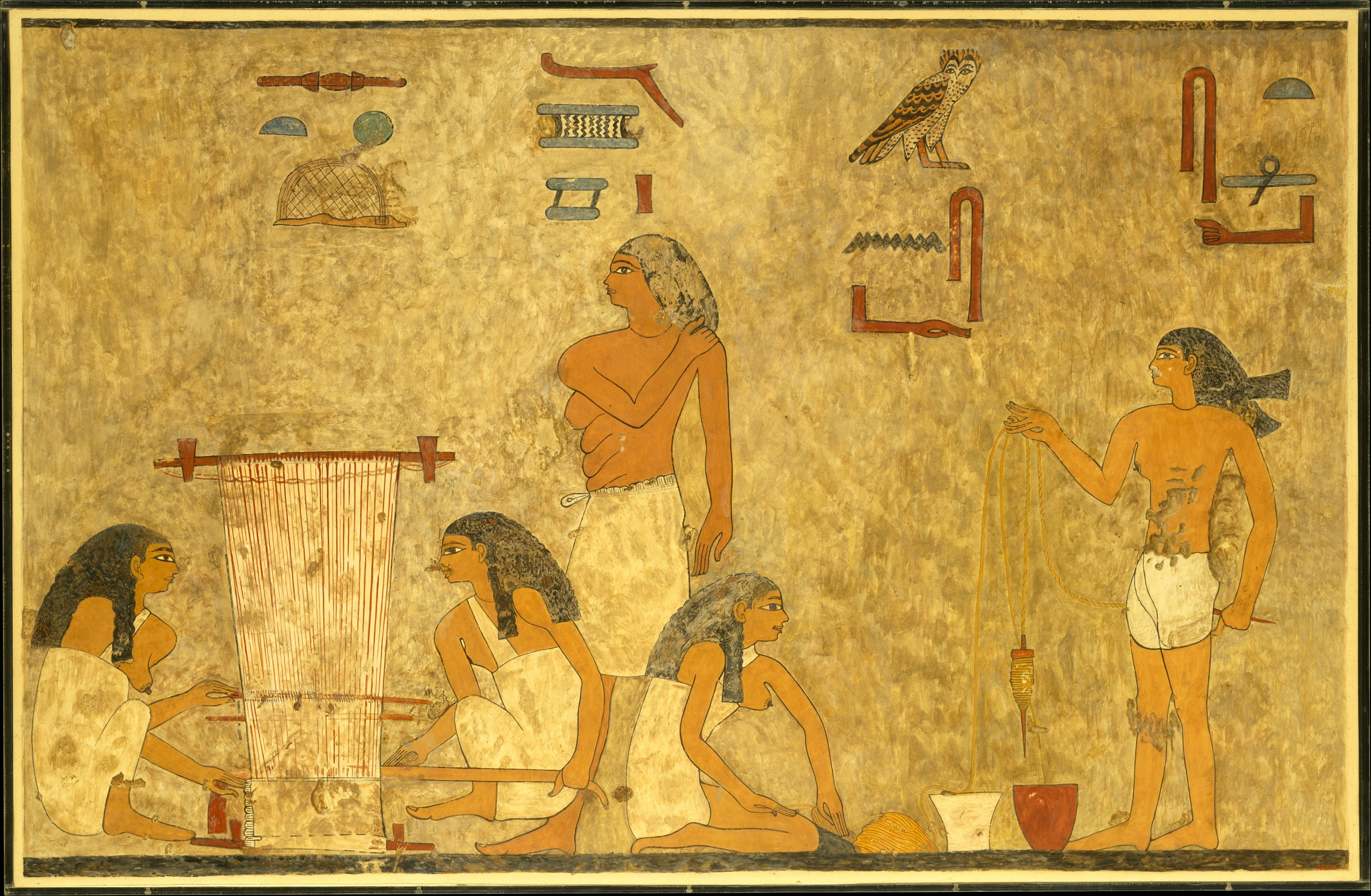
Female weavers from Tomb of Khnumhotep circa 1897–1878 B.C. Period:Middle Kingdom Dynasty:12th dynasty Reign: reign of Senwosret II

In the Old Kingdom wealthy women often owned their own households. There were working men and women side by side, and it is not uncommon to find in the staff of a women's household other women with administrative titles. Especially in tomb scenes of the periods, men are often served by men, while women are served by women. Here, the separation of sexes is visible.

Women belonging to families wealthy enough to hire nannies to help with childcare frequently worked as perfume-makers and also were employed in courts and temples, like acrobats, dancers, singers, and musicians, which were all considered respectable pursuits for upper-class women. Women belonging to any class could work as professional mourners or musicians, and these were common jobs. Noblewomen could be members of the priesthood connected to either a god or goddess. Women could even be at the head of a business as, for example, the lady Nenofer of the New Kingdom, and could also be a doctor, as the lady Peseshet during the Fourth dynasty of Egypt.

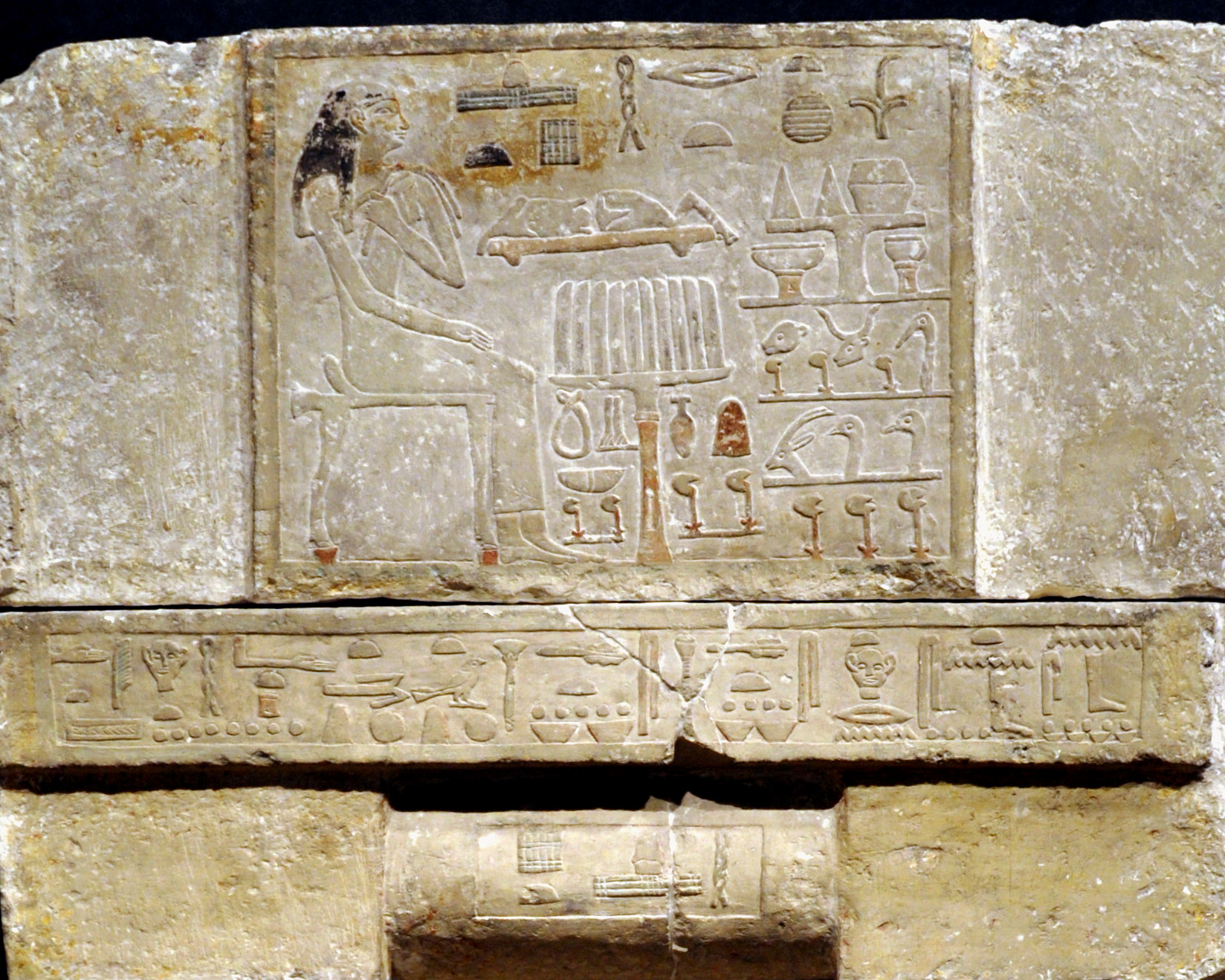
Hetpet (priestess of Hathor), old kingdom, 5th dynasty

== Family and marriage ==
=== Marriage ===
The purpose of marriage was to have more children and descendants of the family.

In the New Kingdom, there was a saying that:

"Take a wife while you are young That she make a son for you She should care for you while you are youthful It is proper to make people Happy is the man whose people are many He is saluted on account of his progeny."

It is true that some egalitarian relationships between husband and wife were implied in Egyptian depictions.

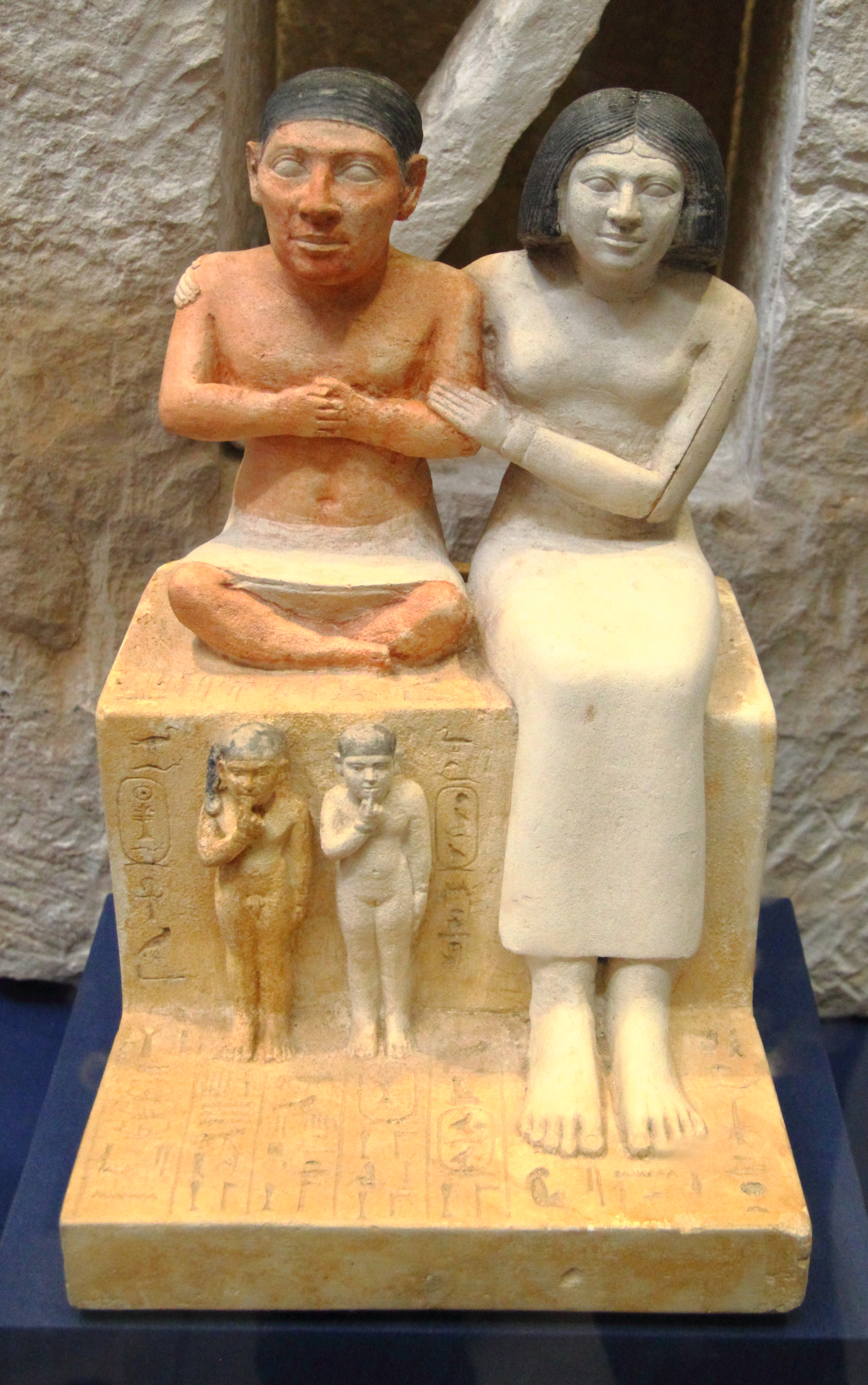
Seneb and his wife Senetites

For example, in love songs, brother and sister carried the same significance as husband and wife. "Sn", the Egyptian word for "brother", also meant "peer", "mate", or "second". Thus, the love songs may be referring to the egalitarian relationship between husband and wife. The example for inbreeding among royalty was set by the gods since Osiris married his sister, Isis.

However, depictions usually show a husband and wife in an affectionate attitude with their children, so we assume most families were generally happy, but marriage was more realistic. The wife shared responsibilities and worked with her husband. Marriages in ancient Egypt were usually exclusive, but it also was not uncommon for a man of high economic status to have more than one wife. This was especially true if the man's first wife was unable to have children of her own. Although it was possible to divorce, it was very difficult. Marriages were usually arranged by parents, who chose appropriate partners for their children. Despite what the laws stated, it was suggested that women made more family decisions and controlled more of the home than usual. Women had control over most of their property, could serve as legal persons who brought cases to the court, and even worked in public. Husbands did not take total control over their wives property because women had a degree of independence in ancient Egypt. For example, from ca. 365 B.C, a new marriage contract was emerged which mainly protected women from divorce, placing more financial burdens on men.

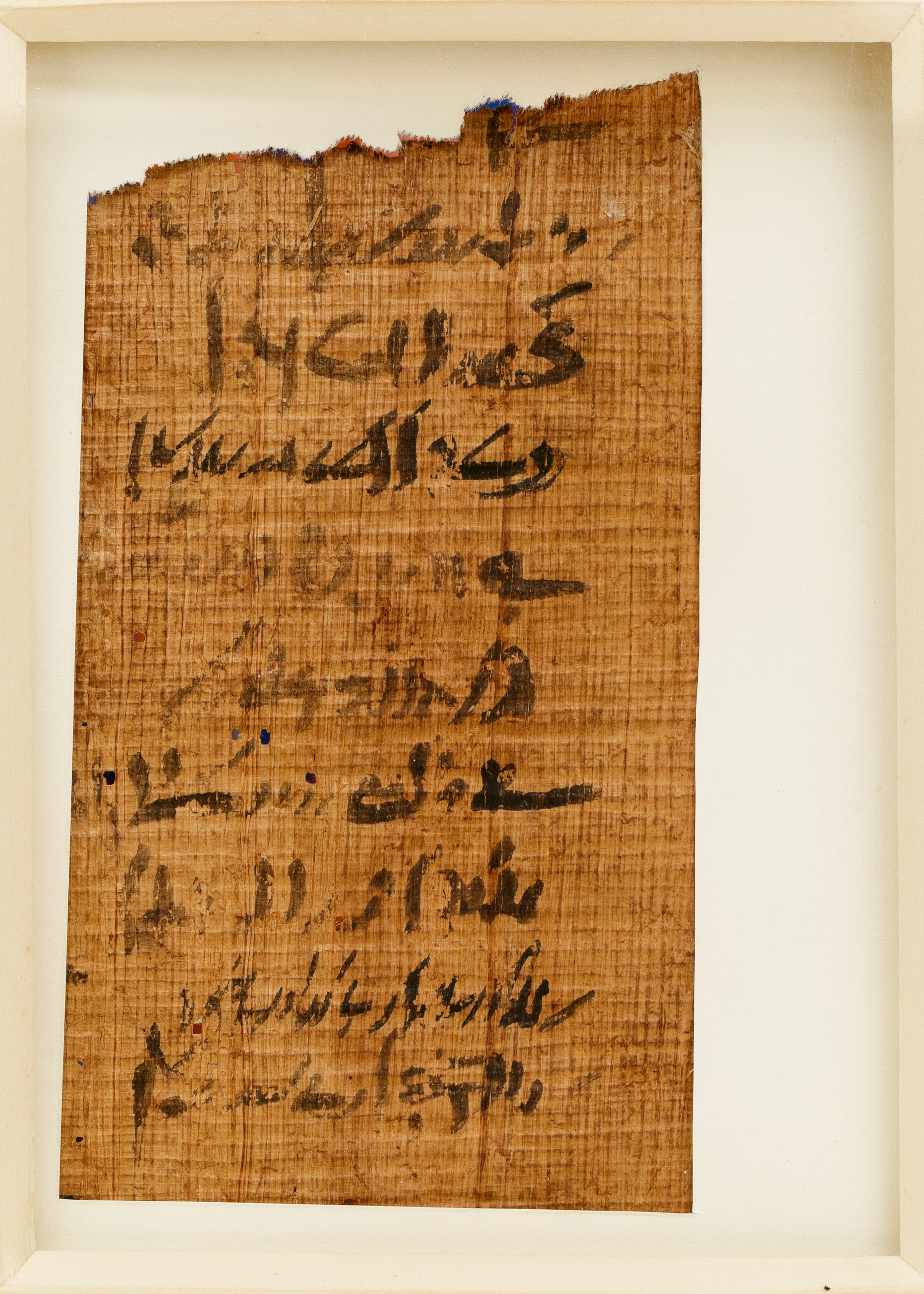
A marriage contract from Ancient Egypt from thirtieth dynasty Date: 380–343 B.C. at Metropolitan museum.

The influence of queens and queen mothers was considered as a big reason for women's special rights in ancient Egypt compared to other contemporary societies. Queens and queen mothers often had a great power since many pharaohs were very young when they succeeded the throne. For example, the pharaoh Ahmose I in New Kingdom, took advice from his mother, Ahhotep I, and his principal wife, Nefertari.

Although the women of ancient Egypt were viewed as one of the most independent groups of women, widowhood could result in suspicion due to the lack of male control. Widows also gained more legal freedom, being able to buy and sell land, making donations, and even making loans.

=== Pregnancy and reproduction ===
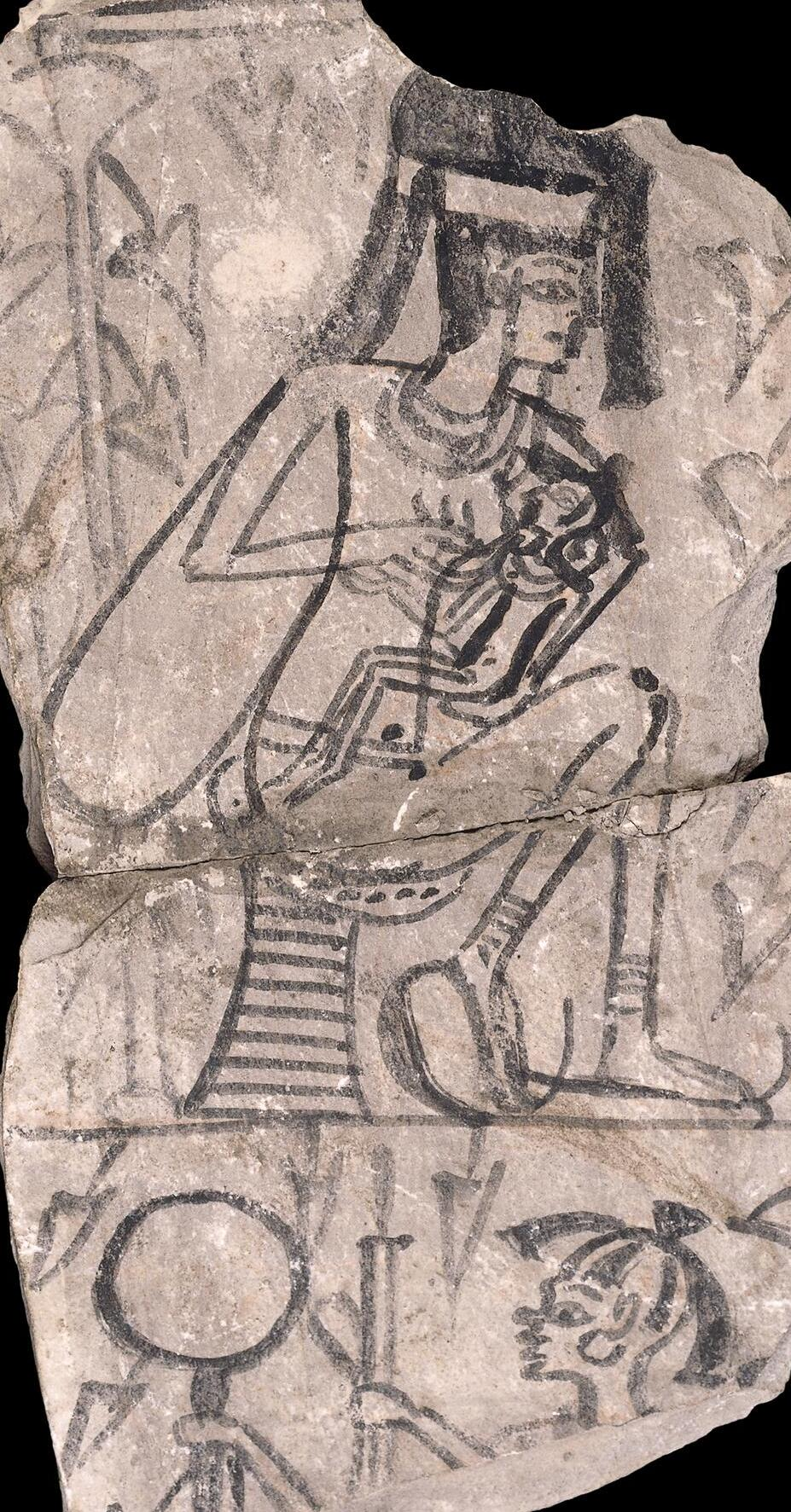
Ramesside Ostraca with woman breastfeeding baby

There is much evidence of complex beliefs and practices in ancient Egypt related to the important role fertility played in society. If a woman was infertile, her husband could potentially divorce her for not producing heirs. Religious beliefs included rules concerning purification, similar to other religions in the region. Women in Egypt were believed to be eliminating impure elements during menstruation, and were excused from work and could not enter the restricted rooms of temples while menstruating. Fertility rituals were used by couples desiring children. Contraception was permitted as well, and medical texts survive that refer to many contraceptive formulas (although the ingredients are often now difficult to identify). Some formulas, such as drinks made of celery base and beer, are dubious, but others show a basic knowledge of somewhat effective methods, such as a spermicide made of fermented acacia gum, which produces a sperm-killing lactic acid.

Once a woman became pregnant, her uterus was placed under the protection of the goddess Tenenet. Ritual medical care was given by anointing the woman's body with beneficial oils, using a small bottle in the form of a woman posed with her hands placed on a round belly.

Families who wanted to know the sex of their baby sometimes placed grains of barley and wheat in a cloth sachet and soaked them in the pregnant woman's urine; if barley sprouted first, the baby was said to be a boy, and if the wheat sprouted first, the baby was said to be a girl. In ancient Egypt, the word for barley was the synonym of "father." The method spread to Greece, Byzantium, and then to Europe, where it was practiced for centuries before its Egyptian origins were discovered.

=== Childbirth ===
During childbirth, the pregnant woman was assisted by midwives. She would be shaved, including her head. The midwives supported the woman during labor while she remained in a squatting position on a mat. On the corners of the mat were placed four bricks, believed to be the incarnation of four goddesses: Nut, the great goddess of the sky; Tefnut, the elder, the feminine polarity of the first couple; Aset the beautiful; and Nebet-Het, the excellent.

== Women playing an official role at the highest levels ==
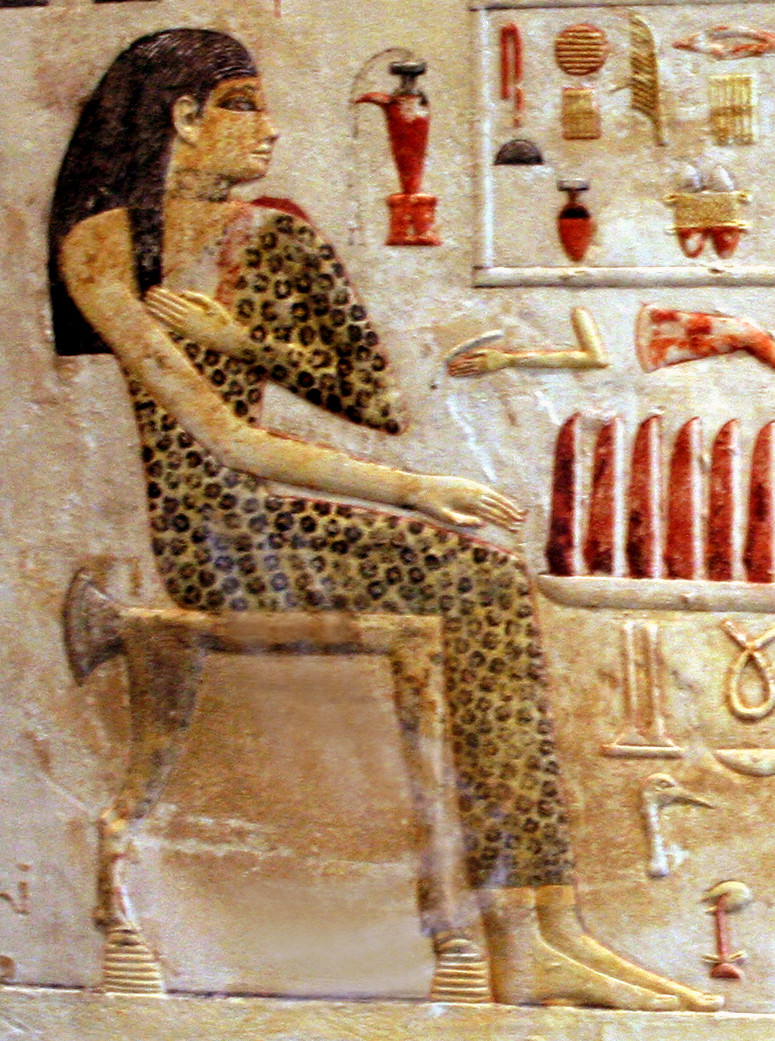
Old Kingdom Egyptian princess Nefertiabet (dated 2590-2565 BCE) from her tomb at Giza, painting on limestone, now in the Louvre

There are few preserved examples of women as high officials. Some women are known to have become Pharaohs. One example of a woman in a high state position is Nebet who became vizier in the Sixth Dynasty. The vizier was the highest state official, second only to the king.

Egyptian society of antiquity, like many other civilizations of the time, used religion as a foundation for society. Pharaohs were considered to have been anointed by the gods, and the holder of the throne had a divine right. Typically, in ancient societies power was transferred from one male to the next. Women gave birth to the heirs, signaling importance towards marriage, as well. The son inherited the power, and in cases where the king did not have a son, the throne was then inherited by the male members of the family further removed from the king, such as cousins or uncles. In this system, daughters did not automatically inherit power.

Egyptian civilization also passed power to male successors, with some exceptions. Royal blood, a factor determined by divine legitimacy, was the unique criteria for access to the throne. However, the divine essence was transmitted to the royal spouse, as was the case with Nefertiti, wife of Akhenaten.

Egyptians preferred to be governed by a woman with royal blood (being divine according to mythology) rather than by a man who did not have royal blood. Also, during crises of succession, there were women who took power. When this happened, the female Pharaoh adopted all of the masculine symbols of the throne. There even exist doubts, in some instances, about the sex of certain Pharaohs who could have been women.

During the Eighteenth dynasty of Egypt, when Amenhotep I died, his successor Thutmose I appears to have not been his son, at least he was not the child of a secondary wife of the late Pharaoh; if his wife Ahmes was related to Amenhotep I, this union permitted divine legitimacy. For the following successor, princess Hatshepsut, daughter of Thutmose I and the Great Royal Wife, enabled Thutmose II, son of his second wife and therefore half-brother of the princess, to gain the throne by marrying him.

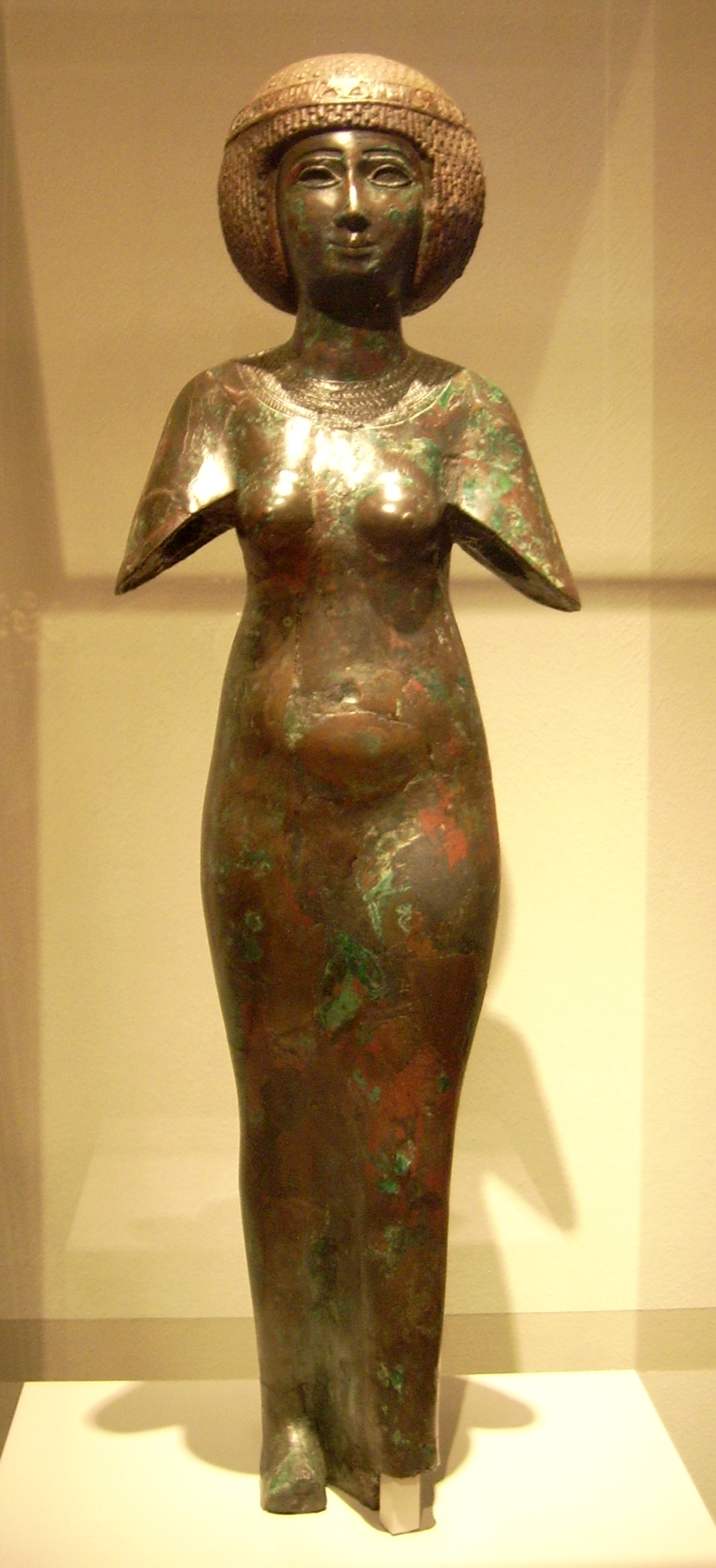
A bronze statue of a Divine Adoratrice of Amun, from the Twenty-second dynasty of Egypt, in the Egyptian Museum of Berlin.

It became more common for women to gain the throne in ancient Egypt, as with Hatshepsut, who took the place of her nephew Thutmose III. When Hatshepsut inherited the throne from her late husband and became Pharaoh, her daughter Neferure took on a role that exceeded the normal duties of a royal princess, acquiring a more queenly role. Most surviving representations of Hatshepsut, she was depicted as a male king to respect Egyptian tradition as well as to gain the respect of her people. There were also the Cleopatras, of whom the best known is Cleopatra VII (69 BCE to 30 BCE), famous for her beauty and her relationships with Julius Caesar and then Marc Antony, the leaders who depended upon her throne.

Women who are confirmed to rule in their own right as female pharaohs were:

- Sobekneferu (Twelfth dynasty of Egypt)
- Hatshepsut (Eighteenth dynasty of Egypt)
- Neferneferuaten (Eighteenth dynasty of Egypt)
- Tausret (Nineteenth dynasty of Egypt)
- Cleopatra II (Ptolemaic dynasty)
- Cleopatra III (Ptolemaic dynasty)
- Berenice III (Ptolemaic dynasty)
- Cleopatra V/VI (Ptolemaic dynasty)
- Berenice IV (Ptolemaic dynasty)
- Cleopatra VII (Ptolemaic dynasty)

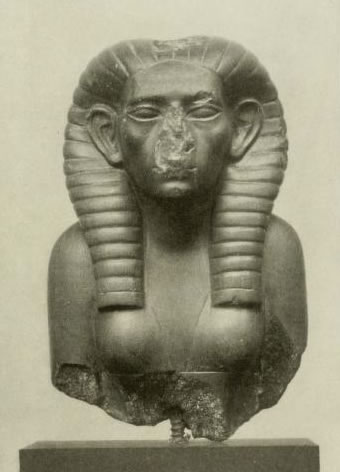
Statue of Sobekneferu, first known female Pharaoh. Berlin Egyptian Museum 14475, (c. 1760–c. 1756 BCE)

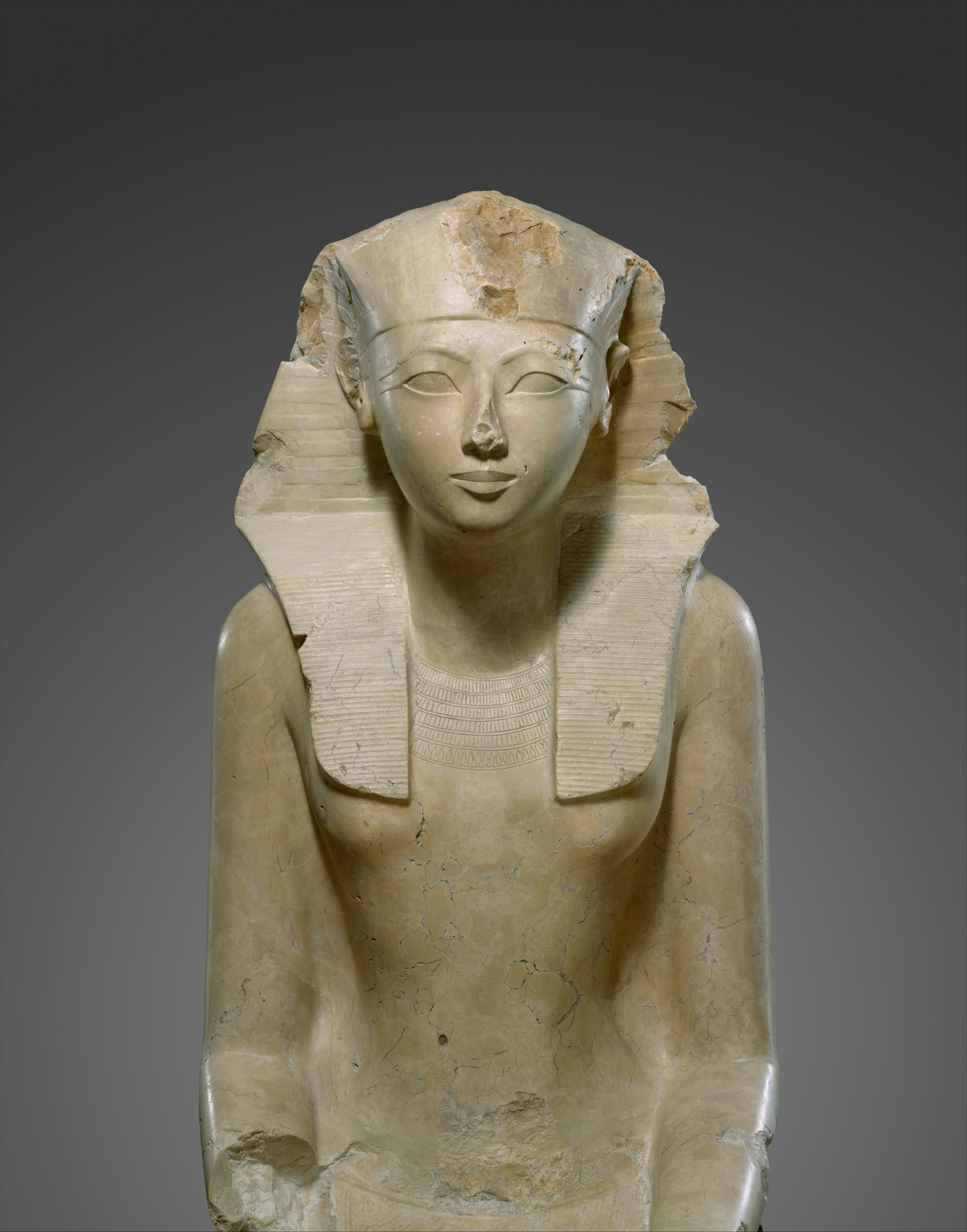
Statue of Hatshepsut, Metropolitan Museum of Art, (c. 1479–c. 1458 BCE)

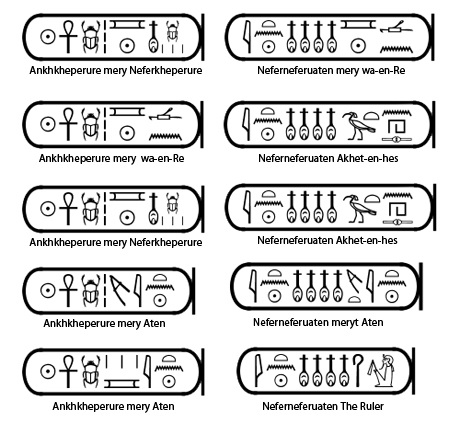
The prenomen (left column) and nomen (right column) forms for Ankhkheperure Neferneferuaten

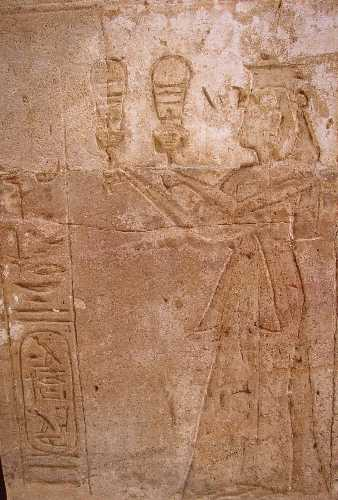
Pharaoh Tausret holding two sistrums at Amada Temple, Nubia, (1191–1189 BCE)

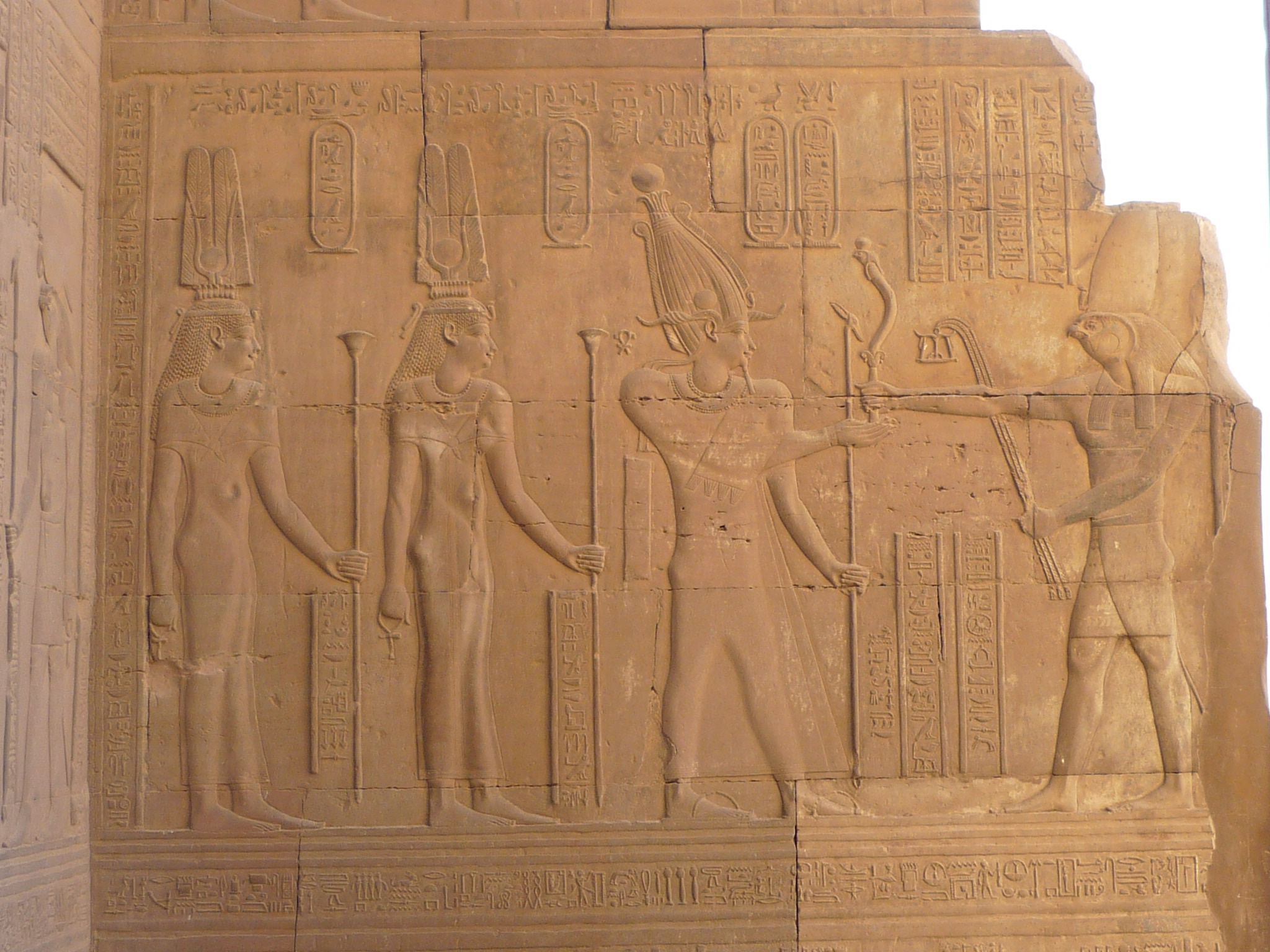
Pharaohs Cleopatra II and Cleopatra III with their husband and co-ruler Ptolemy VIII.

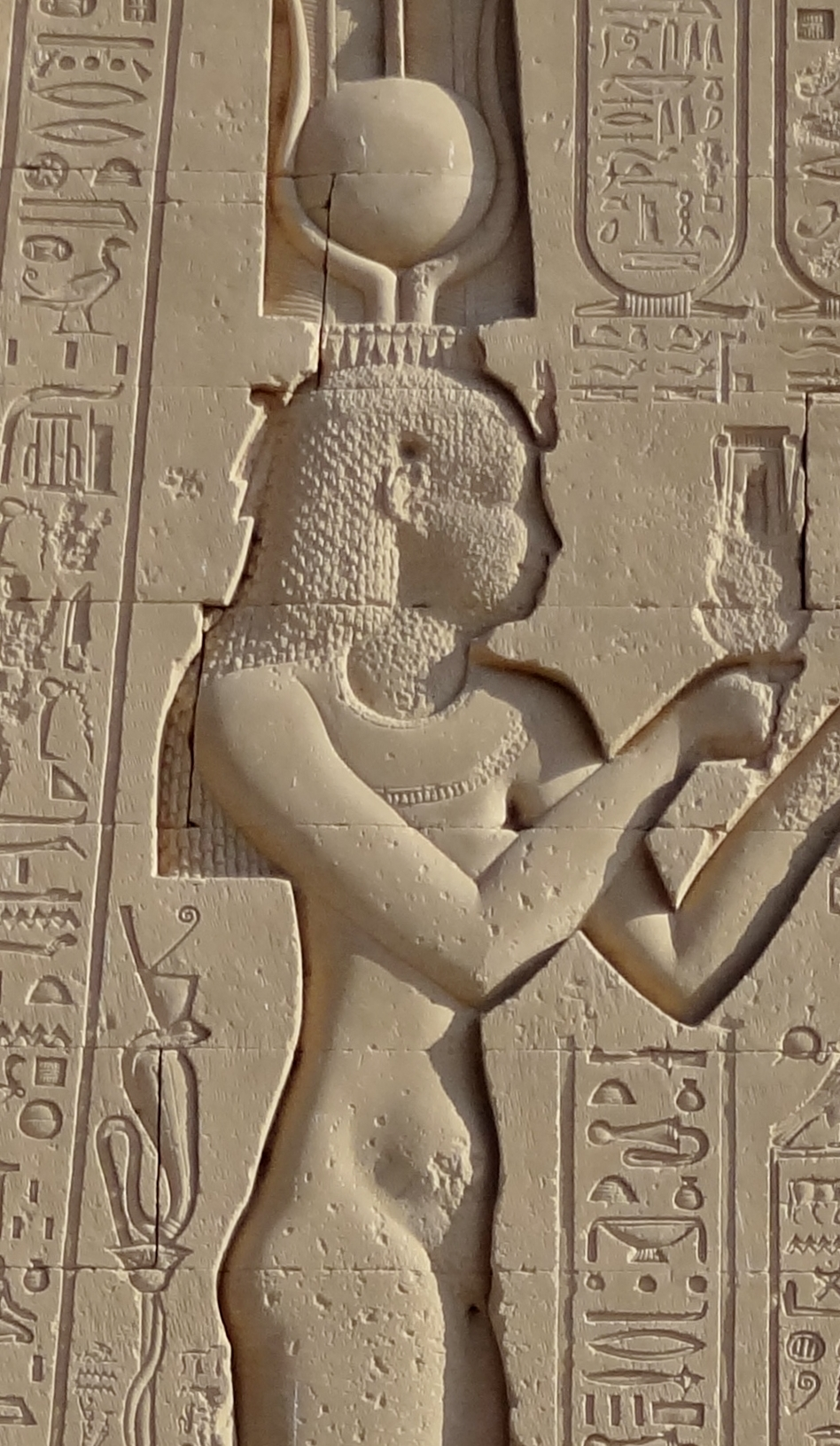
Cleopatra VII, the last female Pharaoh, depicted at the wall of Dendera temple (44/30 BC).

Many of the Great Royal Wives also played significant diplomatic and political roles:

- Tiye, wife of Amenhotep III
- Nefertiti, wife of Amenhotep IV
- Nefertari, wife of Ramesses II

Elsewhere in the New Kingdom, the Great Wife was often invested with a divine role: "Wife of god", "Hand of god". Hatshepsut was the first Great wife (of Thutmose II) to receive this latter title.

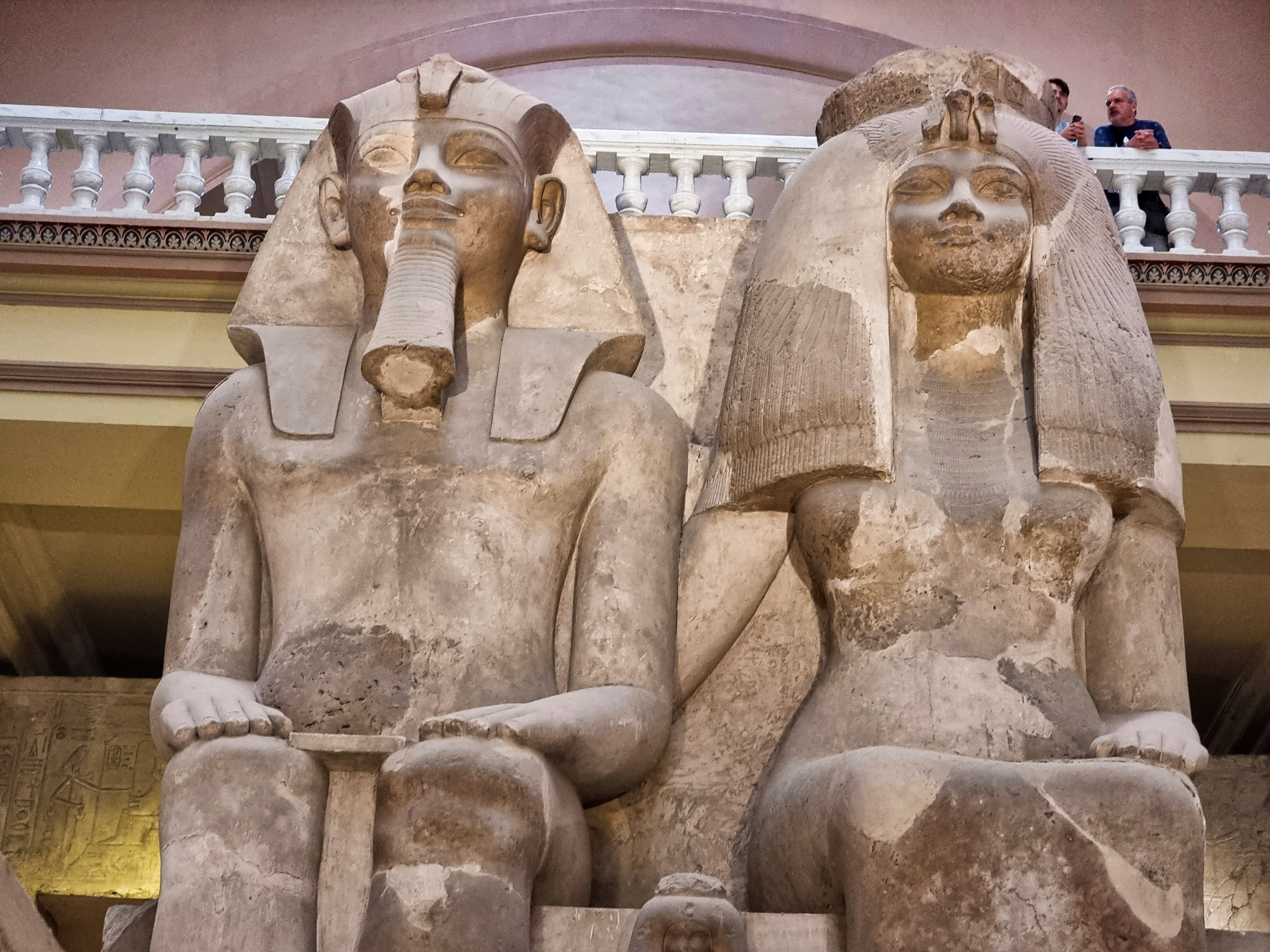
Colossal statue of Amenhotep III and Queen Tiye, 1387-1350 BCE; Egyptian Museum, Cairo

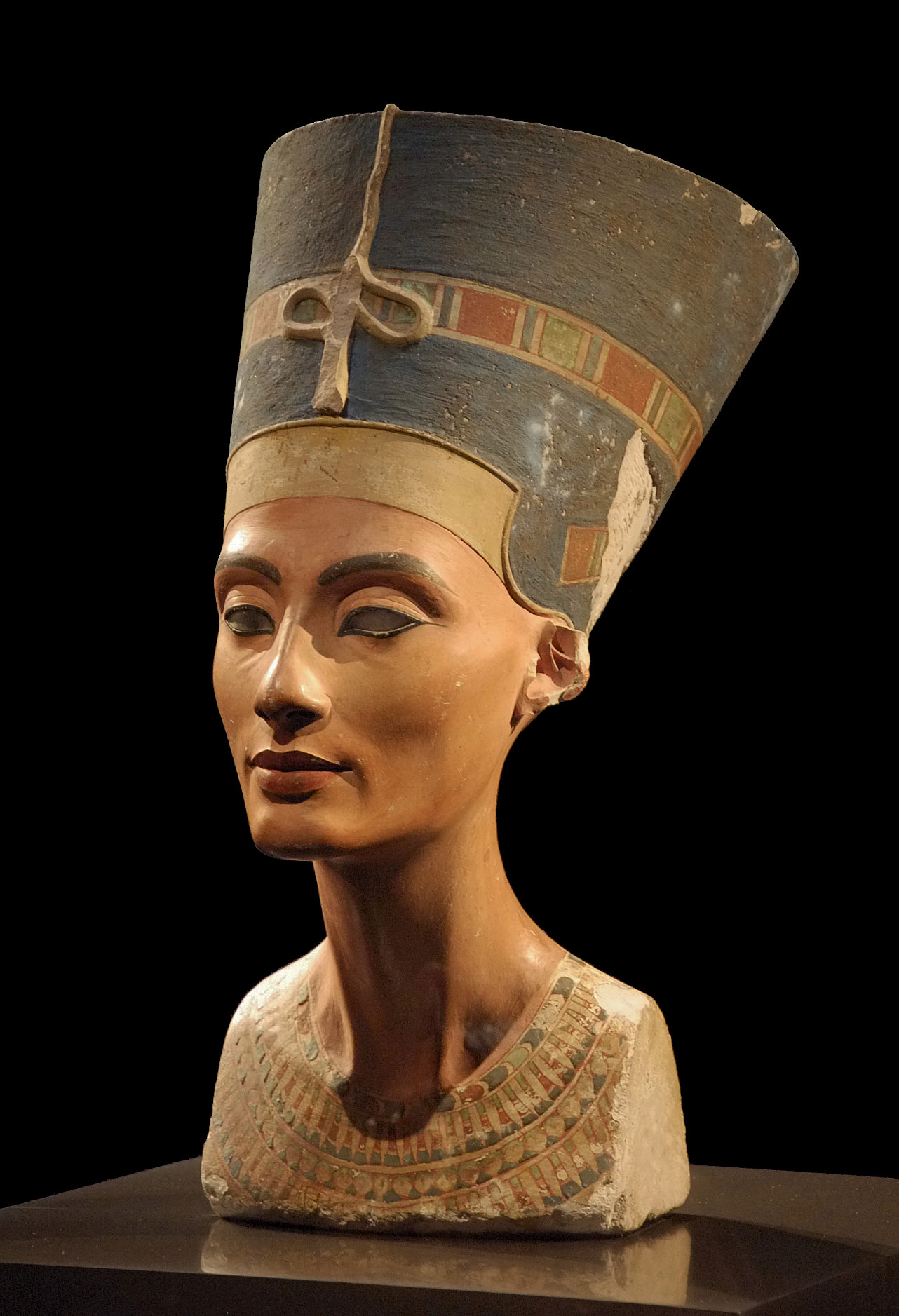
Nefertiti bust at Neues Museum, Berlin.

For women holding office in the highest levels of the bureaucracy, one can cite Nebet, a Vizier in ancient Egypt during the Sixth dynasty of Egypt. It is necessary to recognize that a woman at such a high level of authority remained extremely rare and it was not until the Twenty-sixth dynasty of Egypt that a similar situation can be found. Women did, however, occupy numerous offices such as scribe in the bureaucracy, except during the New Kingdom, where all public bureaucracy posts were filled by men.

There was also the Divine Adoratrice of Amun, granted major spiritual power, but also a power restricted to Thebes.

=== "Royal harem" ===
There has been a modern trend to refer to the women's quarters of the Pharaoh's palace in Ancient Egypt as a harem, though this is an anachronism. While the women and children of the pharaoh, including his mother, wives, and children, had their own living quarters with its own administration in the Palace of the Pharaoh, the royal women did not live isolated from contact with men or in seclusion from the rest of the court in the way associated with the term "harem".

The custom of referring to the women's quarters of the pharaoh's palace as a "harem" is therefore apocryphal, and has been used because of incorrect assumptions that Ancient Egypt was similar to later Islamic harem culture.

== Women in ancient Egyptian literature ==
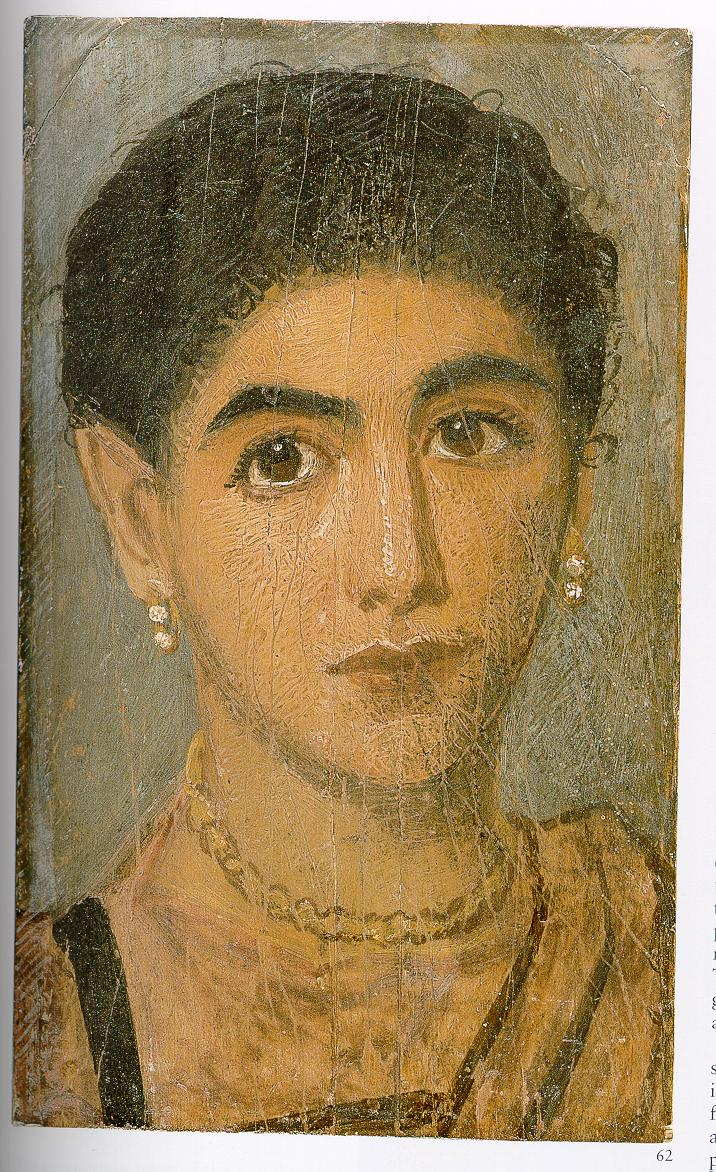
Fayum mummy portrait, circa 100-200 CE, Louvre Museum, Paris.

Literature of ancient Egypt did include depictions of women as frivolous, capricious, and untrustworthy. However, women benefitted from a status that has been described as rare in the civilizations of the time.

The ancient pharaoh Hatshepsut was regarded as a female in literature through pronouns, yet maintained authority due to her masculine representation in both literature and art; depicting her as a powerful leader and fierce warrior.

While the painters and sculptors gave to women a serene image as part of a happy family, writers sometimes portrayed women as being the origin of misfortune and guilty of sins.

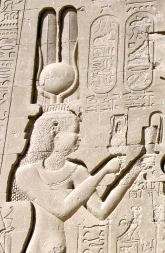
Cleopatra VII, the last female Pharaoh, on rear wall of Dendera Temple

In Contes populaires (Popular Tales), Gaston Maspero describes the fatal misadventure of Bytaou, the humble farmhand at the home of his brother Anoupou. Seduced by the wife of his brother, he succumbs to the charm of her beauty. She does not hesitate to denounce him to Anoupou, lying and never ceasing until she obtains the ultimate punishment for Bytaou at the hands of Anoupou. But she is punished in turn; Anoupou discovers much later that he had been fooled by his wife, whom he kills, and throws her body to the dogs.

It is important not to interpret this incorrectly: the rarely flattering portrayal of women in Egyptian literature does not reveal for nothing that women were despised. The Pharaoh was often given the same treatment by storytellers who presented the Pharaoh as a stubborn and whimsical character.

Men were invited to cherish their wives. Ptahhotep (Third dynasty of Egypt) expressed this in the following maxim (written in the Papyrus Prisse): "You must love your wife with all your heart, [...], make her heart happy as long as you live".

Romance was present in Egyptian literature, for example, in a papyrus at the Leyden Museum:

I took you for my wife when I was a young man. I was with you. Then I conquered all ranks, but I never abandoned you. I have never made your heart suffer. Here is what I have done when I was a young man and I exercised all the high functions of Pharaoh, Life, Health, Strength, I never abandoned you, saying to the contrary: "That it was by being with you!" [...] My perfumes, cakes and clothes, I did not bring them to another dwelling. [...] When you became ill, I made myself an official of health and did whatever was necessary. [...] When I joined Memphis, I asked for a holiday as Pharaoh, I went to the place where you dwell (your tomb) and I wept deeply. [...] I will not enter another house. [...] But, here are the sisters who are in the house, I did not go to any of them.

In ancient literature written by men, Egyptian women were not portrayed talking with one another. This makes it difficult to find information about real women due to the scarcity of fully fleshed literary sources. However, because of their high status, people are aware of women's presence in the royal house due to archaeologically preserved monuments as well as entombments. Much of the relevant data revolves on the role as a spouse. If the man was a Pharaoh, the wife is more likely to be shown in records, such as literature or monuments, as opposed to a common woman. In most cases, it is uncommon for an Egyptian queen to not have a partner as Pharaoh; however, it had previously been achieved by the female Pharaoh Hatshepsut. Given her marital status to Thutmose II before his death in 1479 BC, researchers have more data on her rule as opposed to normal queens.

== Women in ancient Egyptian art ==
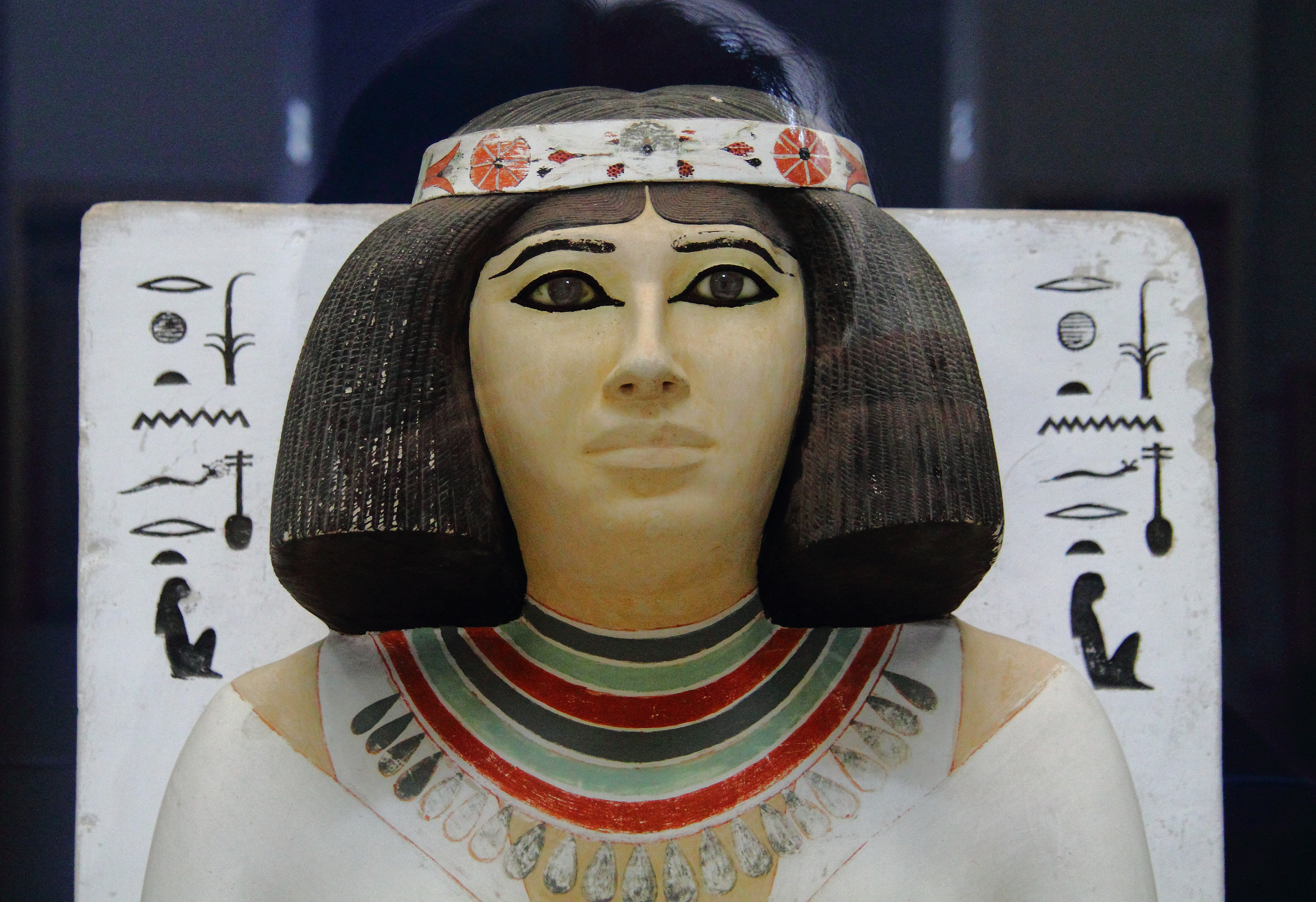
statue of princess Nofret, Old Kingdom of Egypt (dated 2590-2565 BCE)

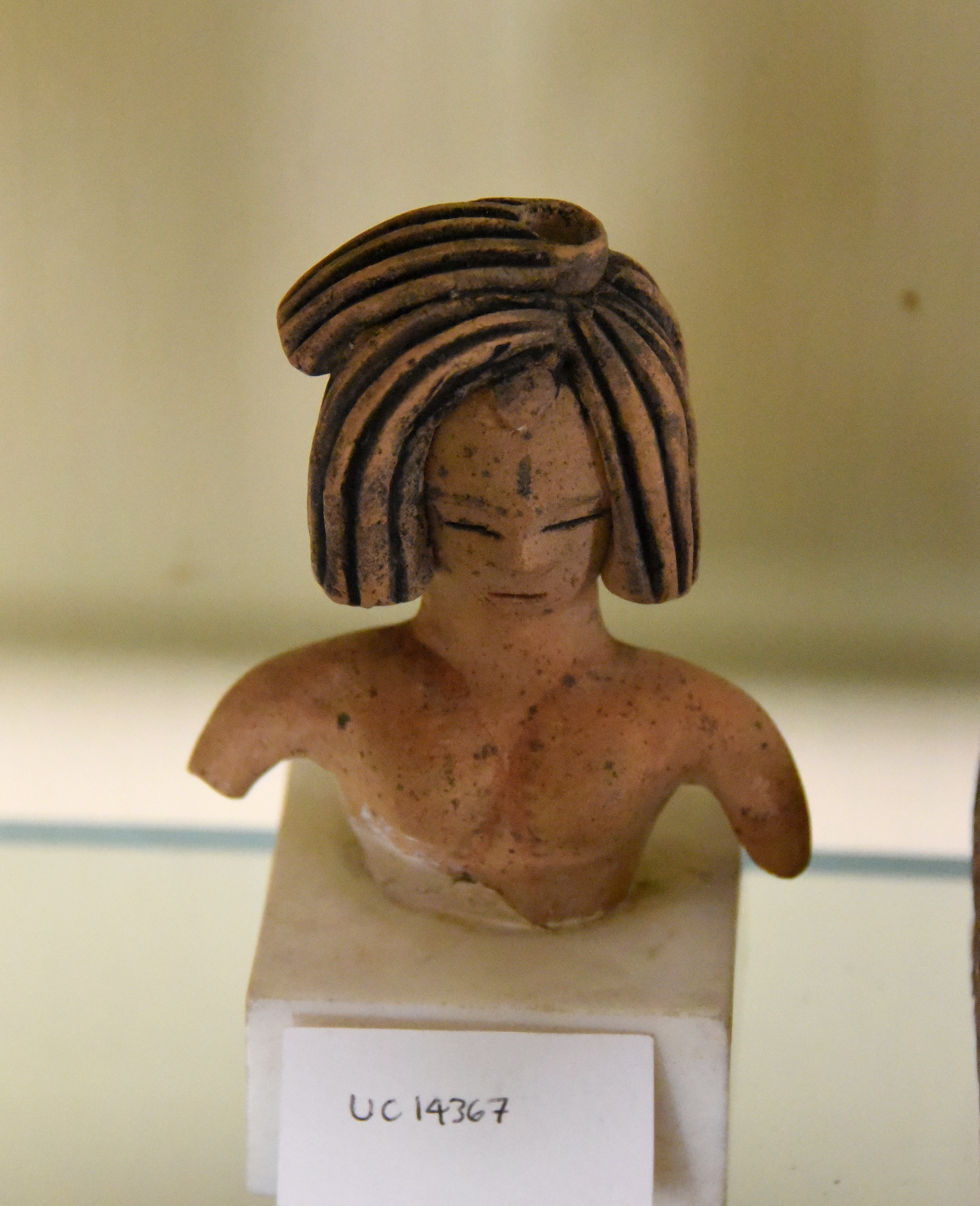
Upper torso of a woman's figurine. Slit eyes and mouth. She wears an elaborate headdress. Pottery fragment. Ramesside period. From Egypt. The Petrie Museum of Egyptian Archaeology, London

Egyptian women were seldom depicted as ageing and wrinkled; there were standards to be met. The women were shown as slender and beautiful, partly so that they could take on that frame in the afterlife. Egyptian art was far from realistic. It shows how much the ancient Egyptians cared about how they were perceived. There were hardly any images of pregnant women or women's bodies after giving birth. The man, however, could be shown as athletic and engaging or old and experienced. These idealistic depictions would reflect the targeted image, such as the physically able king, or the tired king who works day and night for his people. People were depicted at the peak of their beauty and youth, in an attempt to remain so forever. However, in the Third Intermediate Period, scholars see a shifting in the artistic style representing women. A more rounded body type appeared, with larger, more drooping breasts and a thickened body. This depiction was no longer necessarily associated with the ageing of women. There was also a certain "type" to be followed. Women, and children, were represented with an artistic style that would link them to their husband or father. The most obvious example would be the Amarna Period. Akhenaten's Amarna Period hosted great changes in artistic style. However, the most distinctive part was how Nefertiti, his wife, and his children were shown with the same body type as his, which was quite unique for that matter. There are depictions showing Nefertiti with a body so similar to Akhenaten's, that it was difficult to tell them apart; their depictions both contain long chins, round waists, full buttocks, sunken cheekbones and full lips. But there are also other depictions showing Nefertiti completely different, with a feminine face and a slender shape. After the Amarna Period, elite women were occasionally shown with fuller breasts.

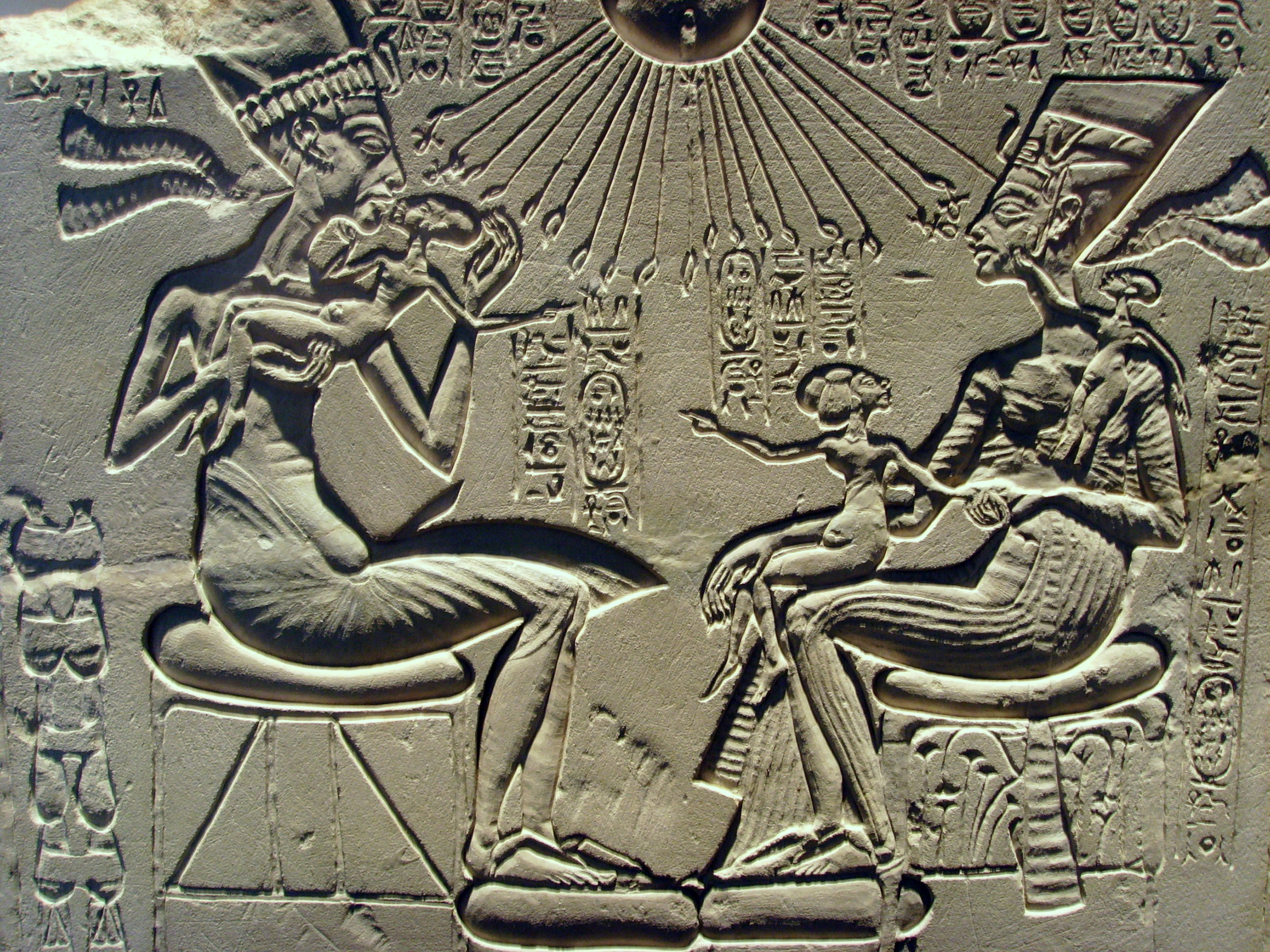
Nefertiti with body similar to Akhenaten 's

== Divine image and religion ==
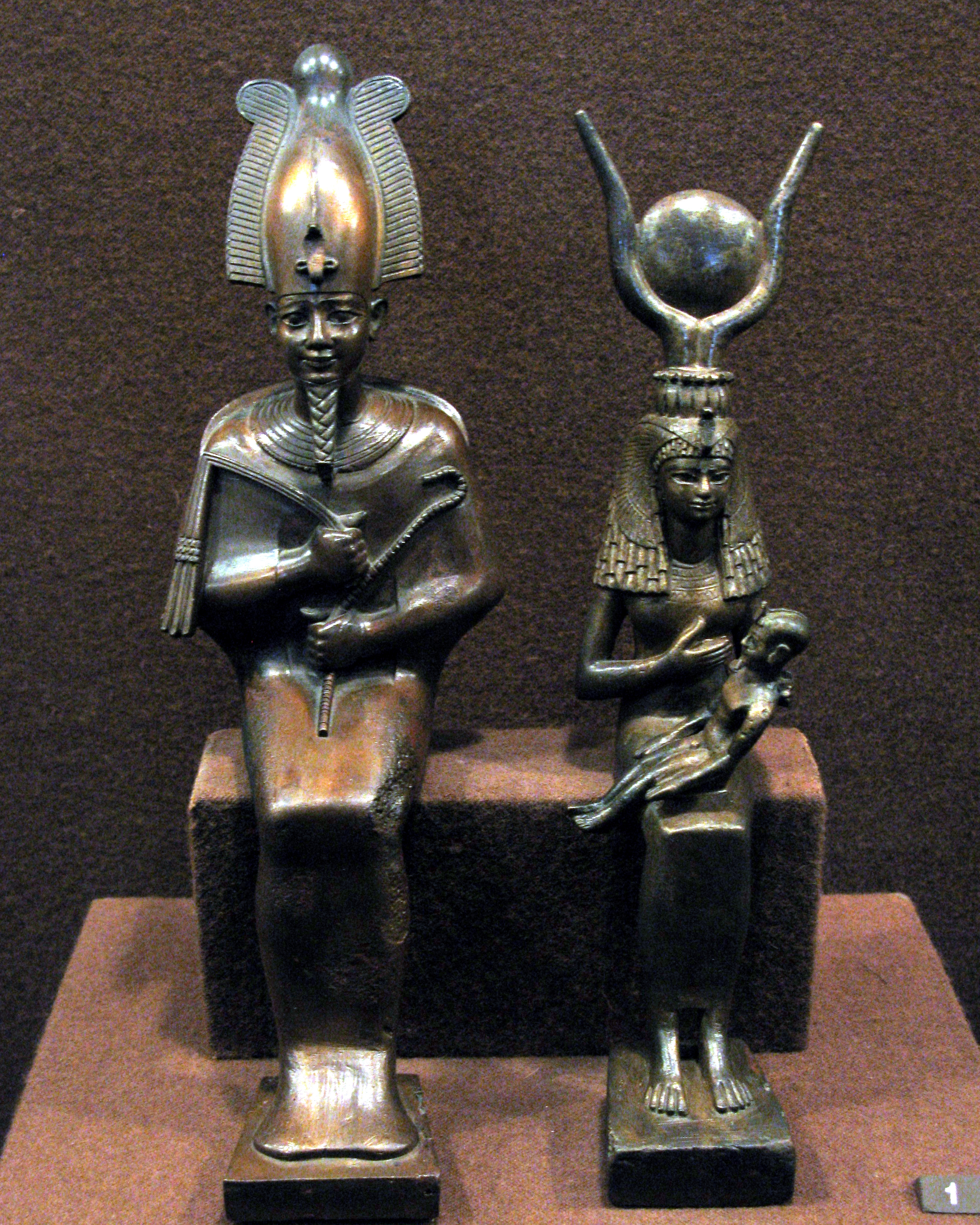
Osiris and Isis, statuettes at the Hermitage Museum, St. Petersburg, Russia

In the abundance of divinities in Egyptian mythology, there existed a large number of goddesses, as was also the case in Greece. By studying their symbolism one can learn the image that women had in the eyes of the ancient Egyptians. As with Greek divinities, many were related to one another, by blood or marriage, such as Isis and her sister Nephthys, both the respective wives of Osiris (the god of the dead) and of Set, themselves brothers.

Women and their image were most often associated with life and fertility. In the case of the goddess Isis, who was associated with many principles: as the wife of Osiris who was killed by his brother, she was connected to funeral rites. As a mother, she became the feminine protector, but above all the mother-creator, she who gives life. Through this goddess, the principles of life and death were closely linked. In effect, while she was associated with funeral rites, these rites were to prevent the deceased from submitting to a second death in the succeeding dimension, which explains among other things, the food found in abundance by archeologists in the tombs. On the other hand, life in its physical aspect meaningful only by death, because these principles are part of a movement of eternal new beginning that is then in a sense more spiritual, the movement of life, or eternal life. A symbol of the goddess is also the palm tree, the symbol of eternal life. She breathed the breath of eternal life to her dead husband.

The goddess represented the era's regard for women, because it was crucial to maintain the spirit in her image, it was this idea of eternal life and of maturity that Isis reflected, venerated as the Celestial Mother. It was in this role that Isis was arguably made the most important deity of Egyptian mythology. Her influence even extended to religions of different civilizations, where she would become identified under different names and where her cult grew, particularly in the Roman Empire.

The most influential goddesses were Isis, goddess of magic and mysticism, Hathor, goddess of nourishment and love, Bastet, goddess-protector of the home, and Sekhmet, goddess of wrath.

=== Priesthood ===
Women could become priests in Ancient Egypt. However, as was common in Ancient societies, there was no general rule for women's rights to become priests. Instead, the priesthood was different for each separate divinity depending on the local cult of each divinity. This meant that women could be accepted as priests for a specific divinity in one temple and not accepted in another, as was the case with men.

==== Priestess of Hathor ====
One of the most famed priesthoods for women in Ancient Egypt was the Priestess of Hathor or Prophetess of Hathor, which was the title of the Priestess of the goddess Hathor in the Temple of Dendera in Ancient Egypt.

==== God's Wives ====
"God's Wife of Amun" was the highest-ranking priestess of the Amun cult. At the beginning of the New Kingdom, the title was associated with royalty, usually kings' wives or kings' mothers. The first royal wife to hold this title was Ahmose-Nefertari, wife of Ahmose I, who then passed it on to her daughter, Meritamen who then passed it on to Hatshepsut. Both Ahmose-Nefertari and Hatshepsut used this title as an alternative to King's Principal Wife which reflects the significance that lay behind the title. The title God's Wife was another title given to royal women in sacral roles. In the Nubian and Saite Periods, they built their own chapels and mortuary temples. In addition to God's Wife, these women had other titles such as Divine Adorer or God's Hand. Unlike revered women in other cultures, the concept of chastity wasn't relevant to the ancient Egyptians' religious practice.

== Social and political position of women ==
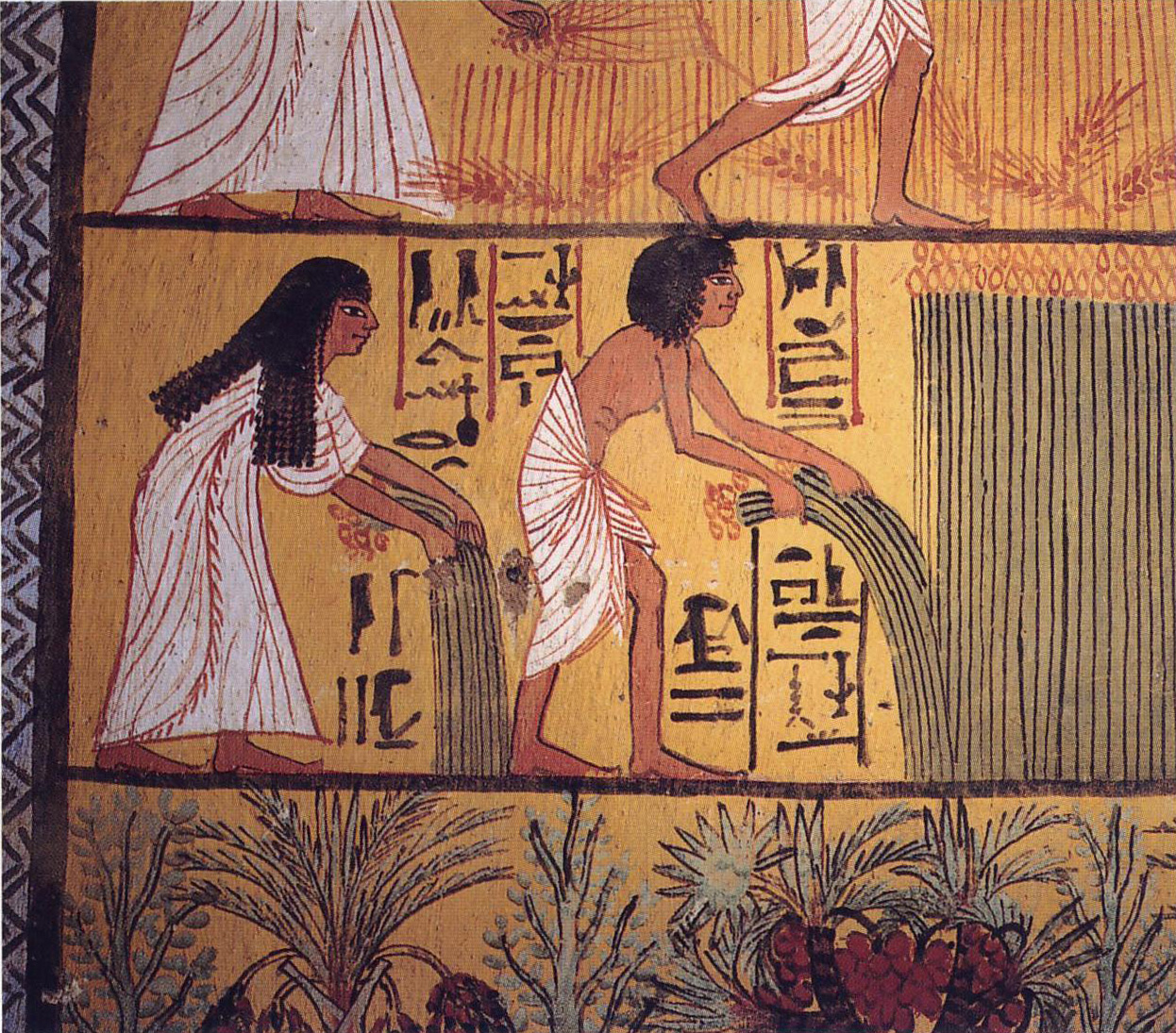
Couple harvesting crops

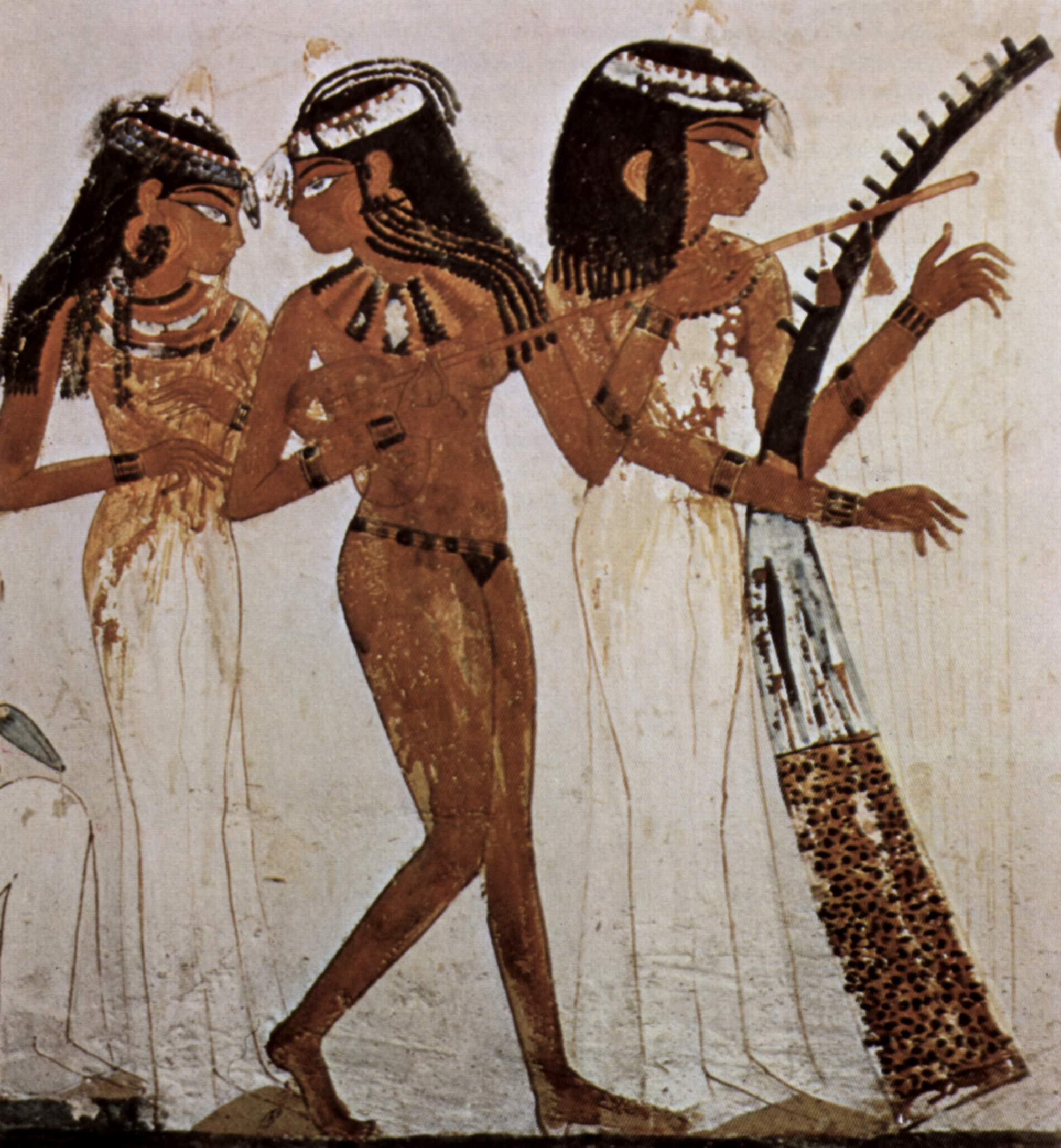
Female musicians

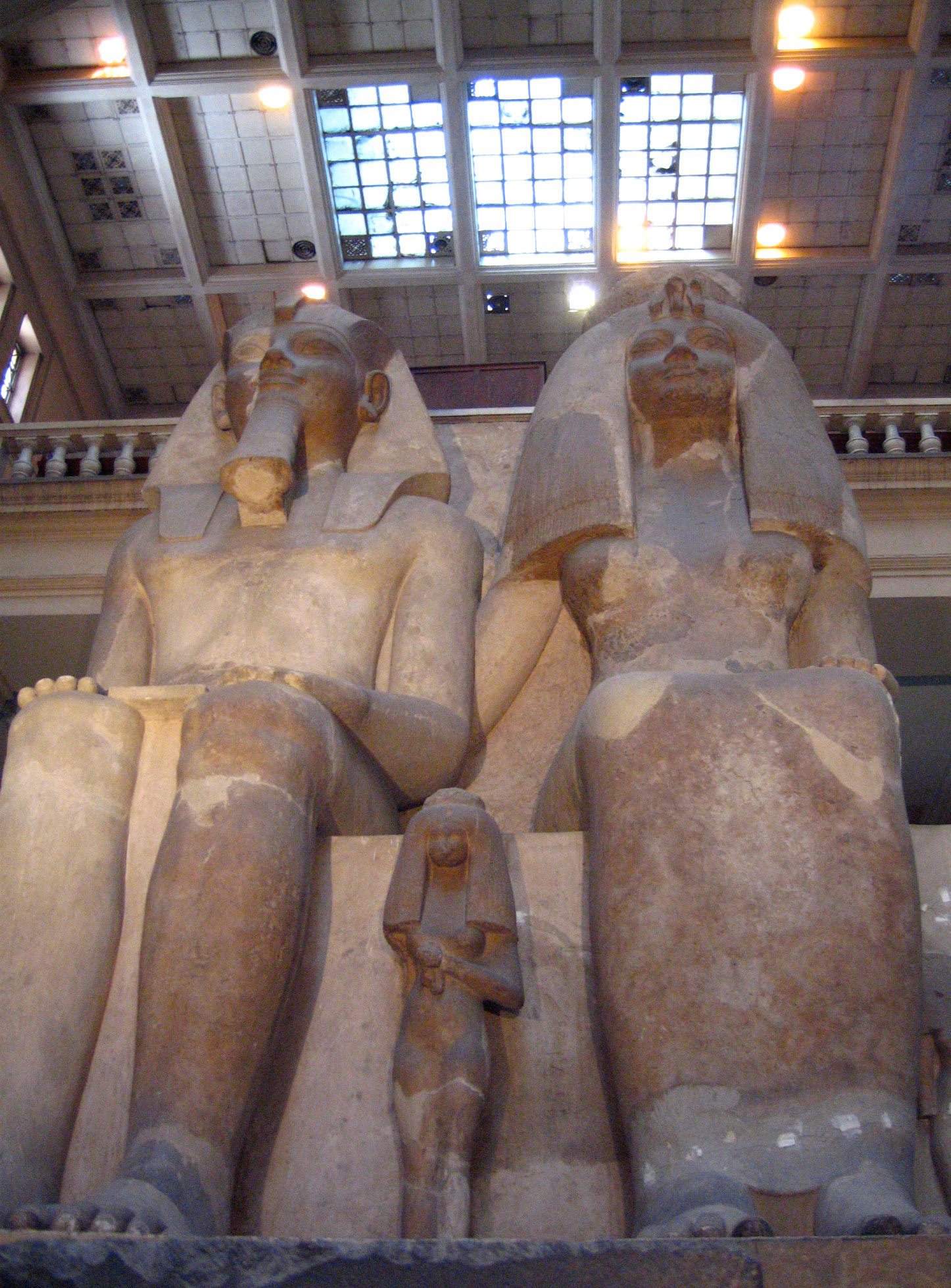
Amenhotep III and Queen Tiye

In many of ancient Egypt's artistic approaches, we see women supporting or clasping their husband, maybe even protecting them. So in some sense, the woman could be the protector, probably associated with the concept of protective goddesses. Women mingled in society, we see evidence of that where peasant women were depicted helping with the harvest; townswomen are shown as professional musicians, dancers, members of temple staff and party guests.

So women weren't just traditional stay at home wives, but they contributed to society and sometimes even in untraditional ways. There are scenes of women in weaving workshops, and tomb inscriptions of women's professional involvement. Such titles could range from political to religious to funerary. Some titles inscribed on tombs were mainly honorific; to honor the women after they die. Some examples of titles are: Overseer of Female Physicians, Judge and Vizier, Director of the Dining Hall, and Overseer of Funerary Priests.

Religious positions weren't limited to noblewomen. In fact, there is evidence of priestesses of major goddesses bearing humble titles like tenant farmer. As history moves from the Old Kingdom to the Middle Kingdom, there is less evidence of women in authority, which may suggest changes in political and social norms. In the New Kingdom, however, texts show that women had their own legal identity and could even purchase and inherit land without the need for male consent.

During this period, women were portrayed in all shapes and sizes, where their status and wealth were reflected in the size of their statue. Idealistic portrayals were an important part of Egyptian art, mainly because they believed that these representations would follow them into eternity. Egyptian mothers were a significant part of ancient Egypt. Egyptian men, even those of the highest social class, often placed only their mother's names on their monuments. Egyptian mothers were more prominently displayed than the fathers, also in literature. The ancient Egyptians paid attention to size and quantity; large tombs indicated a significance of the deceased.

Some queens of the early dynasties even commemorated tombs as large as their husbands'. The pair statue of Amenhotep III and his common-born wife, Queen Tiye, dominates a room at the Cairo Museum, showing the queen as of equal size as the king. Hatshepsut, unsatisfied with her status as second best to her father, took it to clarifying her divine conception, so as to legitimize her ruling as pharaoh by recording the miracle of her birth on the walls of the second terrace.

== Influence of the image ==
=== Rediscovery of ancient Egypt during the era of Napoleon ===
In 1798, Napoleon Bonaparte led a campaign in Egypt that would be a military fiasco, but which enabled him to return to France with drawings and observations by artists and scientists that he had brought on the expedition.

But it was in 1822 that Egypt became more open to researchers, the wider world developed a passion for ancient Egypt, and wanted to know more about its history and its culture.

The fascination with Egypt that followed, and with everything that concerned Antiquity, carried a powerful influence. In this era, in Paris, almost all fields of creativity were heavily inspired by the rediscoveries from Antiquity. The arts became redirected along this path, following the fashion for ancient Egypt down every esthetic route. In this way, clothing styles changed, and women during the Napoleonic Empire adopted styles associated with ancient Egyptian women, combined with the influence of Ancient Greece and Rome: corsets were abandoned (only temporarily), as well as petticoats, and the raised Empire waist was the popular dress silhouette. Dresses were lighter, and were decorated with motifs from Antiquity, for example palm trees, one of the symbols of the goddess Isis.

=== Modern images of women in ancient Egypt ===
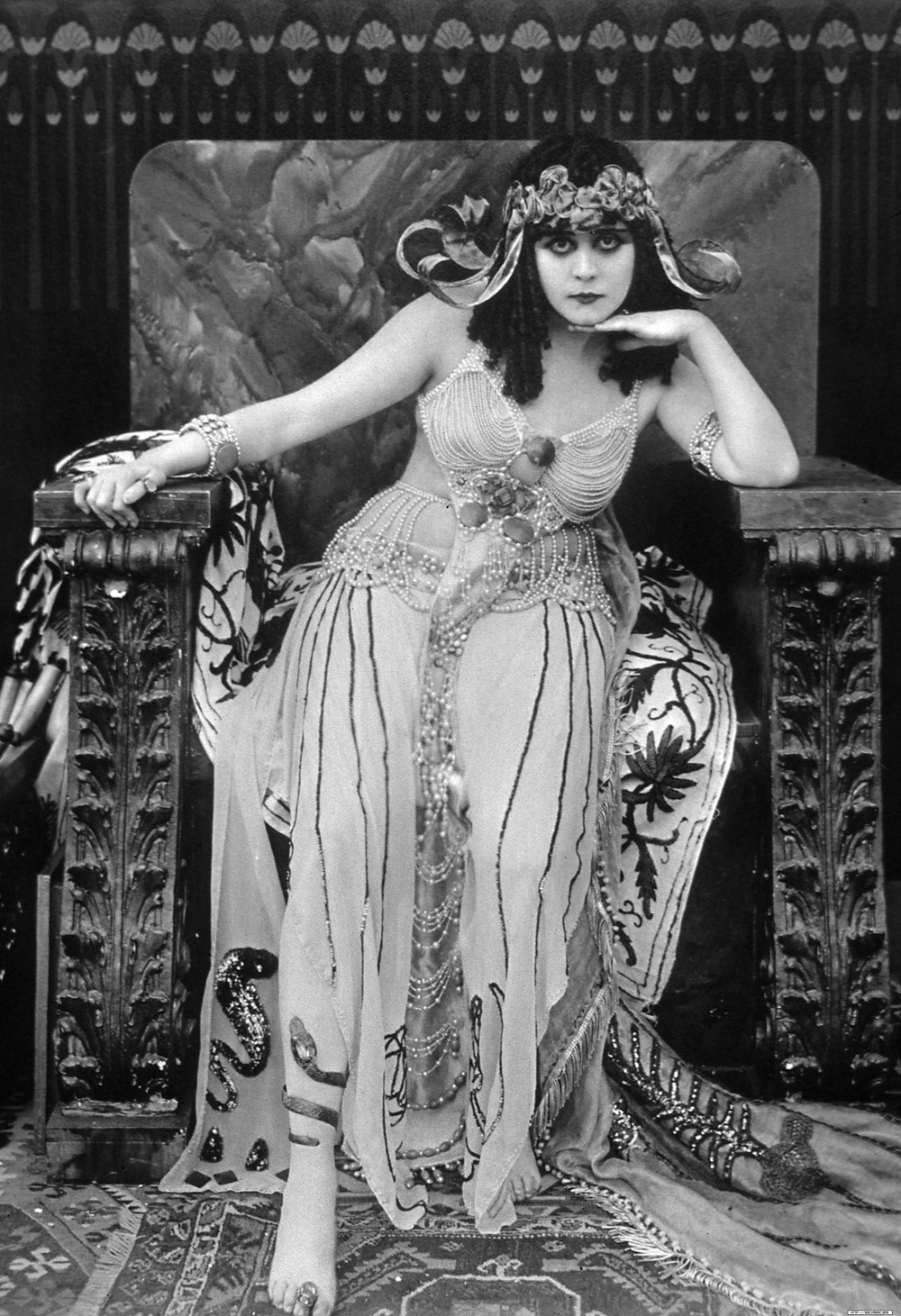
Theda Bara poses in a still image from Cleopatra. Exotic sets and costumes, depicting a fantasy version of ancient Egypt, were a good fit for Theda Bara's popular "vamp" image.

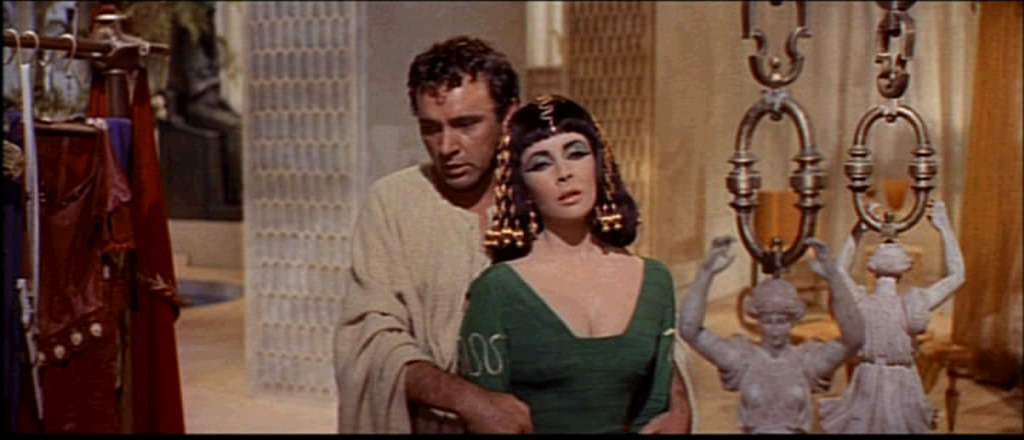
Elizabeth Taylor and Richard Burton starred in Cleopatra.

When women in ancient Egypt are evoked, the first image that comes to mind for most is that of Cleopatra, or more precisely, Cleopatra VII. Although having a Greek origin, it is she who would be associated with the image of women in ancient Egypt, for several generations. This has been in large part due to modern cinema, especially the films of the Golden Age of Hollywood.

During the 1950s and 1960s, a number of costume dramas were produced, putting on screen Egyptian women imagined during this era where filmmakers want to show glamour. In 1963, the glamorous image of Cleopatra was cemented for the public in the film Cleopatra directed by Joseph L. Mankiewicz, and portrayed by Liz Taylor. This intrigue for the queen is explained by the tumultuous life that she lived, full of intrigues, romances (her two most famous lovers being Julius Caesar and Marc Antony). Through her connection to ancient Egypt, she has an aura of mystery for spectators, the same aura that surrounds ancient Egypt and its esoteric aspects, the same mysteriousness linked in the popular imagination with ancient curses of mummies, or other secrets of the tombs. Presented this way, Egyptian women become a sort of seductress, fascinating because of a romanticized view of her. As a sign of celebrity, this imagined Egypt has not only been the object of fantasies but has also been caricatured. The best-known of these caricatures today are those appearing in such media of popular culture as the Astérix comic books of René Goscinny and Albert Uderzo. Playing on the glamorous image created by cinema, the authors satirize the fascination that Cleopatra exercises on those around her, focusing especially on her nose and exaggerating her queenly status by depicting her as capricious and temperamental, far-removed from the ideal of the seductive woman so often imagined.

In a more general manner, this image of Egyptian women, forceful, behind a mysterious and magical veil, and exercising a seductive power, continues to this day, for example in the American series Stargate SG-1.

Fashion designers are also regularly inspired by the iconography of Egyptian women, who have become an esthetic point of reference.

== Royal women (in chronological order) ==
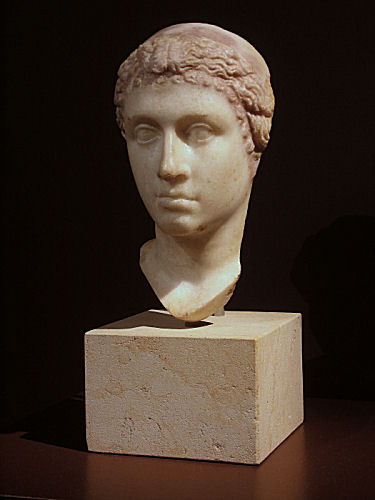
Roman bust of Cleopatra VII, the penultimate ruler of Ptolemaic dynasty. Altes Museum, Berlin.

- First dynasty of Egypt
  - Merneith, daughter of Djer, wife of Djet, mother of Den
- Third dynasty of Egypt
  - Djefatnebti, wife of Huni
- Fourth dynasty of Egypt
  - Meresankh I, second wife of Huni, mother of Sneferu
  - Hetepheres I, wife of Sneferu, mother of Khufu
  - Meritites I, wife of Khufu, mother of Kawab, Baufra, Djedefhor and Meresankh II
  - Henutsen, second wife of Khufu, mother of Khufukhaf I and Khafre
  - Nubet, fourth wife of Khufu, mother of Khentetenka, Djedefra and Hetepheres II
  - Khamerernebti I, wife of Khafre, mother of Menkaure
  - Khamerernebti II, second wife Khafre then wife of Menkaure
  - Khentkaus I, wife of Shepseskaf then of Userkaf, mother of Neferirkare Kakai and Sahure
- Fifth Dynasty of Egypt
  - Nimaathap II, unknown husband
- Eleventh dynasty of Egypt
  - Neferu, wife of Intef II, mother of Intef III
  - Iah, wife of Intef III, mother of Mentuhotep II
  - Tem, first wife of Mentuhotep II, mother of Mentuhotep III
  - Neferu, second wife and sister of Mentuhotep II
  - Ashayet, concubine of Mentuhotep II, also a priestess of the goddess Hathor
  - Imi, wife of Mentuhotep III, mother of Mentuhotep IV
- Twelfth dynasty of Egypt
  - Neferet or Nofret, wife of a priest in Thebes, Senousret, mother of Amenemhat I
  - Neferitatjenen, principal wife of Amenemhat I, mother of Senusret I
  - Dedyet, other wife of Amenemhat I, possibly also his sister
  - Neferu III, wife of Senusret I, mother of Amenemhat II
  - Itakaiet, daughter or wife Senusret I
  - Neferusobek, Neferuptah, Nenseddjedet, daughters of Senusret I
  - Khenemetneferhedjet I, daughter of Amenemhat II
  - Neferet II, wife of Senusret II
  - Khenemetneferhedjet I, wife of Senusret II, mother of Senusret III
  - Sithathoriunet, daughter of Senusret II
  - Mereret and Sithathor, daughters of Senusret III
  - Sobekneferu, female Pharaoh, daughter of Amenemhat III, wife of her own brother Amenemhat IV
- Thirteenth dynasty of Egypt
  - Nubhetepti, wife of Hor
  - Senebhenas and Neni, wives of Sobekhotep III
  - Senebsen, wife of Neferhotep I
  - Tjan, wife of Sobekhotep IV
  - Aya, wife of Intef
  - Sitmut, wife of Mentuhotep V
- Fourteenth dynasty of Egypt
  - Tati, wife of Sheshi
- Sixteenth dynasty of Egypt
  - Mentuhotep, wife of Djehuti
- Seventeenth dynasty of Egypt
  - Nubemhat, wife of Sobekemsaf I
  - Sobekemsaf, wife of Antef VII
  - Noubemhet, wife of Sobekemsaf II
  - Tetisheri, daughter of Tienna and Neferu, wife of Senakhtenre Tao I
  - Ahhotep I, daughter of Senakhtenre Tao I, sister and wife of Seqenenre Tao II
  - Ahmose-Nefertari, daughter of Seqenenre Tao II and of Ahhotep I, sister and wife of Ahmose I, mother of Amenhotep I and Ahmose-Sipair
- Eighteenth dynasty of Egypt
  - Ahmose-Meritamon, daughter of Ahmose I and Ahmose-Nefertari, wife of her brother Amenhotep I
  - Ahmes, possible sister of Amenhotep I, wife of Thutmose I, mother of Hatshepsut and Amenemes
  - Mutnofret, second wife of Thutmose I, mother of Thutmose II
  - Hatshepsut, female Pharaoh, daughter of Thutmose I and of Ahmes, wife of her half-brother Thutmose II, mother of Neferure
  - Iset, second wife of Thutmose II, mother of Thutmose III
  - Mutemwiya, wife of Thutmose IV, mother of Amenhotep III
  - Tiye, wife of Amenhotep III
  - Nefertiti, wife of Akhenaten
  - Kiya, secondary wife of Akhenaten
  - Meritaten, daughter of Akhenaten and Nefertiti, wife of Smenkhkare
  - Neferneferuaten, female Pharaoh
  - Ankhesenamun, daughter of Akhenaten and Nefertiti, wife of Tutankhamun
  - Tey, wife of Ay II, wet-nurse of Nefertiti
  - Mutnedjmet, wife of Horemheb, possibly sister of Nefertiti
- Nineteenth dynasty of Egypt
  - Sitre, wife of Ramesses I, mother of Seti I
  - Tuya, wife of Seti I
  - Nefertari, wife of Ramesses II
  - Isetnofret, second wife of Ramesses II, mother of Merneptah
  - Tausret, female Pharaoh wife of Seti II
- Ptolemaic dynasty of Egypt
  - Berenice I, wife of Ptolemy I, mother of Arsinoe II and of Ptolemy II
  - Arsinoe I, wife of Ptolemy II, mother of Ptolemy III
  - Berenice II, daughter of Magas, King of Cyrene and of Arsinoe, wife of Demetrios the Just, brother of the King of Macedonia then of Ptolemy III, mother of Arsinoe III and of Ptolemy IV
  - Cleopatra I, wife of Ptolemy V
  - Cleopatra II, female Pharaoh, wife of Ptolemy VI then of Ptolemy VIII
  - Cleopatra III, female Pharaoh, daughter of Ptolemy VI and Cleopatra II, second wife of Ptolemy VIII
  - Cleopatra IV, wife of Ptolemy IX
  - Cleopatra Selene I, second wife of Ptolemy IX
  - Berenice III, female Pharaoh, daughter of Ptolemy IX, wife of Ptolemy X and Ptolemy XI
  - Cleopatra V Tryphaena, female Pharaoh, wife of Ptolemy XII, mother of Berenice IV and possibly her younger siblings
  - Cleopatra VI Tryphaena, female Pharaoh, presumed to be daughter of Ptolemy XII or the same person as Cleopatra V
  - Berenice IV, female Pharaoh, daughter of Ptolemy XII and Cleopatra V
  - Cleopatra VII, female Pharaoh, daughter of Ptolemy XII, wife of Ptolemy XIII then of Ptolemy XIV and of Marc Antony, mother of Ptolemy XV, Cleopatra Selene II, Alexander Helios and Ptolemy
  - Cleopatra Selene II, Queen regnant of Mauretania, daughter of Cleopatra VII and Marc Antony, wife of Juba II, King of Mauretania, mother of Ptolemy of Mauretania and probable grandmother of Drusilla

== See also ==
- Beauty and cosmetics in ancient Egypt
- Women in Egypt
- List of archaeologically attested women from the ancient Mediterranean region

== Bibliography ==
- Joyce Tyldesley, Daughters of Isis: Women of Ancient Egypt, Penguin (1995) ISBN 978-0-14-017596-7
- Joyce Tyldesley, Cleopatra: Last Queen of Egypt, Profile Books (2009) ISBN 978-1-86197-901-8.
- Gay Robins, Women in Ancient Egypt, Harvard University Press (1993) ISBN 978-0-674-95469-4
- Carolyn Graves-Brown, Dancing for Hathor: Women in Ancient Egypt, Continuum (2010) ISBN 978-1-84725-054-4
- Tara Sewell-Lasater, Becoming Kleopatra: Ptolemaic Royal Marriage, Incest, and the Path to the Female Rule, University of Houston (2020)
- Kara Cooney, When Women Ruled the World: Six Queens of Egypt, National Geographic (2018) ISBN 978-1-4262-1977-1.

=== Sources ===
- Christiane Desroches Noblecourt, La femme au temps des pharaons, Stock, 1986
- Pierre Montet, La vie quotidienne en Égypte au temps des Ramsès, Hachette, 1946
