= Tomb of Hetpet =

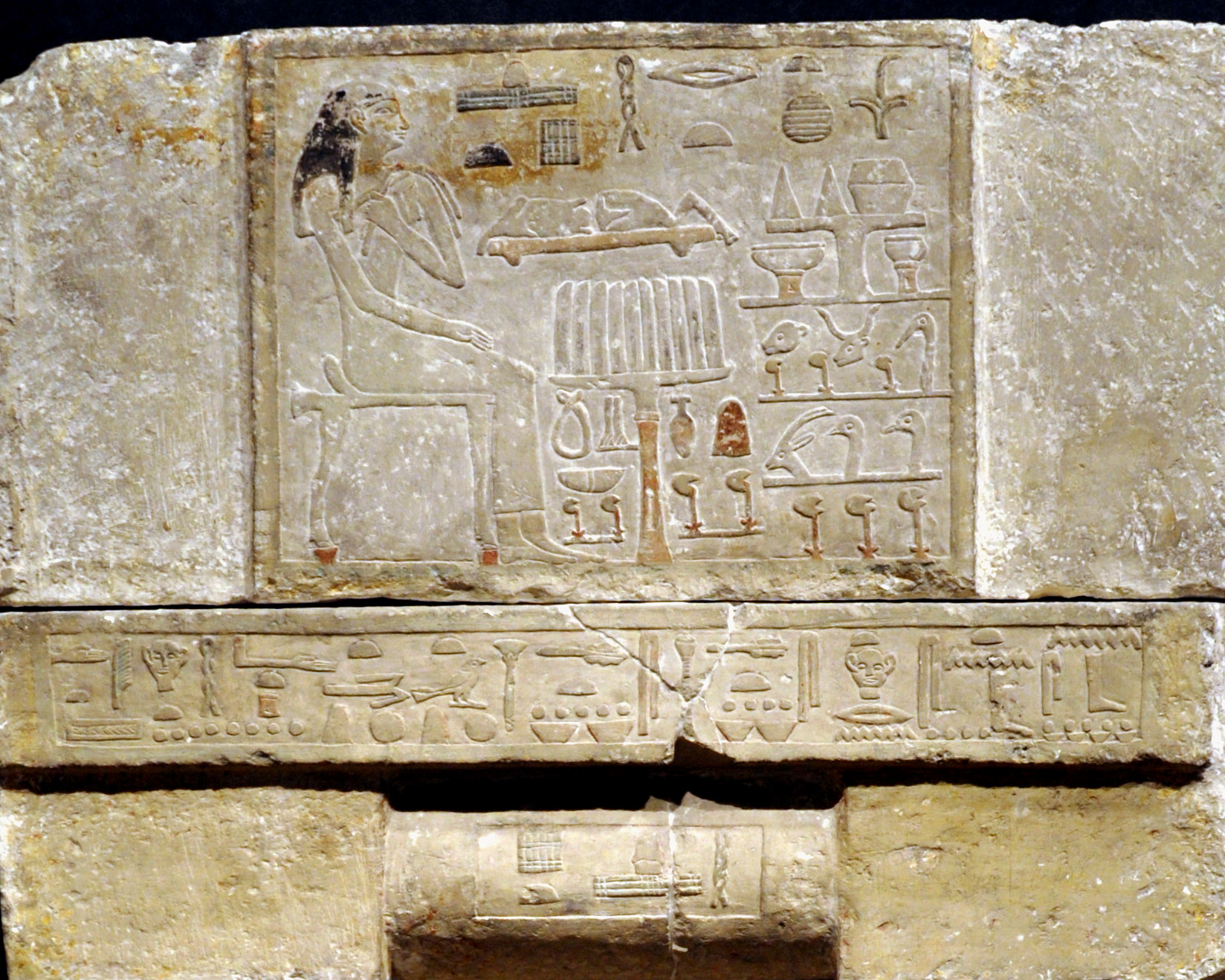
- Falsedoor of Hetepet (Liebieghaus) (detail); Burial site of Hetpet
- Interactive map of Tomb of Hetpet
- Type: Tomb
- Location: Egypt

Site notes
- Material: Stone
- Discovered: 1909 by Carl Kaufmann

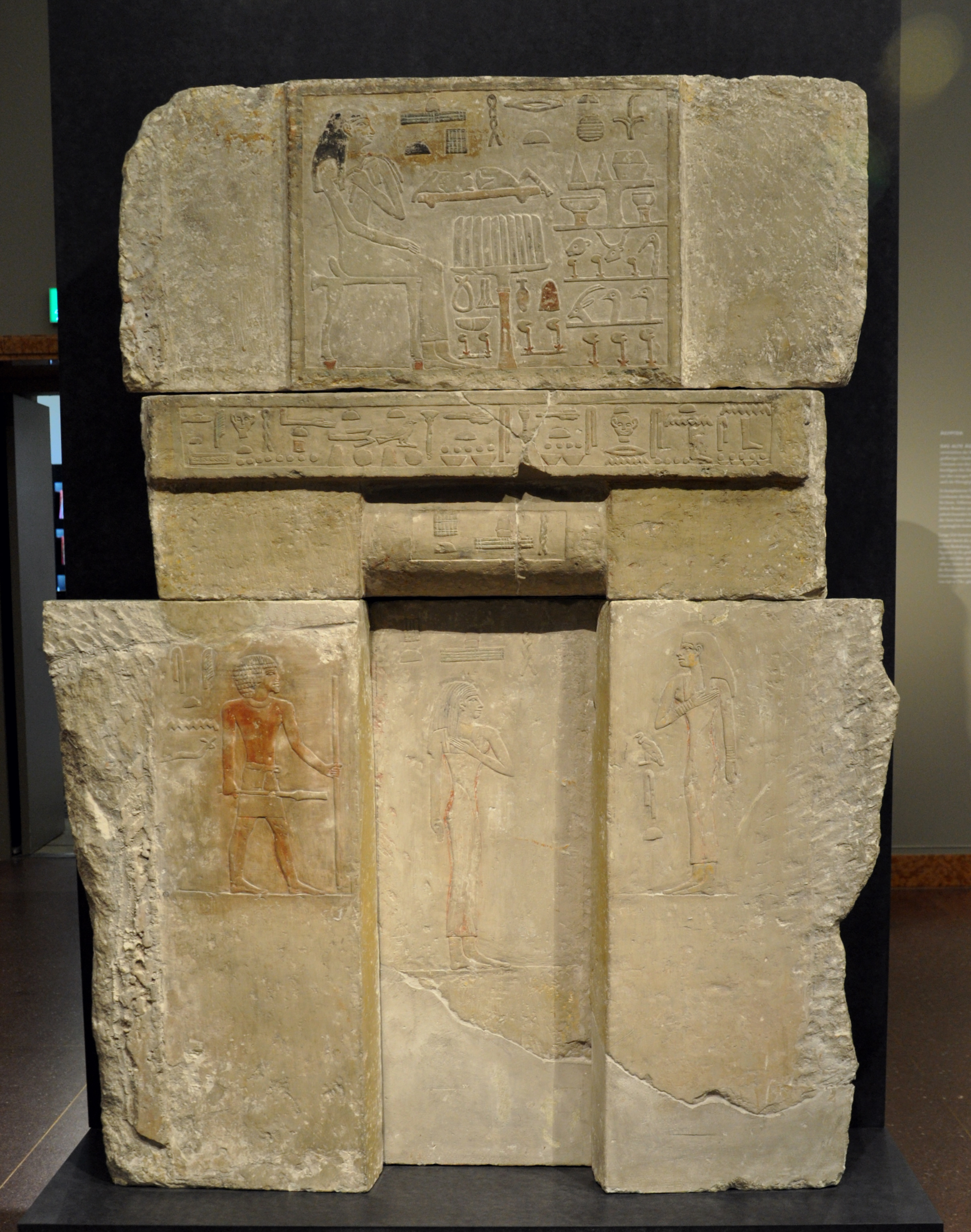
Falsedoor of Hetepet (Liebieghaus)

The Tomb of Hetpet (Hetepet) is a 4,400 year old Egyptian tomb of a priestess. It was discovered in 1909 by Carl Kaufmann at Giza, a location close to the pyramids of Cairo. Many decorated stone blocks were taken out and brought to the Egyptian Museum of Berlin and to the Liebieghaus in Frankfurt.

The tomb was rediscovered in 2017 by an Egyptian expedition. The remaining parts of the tomb chapel have well preserved paintings. The existence of Hetpet was already established from indications of her name upon objects discovered sometime during 1909. She was a priestess of Hathor, alive during the 5th Dynasty, Tenant Landholder and king's acquaintance.

There is not much known about her family. Her father's name is only partly preserved and started with Nef. The tomb chapel has so far not shown any indication of anyone she might have married.
