= Neferu =

Given name

nfr nfr nfr B1
Neferu
in hieroglyphs

Neferu ("beauty") was an ancient Egyptian name. Bearers of the name include:

- Neferu I, a queen of Montuhotep I (11th dynasty)
- Neferu or Neferukayet, probably the mother of Intef III (11th dynasty)
- Neferu II, a queen of Montuhotep II (11th dynasty)
- Neferu III, a queen of Senusret I (12th dynasty)
- Neferu (13th dynasty) sister to Pharaoh Imyremeshaw or Sehetepkare Intef; mentioned on Papyrus Bulaq 18 with sister-in-law Aya.
- Neferu (13th dynasty), princess, daughter of an unidentified king. Married to Sobekhotep, Chief of Police of the Temple of Anubis, and mentioned on a stela from Abydos.
- Neferu (17th dynasty), mother of Queen Tetisheri
