= Neferu I =

Egyptian queen consort

nfr nfr nfr

Queen consort of Egypt
- Tenure: c. 2135 BC
- King: Possibly Mentuhotep I
- Spouse: Possibly Mentuhotep I
- Issue: Intef I Intef II
- Dynasty: 11th dynasty

Neferu I ("the beauty"; fl. c. 2135 BC) was the first queen consort of the 11th Dynasty of Egypt. She may have been a wife of the King Mentuhotep I.

Her sons were Intef I and Intef II and she was a grandmother of Intef III and Queen Iah, his wife. She was also a great-grandmother of Neferu II.

She is mentioned on one stela.

It is possible that she is the same as the Queen Neferukayet, who is thought to be the wife of Intef II. Her titles would be then: "King's wife, his beloved", "King's daughter" and "Royal Ornament".
