= Tjetjy =

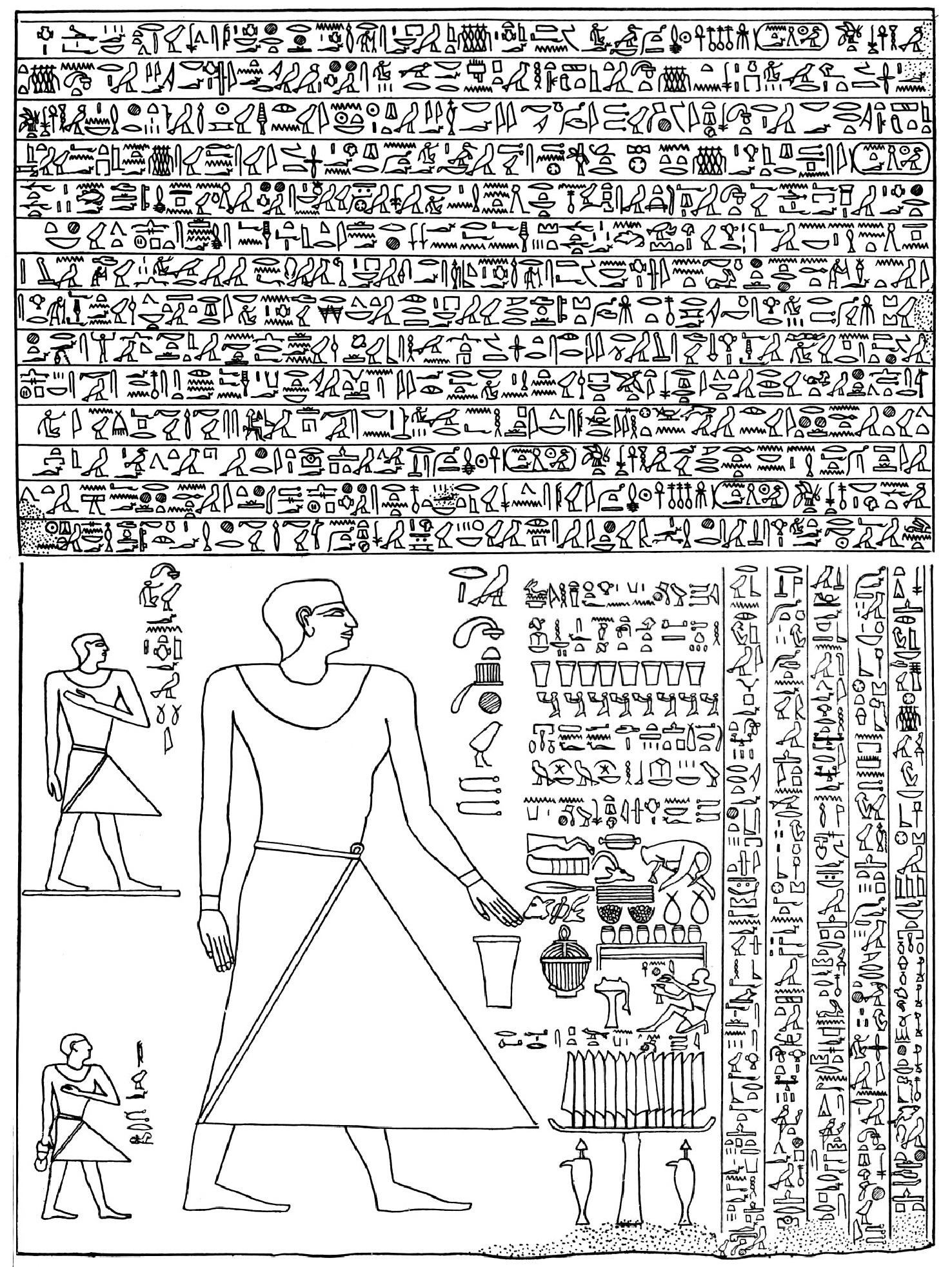
Stela with biography of Tjetjy (British Museum 614)

Tjetjy was an Ancient Egyptian treasurer in the Eleventh Dynasty under the kings Intef II and Intef III. He is known from two stelae now in the British Museum, that most likely originally come from his tomb at Thebes. The texts one of these stelae bears a long biographical inscription providing much evidence for the reigns of these kings and the person of Tjetjy. Tjetjy states that he served king Intef II who ruled Egypt from Elephantine in the South to Thinis in the North. King Intef II lived in the First Intermediate Period when Egypt was divided into two countries. The stela of Tjetjy provides evidence about the extent of the king's rule. The biography also mentioned that Intef II and was followed by Intef III. The text often stresses how loyal Tjetjy was to his kings and also provides evidence for the office of the treasurer.

== Weblink ==
°Limestone stela of Tjetjim webside of the British Museum
