= Pleated linen =

Pleated linen is a form of processing linen which results in a fabric which is heavily pleated and does not crease like normal linen fabric.

== History ==
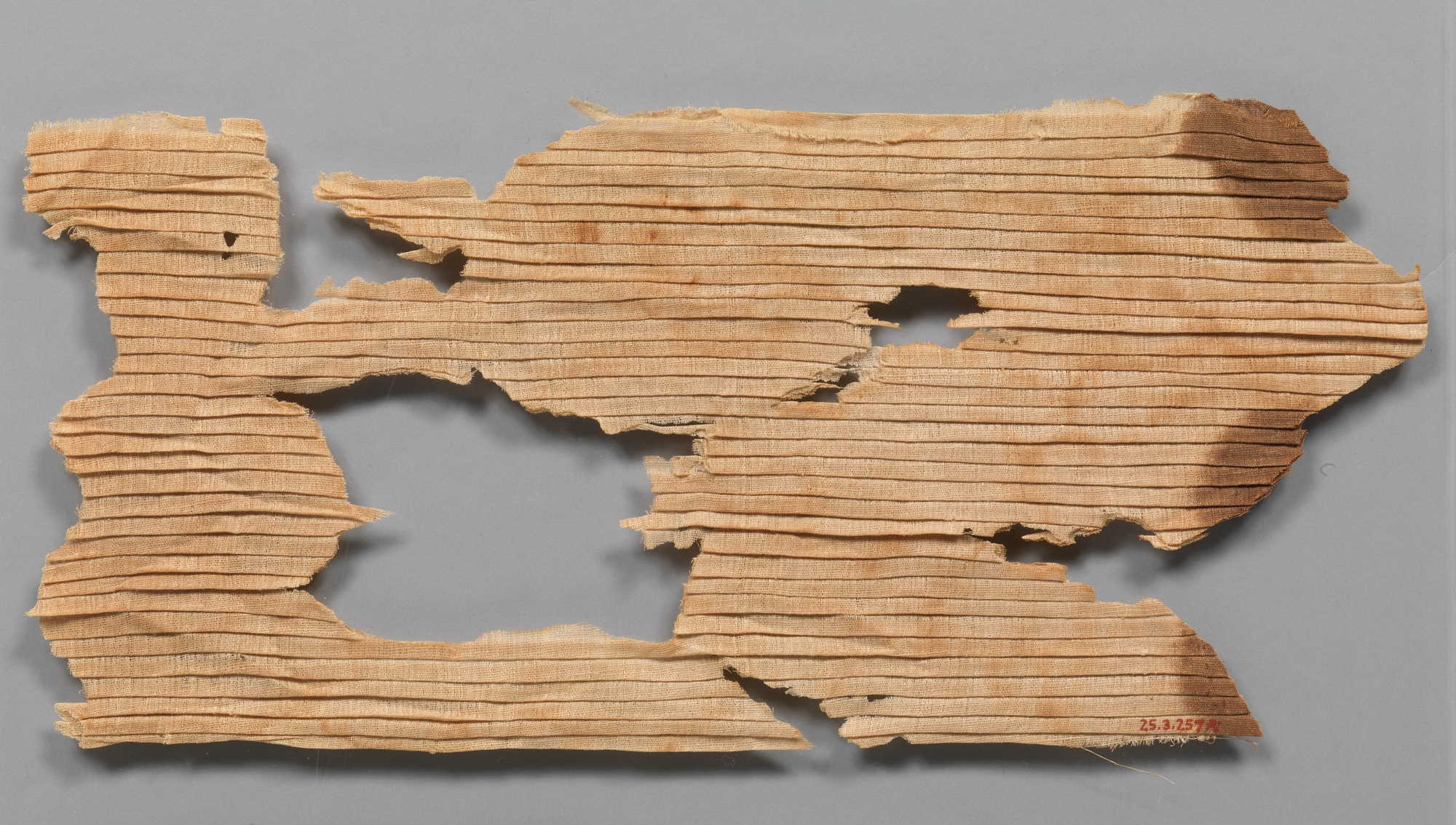
Pleated linen of queen Neferu ca. 2051–2030 B.C.

The earliest form of pleated linen dates from ancient Egypt and can be seen in a garment known as the Tarkhan dress, which is over 5000 years old and is believed to be one of the oldest dresses in existence. Other examples of pleated linen from ancient history include pleated linen from the tomb of queen Neferu. The Museum of Fine Arts, Boston has in its collection four excellently preserved pleated linen dresses, all found in 1902-1903 by George A. Reisner at the cemetery of Naga ed-Deir in Egypt. It is not known exactly how the Egyptians pleated linen, but the material may have been "folded, accordion style, then tied, and wetted."

== Modern use ==
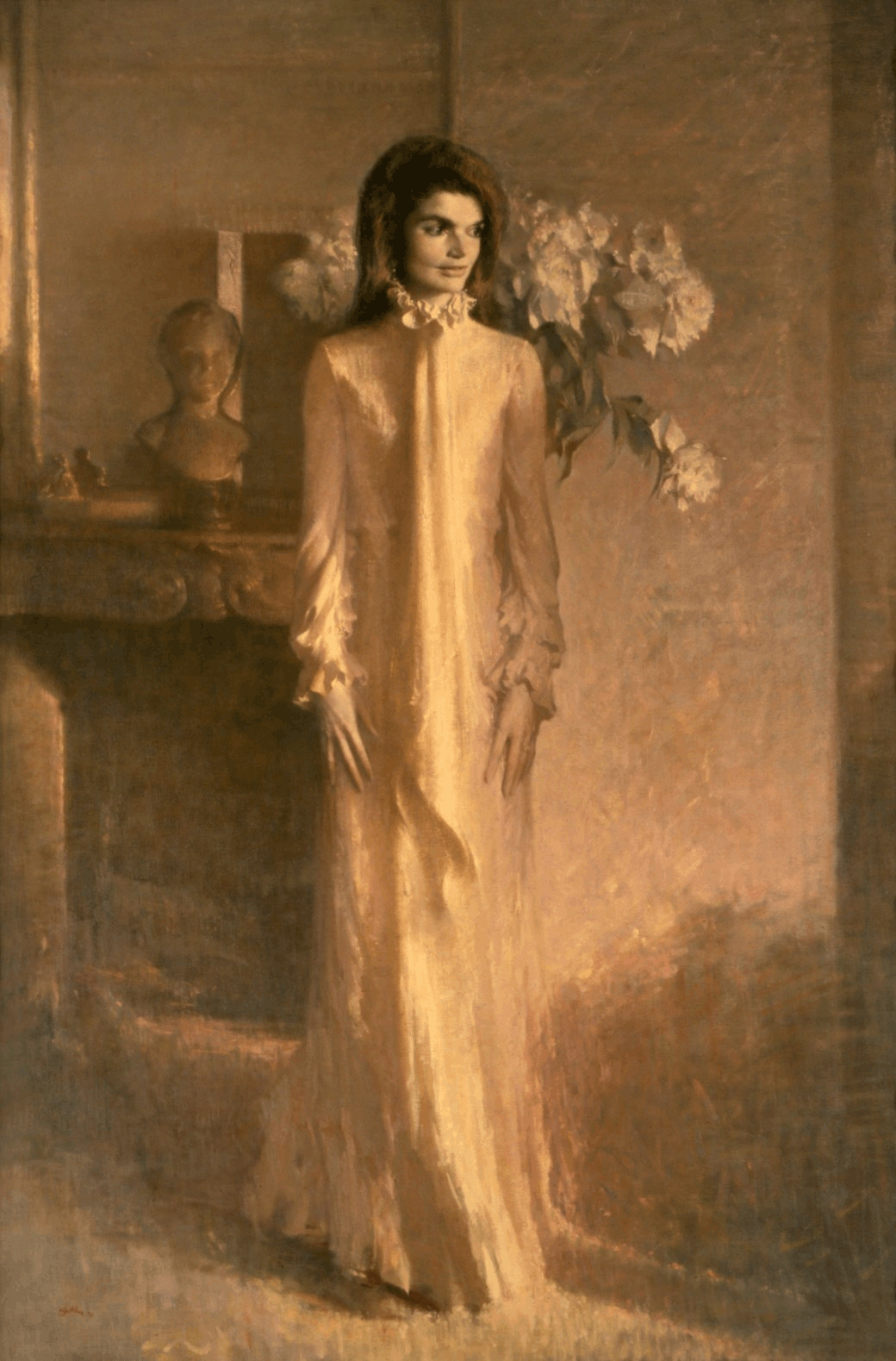
Jacqueline Kennedy's official White House portrait featuring a pleated linen Sybil Connolly design

In the 1950s the Irish fashion designer, Sybil Connolly, developed a method of hand-pleating linen with the handkerchief linen manufacturer Spence Bryson. Handkerchief linen is a light form of linen, and this pleating process used 9 yards of the material to create 1 yard of pleated linen. The pleating of the fabric meant that unlike other linen garments, ones made with pleated linen were uncrushable, could be packed without becoming creased and maintained their shape. First Lady Jacqueline Kennedy selected a pleated linen creation by Sybil Connolly when she sat for an official Aaron Shikler White House portrait in 1970. Sybil was reportedly very protective of her pleating method, saying it was a secret she would “carry to the grave.”

== Gallery ==
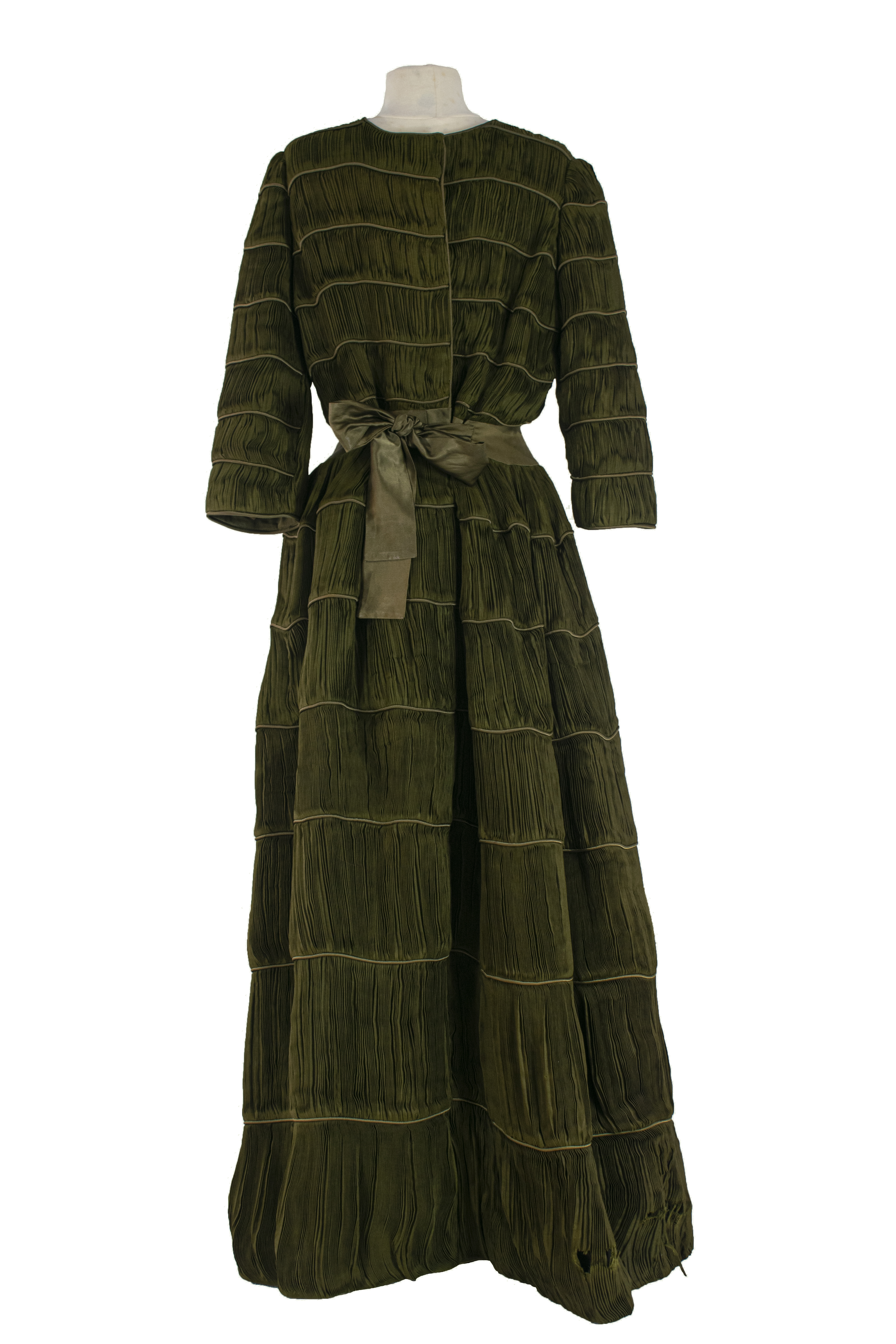
A moss-green pleated linen evening dress with three-quarter length sleeves and a round high neckline. Designed by Sybil Connolly.

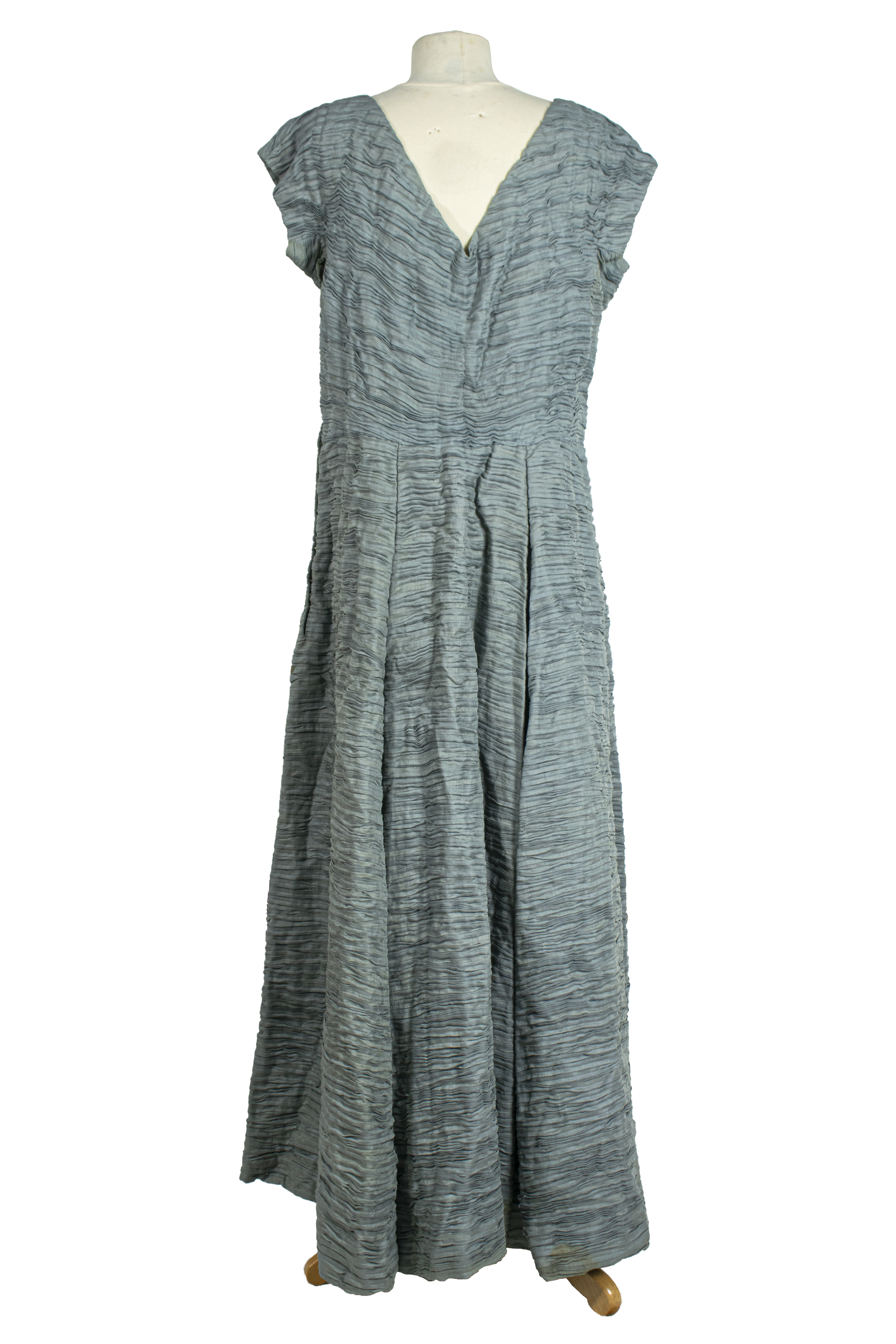
Grey pleated dress designed by Sybil Connolly.

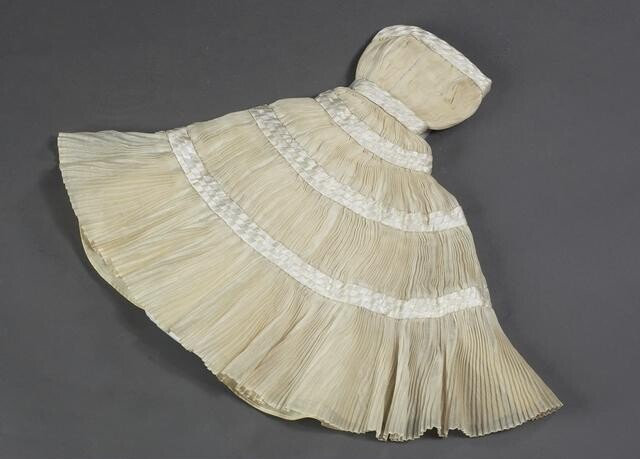
Maquette for a pleated linen cream evening gown named 'First Love' by Sybil Connolly

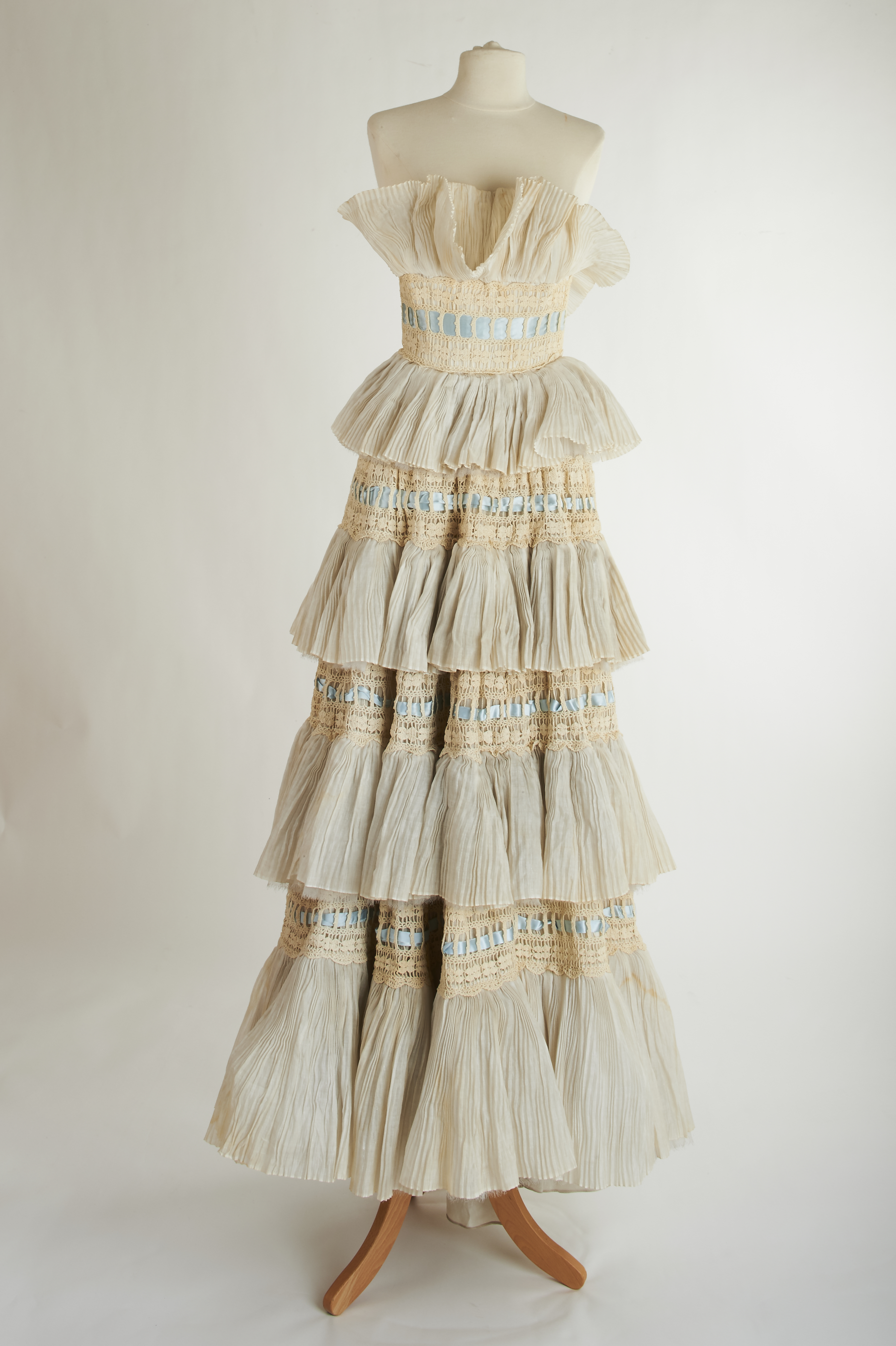
Pleated linen 'Heiress' dress 1957 by Sybil Connolly

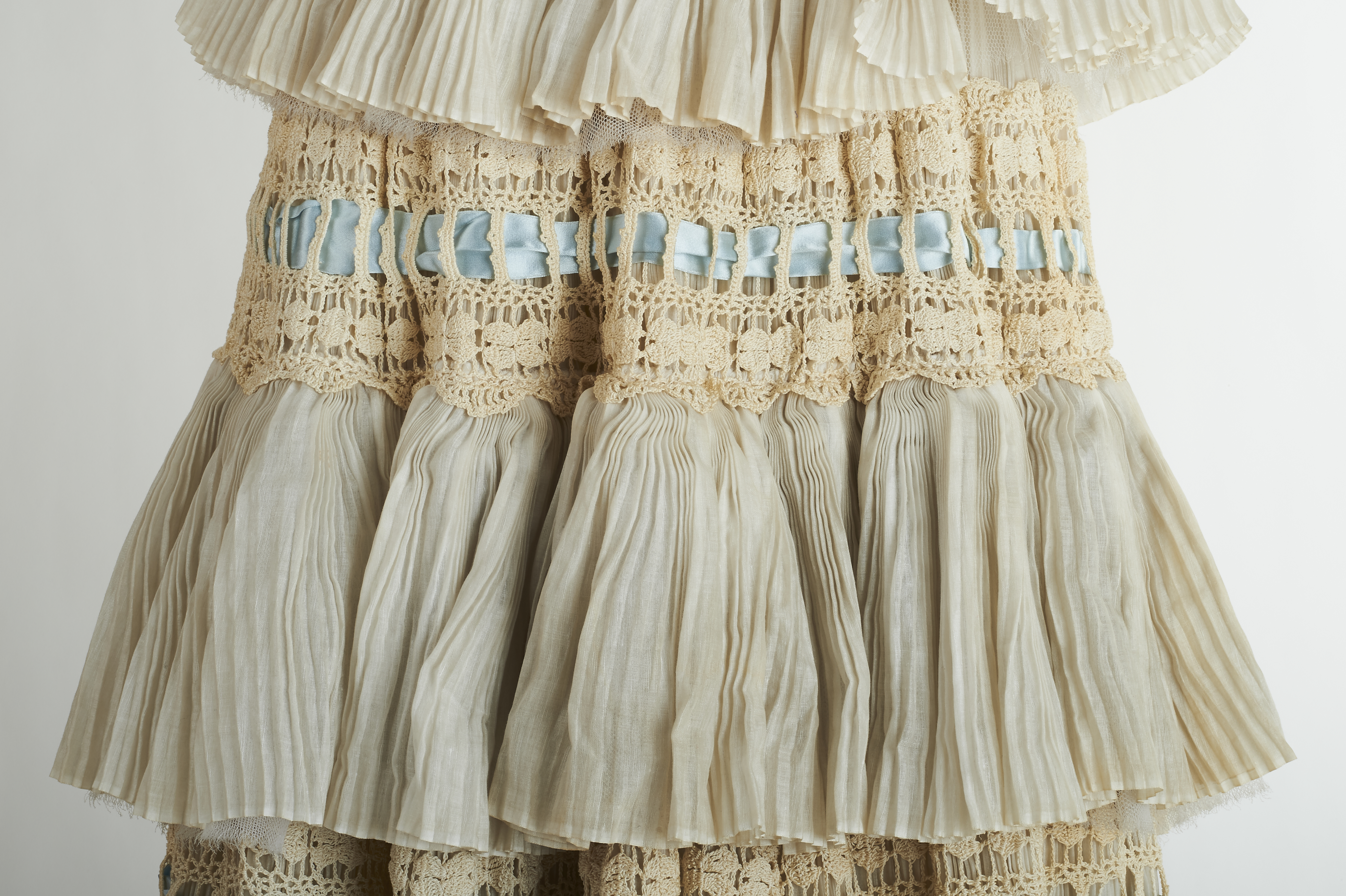
'Heiress' dress 1957 by Sybil Connolly - Ruffle detail

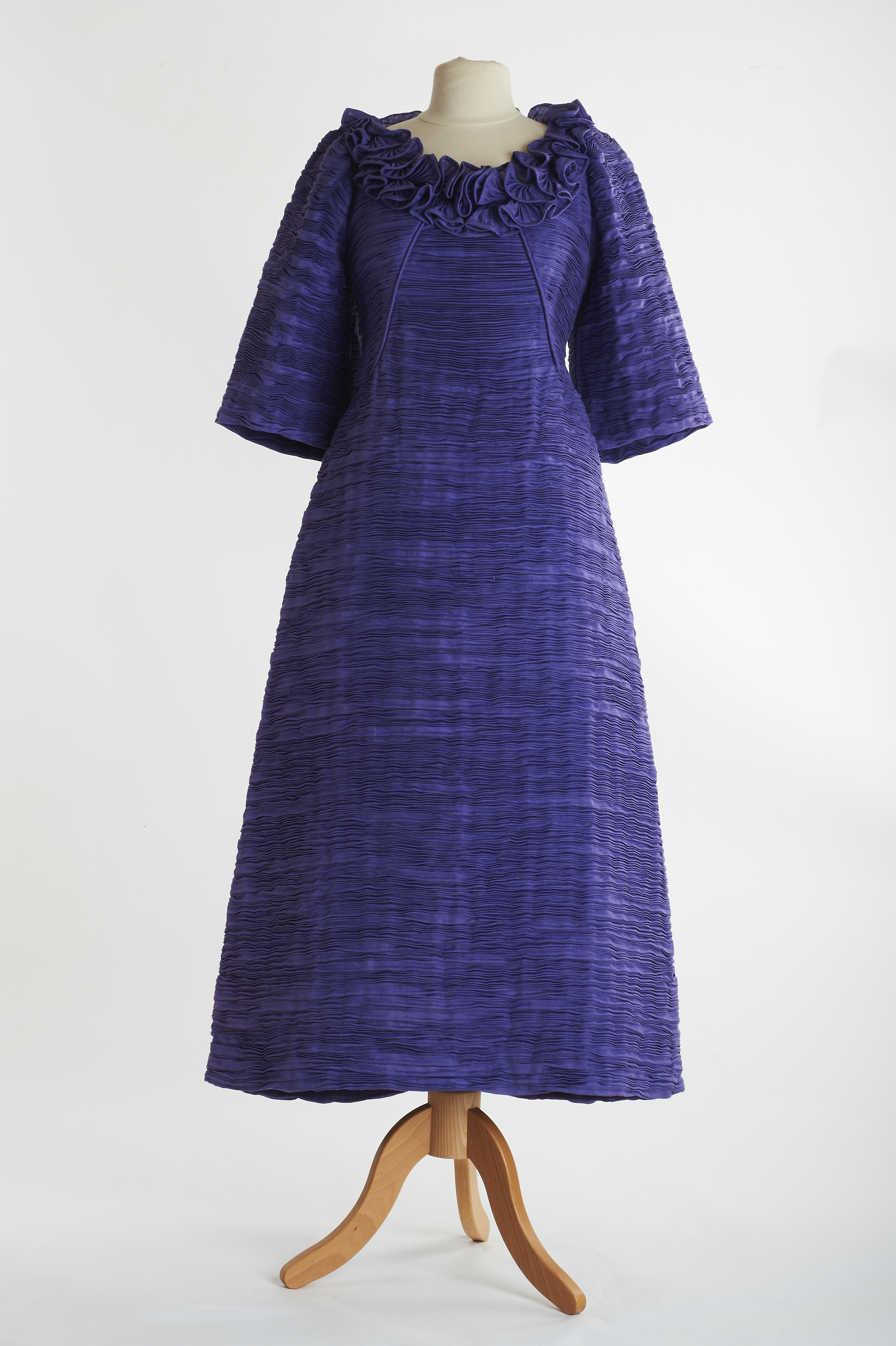
Lavender evening gown in pleated linen with 3/4 length sleeves and a frilled neckline by Sybil Connolly

== See also ==
- Delphos gown
