= TT319 =

Theban tomb

Theban tomb TT319
- Burial site of Neferu II
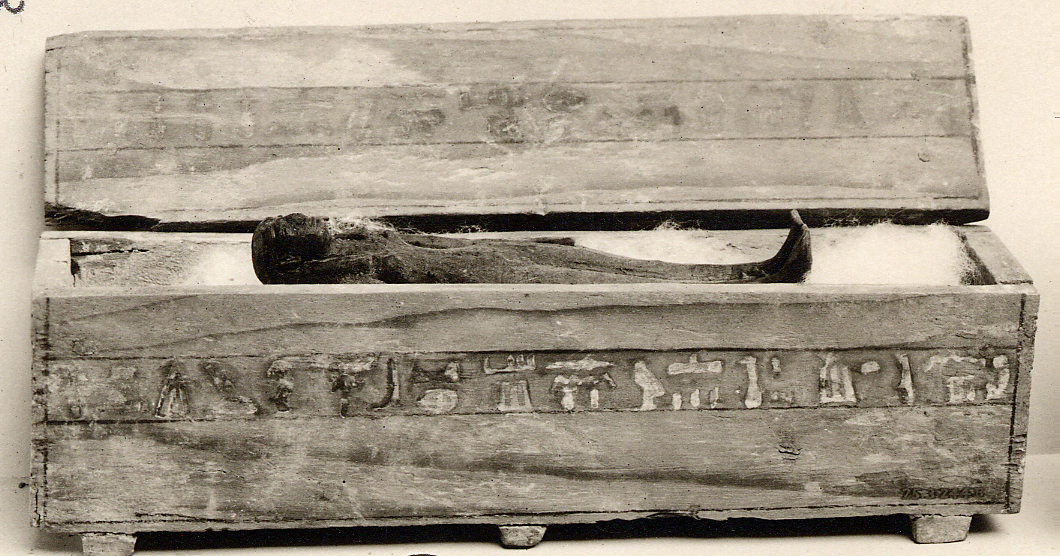
- Miniature coffin for funerary figurine of Queen Neferu

- Location within Egypt
- Coordinates: 25°44′18″N 32°36′27″E
- Location: Deir el-Bahari, Theban Necropolis
- Discovered: Eleventh Dynasty of Egypt
- Excavated by: Discovered by Naville, Excavated by Winlock (1924–25)
- Decoration: reliefs in chapel, paintings in burial chamber
- ← Previous; TT318 Next → TT320

F35 F35 F35
Nofru
in hieroglyphs
Era: New Kingdom
(1550–1069 BC)

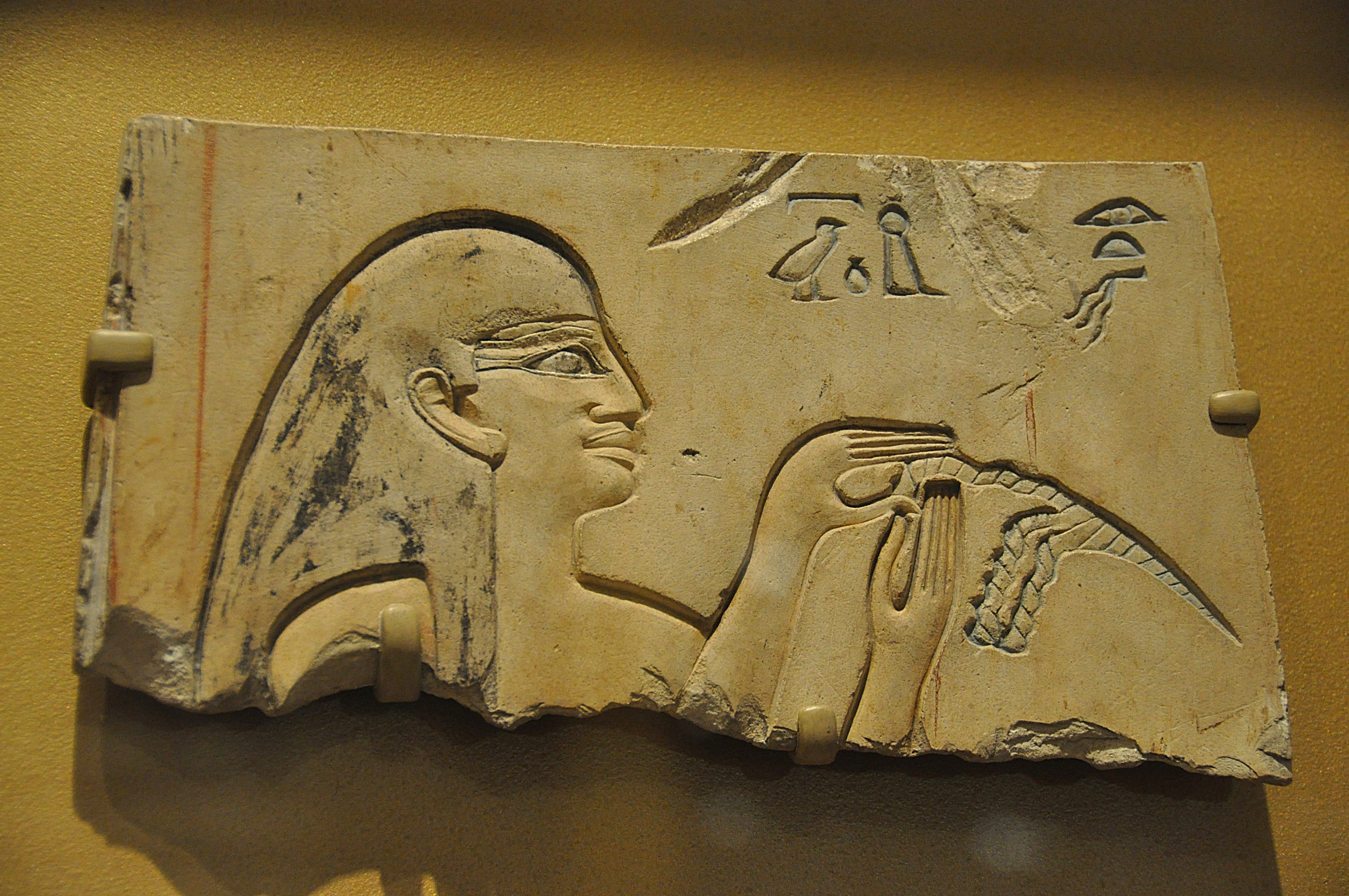
Relief fragment from the tomb, showing a hairdresser

The Theban Tomb TT319 (MMA 31) is located in Deir el-Bahari, part of the Theban Necropolis, on the west bank of the Nile, opposite to Luxor. The tomb belongs to the king's wife Neferu II, wife of the ancient Egyptian king Mentuhotep II (around 2000 BC). Neferu was the daughter of Queen Iah and Intef III.

The tomb of Neferu consisted of a chapel paved with slabs of limestone and carved into the rocks of Thebes. This chapel was decorated with scenes in sunken and raised relief. They show the queen with hairdressers, servants and religious scenes. However, today the scenes are only badly preserved. The stones of the chapel were already in ancient times used as quarry. These fragments are now in many museums around the world.

Behind the chapel there was a corridor leading to the burial chamber, which was also decorated. On the walls are painted friezes of burial goods and long funerary texts. In the burial chamber there also stood the sarcophagus of the queen. The chamber was found disturbed, when excavated.

The tomb is located just to the north of the mortuary temple of Mentuhotep II, and is currently under the temple of Hatshepsut. An entrance was left open in this later construction

== See also ==
- List of Theban tombs
