= El-Tarif =

Village and archaeological site in Egypt

Coordinates: 25°44′11″N 32°37′14″E

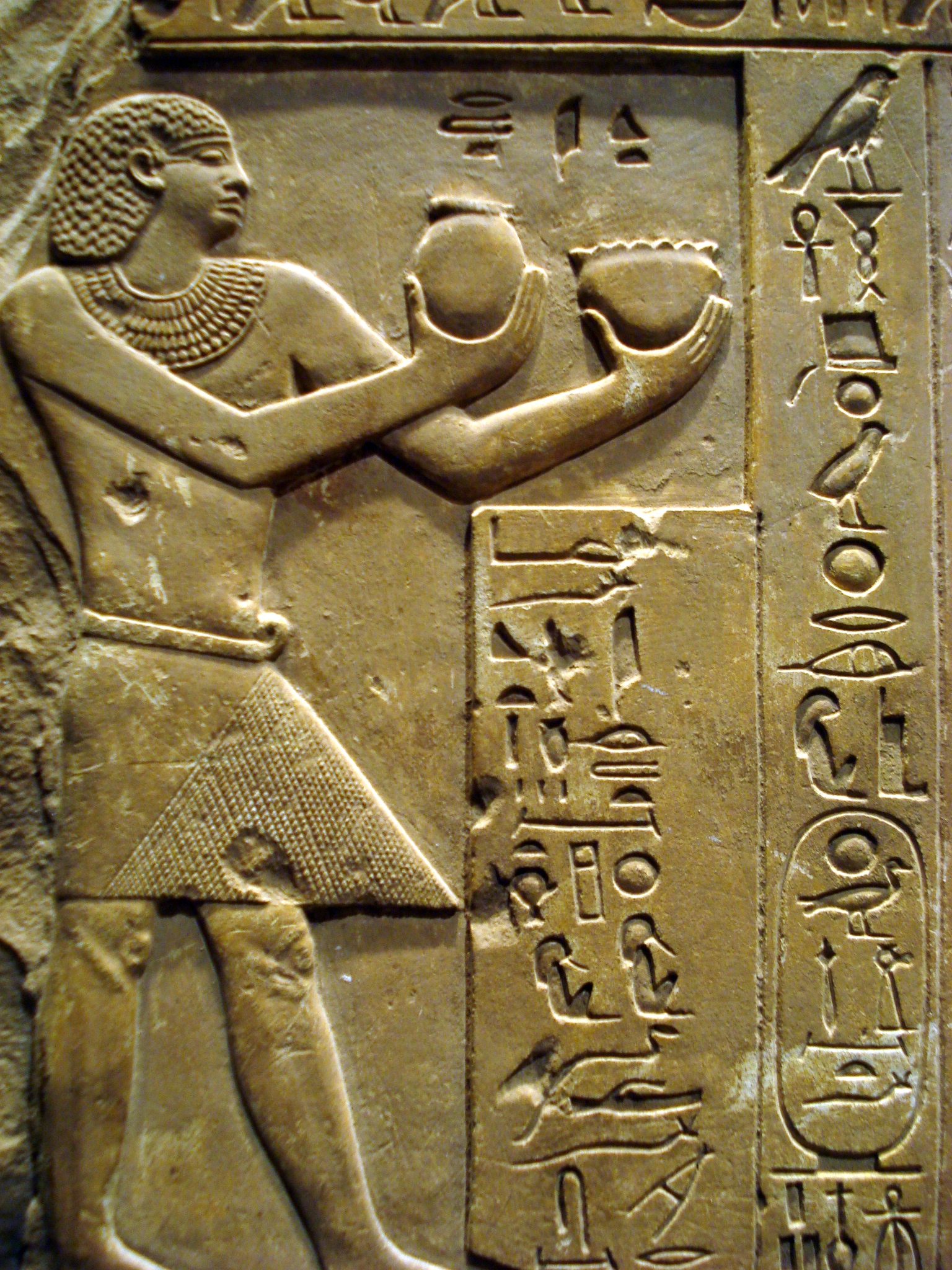
Funerary stele of Intef II made in limestone. First Intermediate Period, Dynasty XI, c. 2108–2059 BCE. From Thebes.

El-Tarif (Arabic: إلطارف aṭ-Ṭārif) is a necropolis on the West Bank of the Nile, at the site of ancient Thebes (Luxor), Egypt. It is located in the northwestern outskirts of Luxor and southeast of the Valley of the Kings, opposite Karnak, just to the southwest of the modern village of At-Tarif. It is the oldest of West Thebes' necropolises. It is a small mortuary temple, and the farthest north of the Tombs of the Nobles, and contains tombs of the late First Intermediate Period, Second Intermediate Period and early Middle Kingdom. Old Kingdom mastabas are possibly attributed to local rulers of the Fourth or Fifth Dynasty. Eleventh Dynasty (2040–1991 BCE) tombs of local rulers have also been noted in the form of a series of rock-cut tombs dated to 2061–2010 BCE, the largest of which are Intef I to Intef III, who were kings of this dynasty.

== Background ==
The El-Tarif tombs are located to the north on the West Bank of Luxor. Here are more than 30 known archaeological sites of temples have been discovered. This site is between Dendera and Gebelein on the flood plains of the Nile River, beyond Malqata in the south up to El-Tarif in the north. One access to the West Bank is across the new Nile Bridge and the other access is to cross the Nile by ferry from Luxor corniche to El-Gezira.

The Theban dynasty ruled from Thebes, which was the capital of Upper Egypt. Intef I was a local Egyptian ruler at Thebes. He was a member of the 11th Dynasty during the First Intermediate Period. He was the first ruler who adopted the title of Pharaoh. He was an important nomarch and his name finds mention in Thutmose III's chapel. Intef II who was also called a Pharaoh was his brother who ruled for 50 years from 2112 to 2063 BCE. This dynasty developed a particular type of burial tombs which were called the saff-tomb or portico-tomb; saff in Arabic means "rows". These were built by the rulers of the New Kingdom and they buried their dead in saff-tombs at the necropolis at El-Tarif. All of their tombs are in dilapidated condition, given their age.

== Features ==
Eleventh Dynasty tombs of local rulers have also been noted. Saff tombs, formed of rock, are local to the area, but particularly noted at El-Tarif, where the largest belongs to Intef I–III (Eleventh Dynasty). The forecourts, cut 4–5 metres (13–16 ft) into the desert floor, were as large as 300 by 75 metres (984 ft × 246 ft), for example in the case of Intef I's tomb. Private tombs of white plaster and decorated with stelae, numbering at least 250, are situated are those belonging to kings.

Intef I, Intef II and Intef III were all buried in a saff (row) tomb in El Tarif in a row close to the Deir el-Bahri which is the location of the Mentuhotep II's Mortuary Temple.
