= Spence Bryson =

- Industry: Textiles
- Founded: 1885; 141 years ago
- Founders: John Bell Bryson and Thomas Henry Spence
- Headquarters: Portadown, Northern Ireland

Spence Bryson is a Northern Irish textile company which manufactures and distributes linen and linen products.

== History ==
Spence Bryson was founded as Spence, Bryson & Co. Ltd in 1885 by John Bell Bryson and Thomas Henry Spence in Portadown, County Armagh. John Bell Bryson (c.1859-1923) was born in County Down, and apprenticed in the linen trade to Robert Glass of Portadown, while Thomas Henry Spence (c.1854-1937) was born in County Armagh, and was apprenticed to Hamilton Robb in Portadown.

By the 1950s, Spence Bryson was the largest of the 11 weaving companies based in the Portadown area and was based on Meadow Lane. The company was bought by Ulster Weavers Ltd in 1990.

The company is known for its manufacture of a range of linen fabrics, from light linen to suit fabric, and for its self-sufficiency, sourcing local wood for their looms and locally cast iron. In the 20th century, the sales division was organised into 3 sections: embroidery cloth, handkerchiefs, and suiting. In the 1950s, Spence Bryson worked with fashion designer Sybil Connolly to develop her signature pleated linen from handkerchief linen.
