= Mentuhotep I =

Ancient Egyptian nomarch

- Nomarch of the 4th nome of Upper Egypt
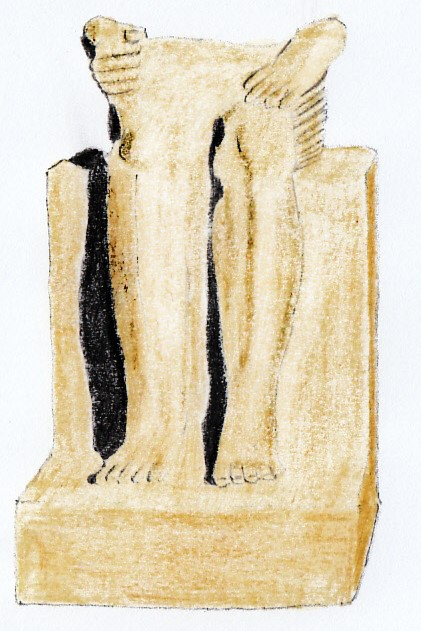
- Sitting statue of Mentuhotep I from Elephantine, now in Cairo
Egyptian name
Royal titulary
Horus name
Hor Tepia
Ḥr.(w)-tp [j] ˁ
Horus the ancestor (posthumous)
G5	D1 p D36 Z1
Nomen
Mentuhotepaa
mnṯw-ḥtp(w)ˁ3
Mentuhotep the great (litt. Montu is content, the great)
< mn n V13 w Htp t p O29V >
Alternative form: Itnetjeru Mentuhotepaa Merysatetnebetabu
It-nṯrw mnṯw-ḥtp(w)ˁ3 mry sṯt nbt Abw
Father of the gods, Mentuhotep the great, beloved of Satet, lady of Abu
< M17 t Z1 f R8A Y5 n V13 w R4 t p O29V s sti t t nb t Ab b w N25 O49 mr M17 M17 >
- Tenure: c. 2135 BC
- Predecessor: Intef the Elder
- Successor: Intef I
- Dynasty: 11th dynasty
- Spouse: Queen Neferu I
- Father: possibly Intef the Elder
- Children: Intef I ? Intef II ?

Mentuhotep I (also Mentuhotep-aa, i.e. "the Great") may have been a Theban nomarch and independent ruler of Upper Egypt during the early First Intermediate Period. Alternatively, Mentuhotep I may be a fictional figure created during the later Eleventh Dynasty, which rose to prominence under Intef II and Mentuhotep II, playing the role of a founding father.

== Identity ==
Mentuhotep was possibly a local Egyptian nomarch at Thebes during the early first intermediate period, c. 2135 BC. The Karnak king list found in the Festival Hall of Thutmose III preserves, in position No. 12, the partial name "Men-" in a royal cartouche, along with being accompanied by the Horus name "Tepia", meaning "the ancestor", which is still visible next to it, making it distinct from those of Mentuhotep II (No. 29) or Mentuhotep III (No. 30). The available fragments of the Karnak list do not seem to represent past pharaohs in any chronological order, and thus one cannot ascertain if or when this "Men-" pharaoh lived. Many scholars have argued from the list that a Mentuhotep I, who might have been merely a Theban nomarch, was posthumously given a royal titulary by his successors; thus this conjectured personage is referred to conventionally as "Mentuhotep I".

The fact that no contemporary monument can safely be attributed to a king "Mentuhotep I" has led some Egyptologists to propose that he is a fictional ancestor and founder of the Eleventh dynasty, invented for that purpose during the later part of the dynasty.

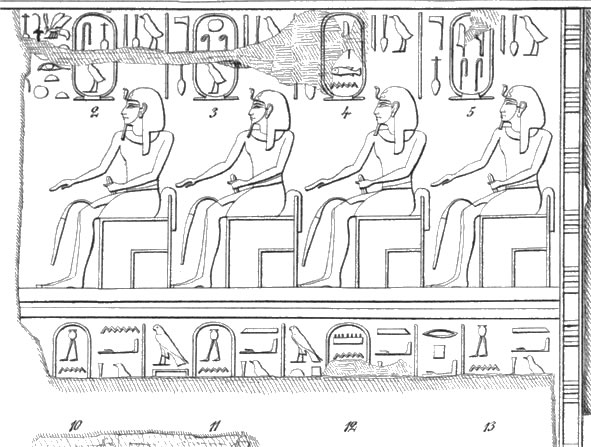
Karnak king list showing the partial name "Men..." in a cartouche (No. 12)

On the base of a statue from the sanctuary of Heqaib on Elephantine, a Mentuhotep is referred to as "Father of the gods". This title probably refers to Mentuhotep's immediate successors, Intef I and Intef II who reigned as kings over Upper Egypt. From this title, many Egyptologists argued that this Mentuhotep was probably the father of Intef I and II, and also that he was never a pharaoh, as this title was usually reserved for the non-royal ancestors of pharaohs.

The throne name of Mentuhotep is unknown; since he might not have been a king, or no subsequent 11th Dynasty king bore any throne name until Mentuhotep II, it is probable that he never had one. His Horus name Tepi-a, "The ancestor" was certainly given to him posthumously.

== Family ==
Mentuhotep's wife might have been Neferu I and the statue from Heqaib may be interpreted to show that he was the father of Intef I and II. The Karnak king list has apparently one non-royal personage (without cartouche), named Intef, in position no. 13. This could possibly refer to Intef the elder, son of Iku, a Theban nomarch loyal to the Herakleopolitan kings in the early first intermediate period. However, the kings on the remaining fragments are not listed in chronological order, so this is not at all certain.

== Reign ==
As Theban nomarch, Mentuhotep's dominion perhaps extended south to the first cataract. Mentuhotep might hypothetically have formed an alliance with the nomarch of Coptos, which then brought his successor Intef I to war with the Herakleopolitan kings of the 10th Dynasty ruling over Lower Egypt and their powerful nomarch allies in Middle Egypt, in particular Ankhtifi.

Preceded by Intef the Elder	Nomarch of Thebes; Eleventh Dynasty	Succeeded by Intef I
