= Neferu II =

nfr nfr nfr
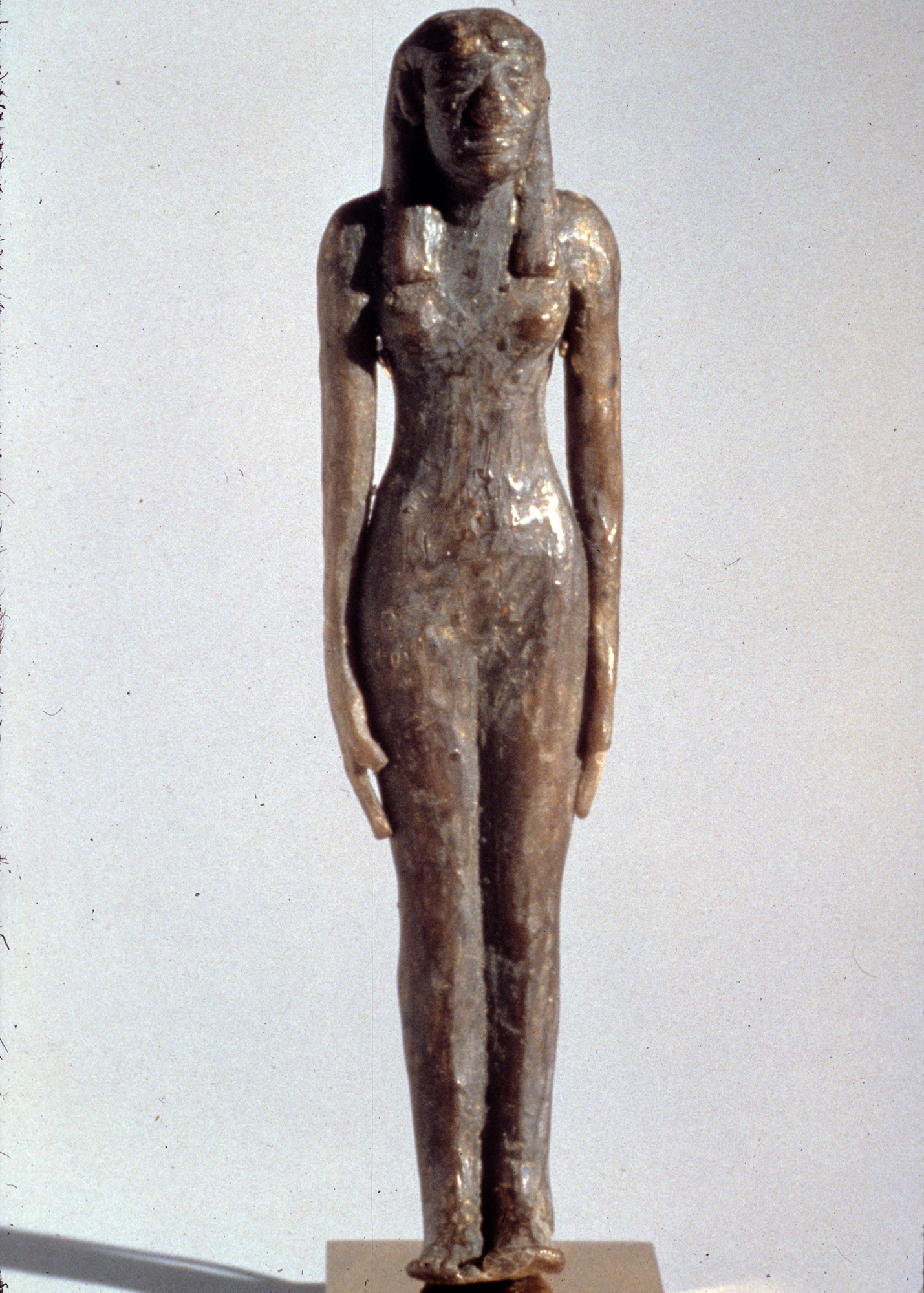
- Funerary figurine of Neferu made from wax, from TT319. Metropolitan Museum of Art, New York.

Queen consort of Egypt
- Tenure: c. 2050 BC
- King: Mentuhotep II
- Burial: TT319, Deir el-Bahari, Egypt
- Spouse: Mentuhotep II
- Dynasty: 11th Dynasty
- Father: Intef III
- Mother: Iah

Neferu II (fl. c. 2050 BC) was the wife and sister of the ancient Egyptian king Mentuhotep II who ruled in the 11th Dynasty.

== Biography ==
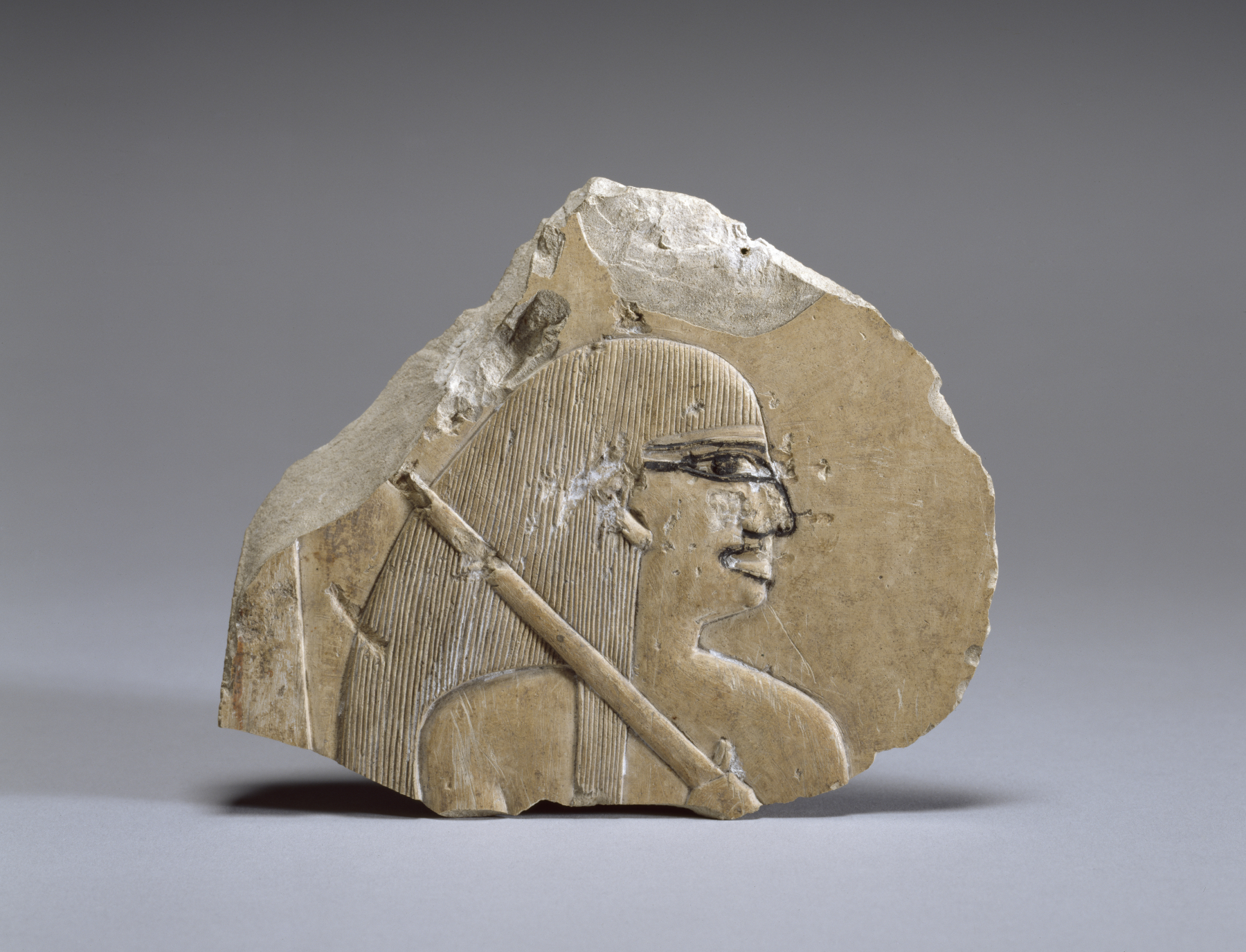
Relief of a woman carrying a sunshade, found in Neferu's tomb TT319. Walters Art Museum.

Neferu II held the titles king's wife and king's daughter. The inscriptions in the tomb mention that she was the daughter of the king's mother Iah who was the mother of king Mentuhotep II. She was therefore his sister. It is known that Mentuhotep II was the son of king Intef III who was most likely the father of Neferu.

== Death and burial ==
Neferu is mainly known from her tomb (TT319) at Deir el-Bahari. The tomb was found badly destroyed but the decorated burial chamber was well preserved and many fragments from the reliefs in the tomb chapel were found.

== Ancestry ==
Ancestors of Neferu II

Intef II
Neferu I
Intef III
Neferu II
Iah

== Literature ==
- Joyce Tyldesley: Chronicle of the Queens of Egypt. Thames & Hudson. 2006, ISBN 0-500-05145-3, p. 67.
