= Intef I =

Pharaoh of ancient Egypt (11th Dynasty)

- Antef, Inyotef, Anjotef, Anyotef, Enyotef
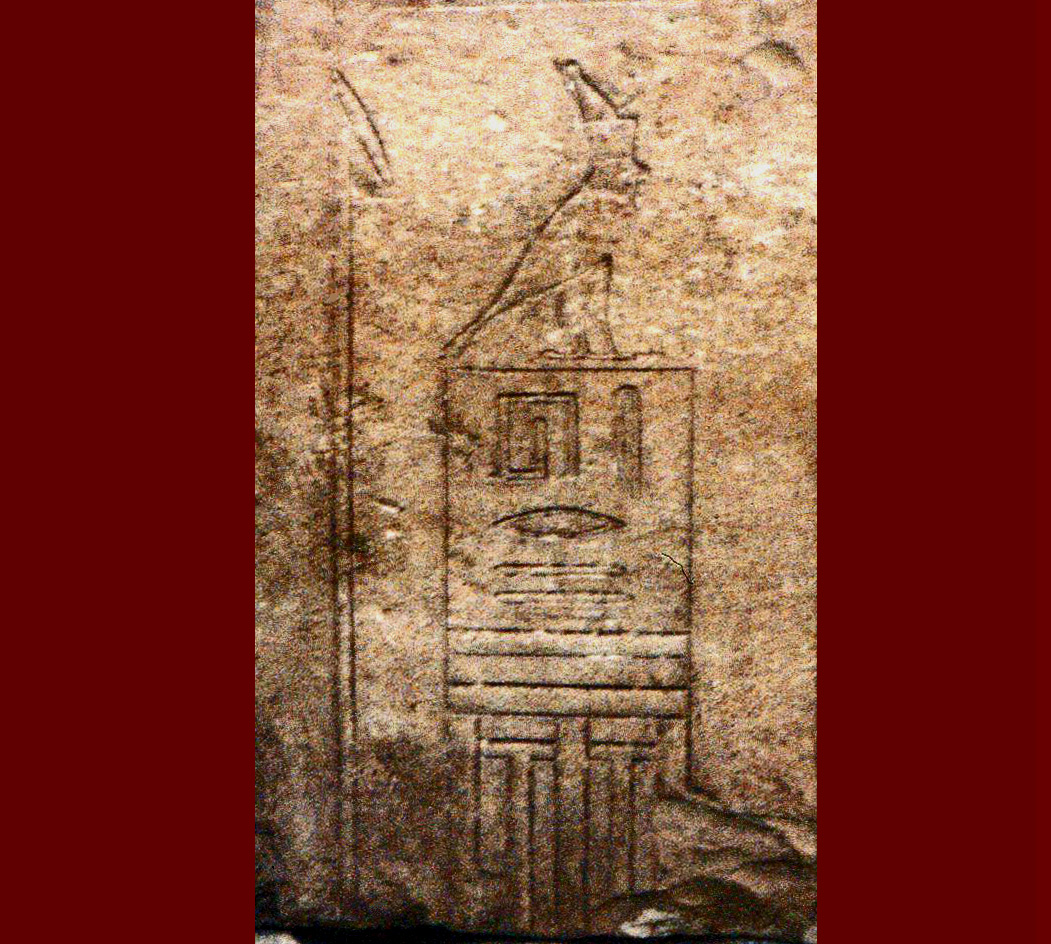
- Serekh of Intef I reading "Horus Sehertawy", inscribed posthumously for him by Mentuhotep II in the Temple of Montu at Tod, now in the Egyptian Museum

Nomarch of Thebes and Pharaoh
- Reign: 4 to 16 years, 2134–2118 BC, c. 2120 BC or c. 2070 BC
- Predecessor: Mentuhotep I
- Successor: Intef II
Royal titulary
Horus name
Sehertawy
Shr-tȝ.wy
Horus, Maker of peace in the two lands
G5	S29 O4 D21 Y1 N16 N16
Nomen
Sa-Re Intef
Sȝ-rˁ-in-it.f
Son of Ra, Intef (litt. His father brought him)
< G39 N5 W25 n&t&f >
- Father: uncertain, most probably Mentuhotep I
- Mother: Neferu I
- Burial: Saff tomb at El-Tarif known as "Saff el-Dawba"
- Dynasty: 11th Dynasty

Sehertawy Intef I was a local nomarch at Thebes during the early First Intermediate Period and later an ancient Egyptian pharaoh. He was the first member of the 11th Dynasty to lay claim to a Horus name. Intef reigned from four to 16 years c. 2120 BC or c. 2070 BC, during which time he probably waged war with his northern neighbor, the Coptite nomarch Tjauti. Intef was buried in a saff tomb at El-Tarif, known today as Saff el-Dawaba.

== Family ==
Intef's parents may possibly have been Mentuhotep I and Neferu I. He was the elder brother of Intef II, who succeeded him.

== Reign ==
=== Rise of the Kingdom of Waset (Thebes) ===
Sehertawy Intef I was the first member of his Dynasty to assume a pharaonic title with the Horus name of Sehertawy variously rendered as "Maker of peace in the two lands", "He who has brought calm to the two Lands" and "Pacifier of the two lands".

By taking a Horus name with both crowns, Intef declared himself ruler of all Egypt. However, his authority was contested by the other nomarchs of Egypt, chief among them being the 10th Dynasty rulers at Herakleopolis Magna who also laid claim to the title of pharaoh and their powerful ally Ankhtifi, nomarch of Hierakonpolis, and a faithful follower of the Herakleopolitan Dynasty. On his accession to the Theban throne, Intef probably ruled only the Theban (fourth) nome, but it is conjectured that after defeating Ankhtifi or one of his successors, Intef acquired the three nomes to the south of Thebes, down to Elephantine, and to the north all territories south of the border with the Coptite nome. Alternatively, this may have been achieved by Intef's predecessor Mentuhotep I. Both hypotheses remain conjectural given the paucity of historical records on this period.

Intef I got rapidly embroiled in a war with his northern neighbors. A graffito discovered by the Theban Desert Road Survey in the Gebel Tjauti northwest of Thebes reports the presence there of "the assault troops of the son of Ra, Intef". It has been posited that this inscription refers to Intef I whose soldiers were fighting the Coptite nomarch Tjauti. In support of this hypothesis is a nearby worn out stele erected by Tjauti reporting the construction of a road to allow his people to cross the desert "which the ruler of another nome had sealed off [when he came in order to] fight with my nome...". Although not named explicitly, Darell Baker and other Egyptologists contend that this ruler must either be Intef I or his successor Intef II. In any case, the subsequent defeat of Tjauti ultimately put Coptos, Dendera and the three nomes of Hierakonpolis under Theban control, expanding the Theban kingdom 250 km northward with a border near Abydos.

Intef I was succeeded by his brother Intef II who pursued the war with the northern neighbors of the Theban kingdom.

== Attestations ==
There are no contemporary monuments which can be positively attributed to Intef I.

A possible exception is a short inscription discovered in the western desert: "the assault troops of the son of Re, Intef". In the original publication of the inscription this king Intef is identified with Intef I, although Intef II has also been proposed as a possibility. The inscription is located in the vicinity of an inscription commissioned by the contemporary Coptite nomarch named Tjauti (see below).

=== Temple of Mentu ===
Intef is known for certain from only one near-contemporary monument: two inscribed blocks from the temple of Montu at Tod which were erected during Mentuhotep II's reign. The blocks represent Mentuhotep II facing the names of three of his ancestors which are identified by their proper name (nomen) and Horus name. These are Intef (I) Sehertawy, Intef (II) Wahankh and Intef (III) Nakht-neb-tep-nefer (although in this case only the Horus names Sehertawy and Wahankh are preserved). This relief establishes the succession of kings of the 11th Dynasty.

=== King Lists ===
Intef I is most likely attested on later king lists, but this remains uncertain as his name is either lost or damaged. In the Karnak king list a king Intef appears next to "Men...", most likely Mentuhotep I, as part of the latter's Horus name, "the ancestor", is still visible. The few remains of Intef I's Horus name fit to Sehertawy.

The name and duration of the reign of Intef I are not preserved in the Turin Canon, although from an analysis of the available space, it is possible that Intef I was mentioned in what is now a lacuna affecting entry 5.13. The durations of the reigns of the other 11th Dynasty kings are preserved in the Turin Canon and add up to 127 years. Furthermore, the summary of reigns of this dynasty is also preserved in the Turin Canon and is given as 143 years. On the strength of these much later fragments, the two lost reigns of Mentuhotep I and Intef I have been calculated to add up to 16 years, further implying that Intef's reign lasted for less than 16 years. Thus the duration of Intef's reign is often reported to be between four and 16 years.

== Burial ==
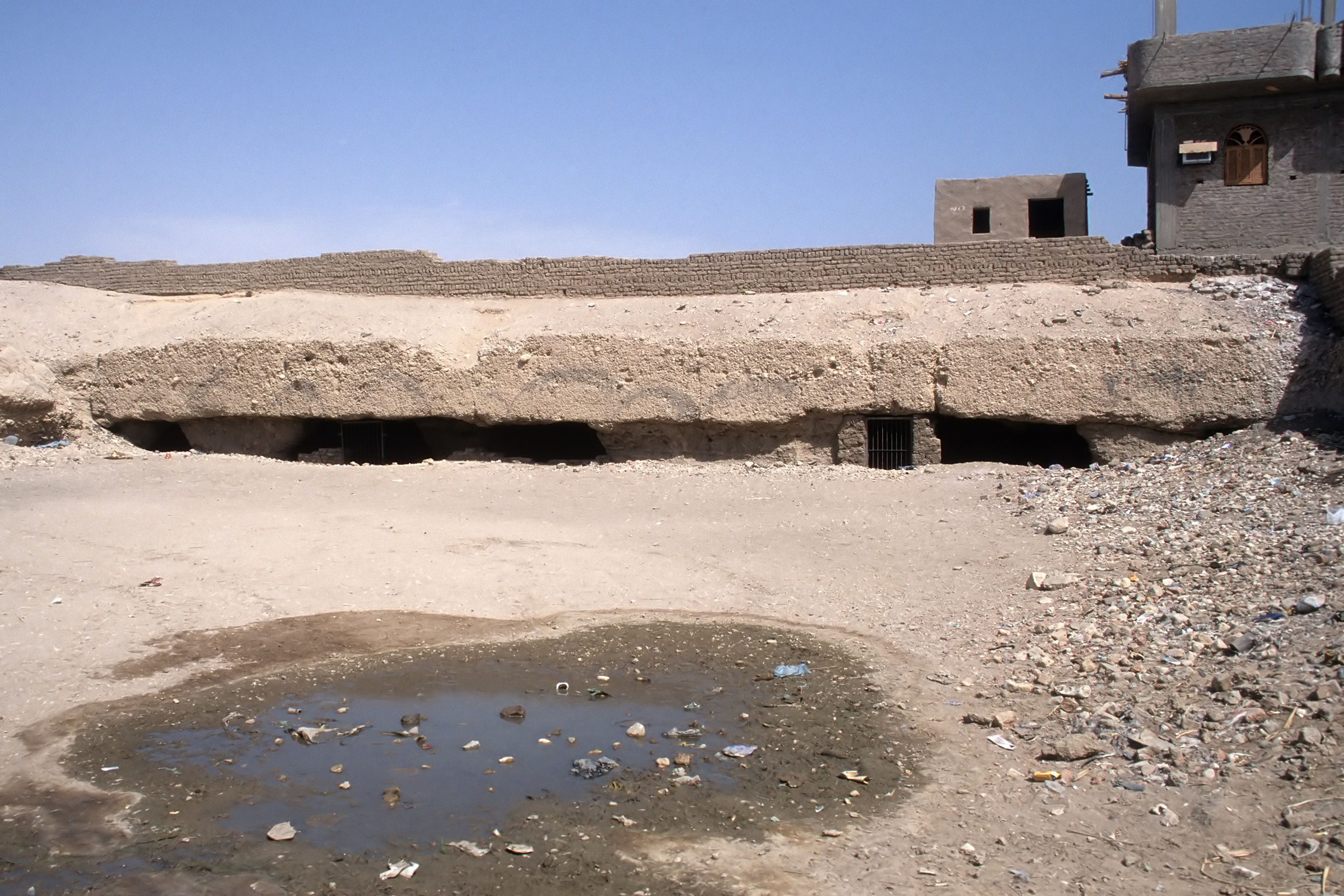
Court of the saff tomb of Intef I, at Saff el-Dawaba

At El-Tariff, the Saff Tomb of Intef I is a funerary complex dug into a hill side on the opposite bank of the Nile, today known as Saff el-Dawaba.

The site of El-Tarif comprises three monumental royal tombs, known as saff tombs. Inscriptions found in one tomb indicate that it belonged to Wahankh Intef II, Intef I's successor. At the opposite, the Saff el-Dawaba is devoid of inscriptions but yielded the earliest type of pottery found at El-Tarif and, for this reason, is most often assigned to Intef I.

The Saff el-Dawaba comprises a large 300-by-75-metre (984 ft × 246 ft) sunken courtyard backed by a colonnade leading to a mortuary chapel carved into the hill and flanked by two chambers. The burial chamber of Intef I was dug beneath the mortuary chapel. Nowadays, the tomb lies beneath the constructions of a village.

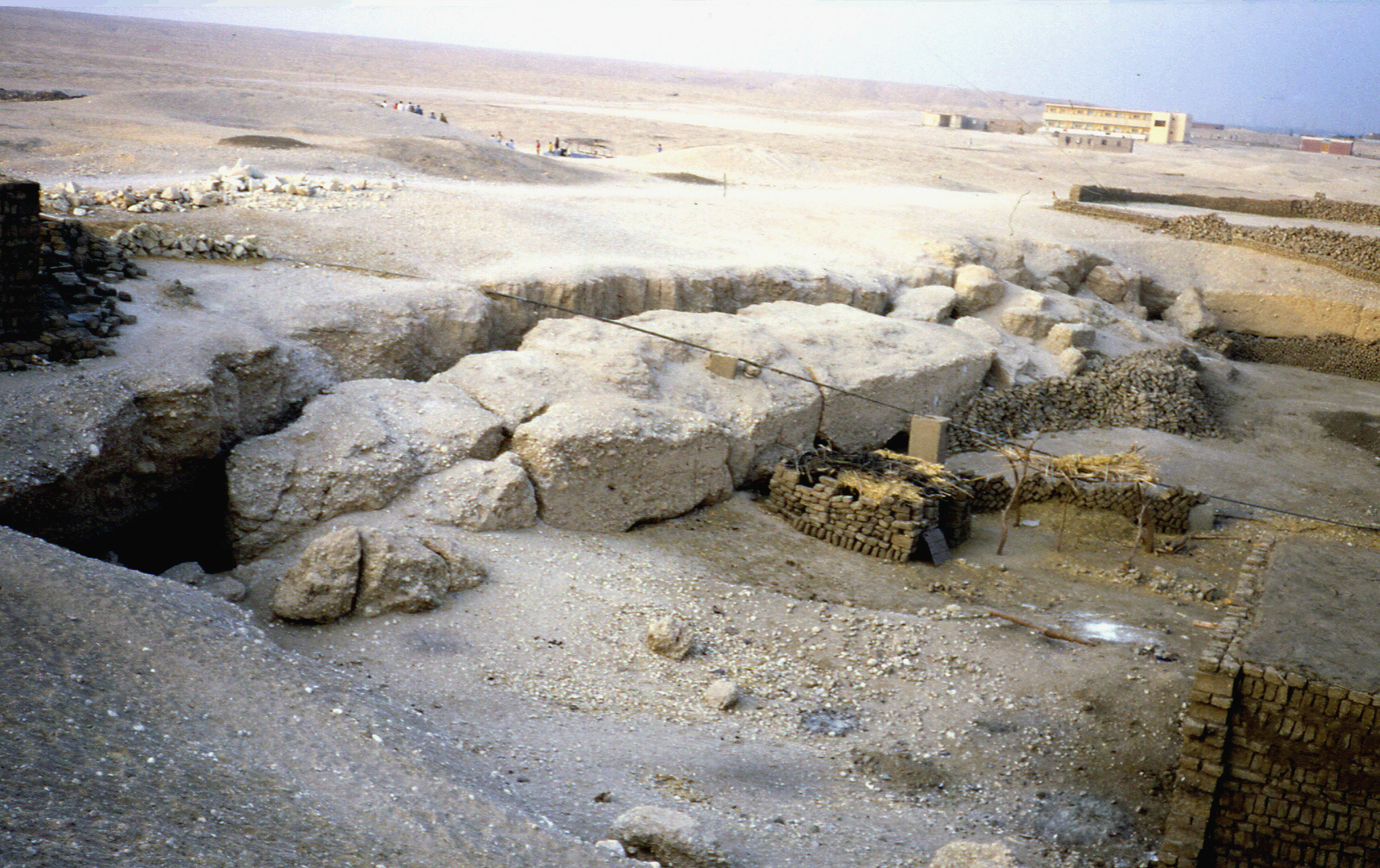
Court of the tomb of Intef I

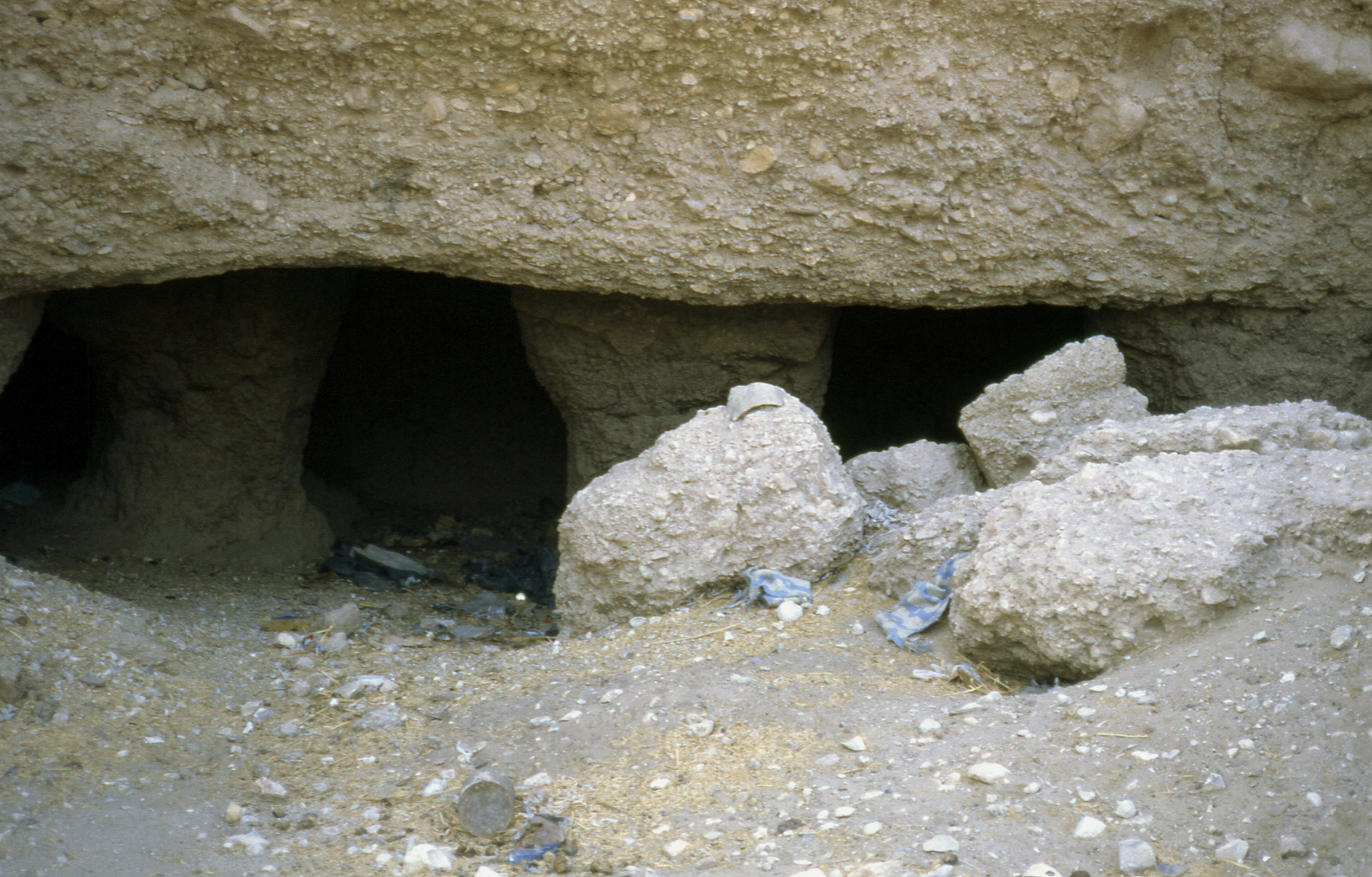
Portico of the tomb, columns half buried in the sand

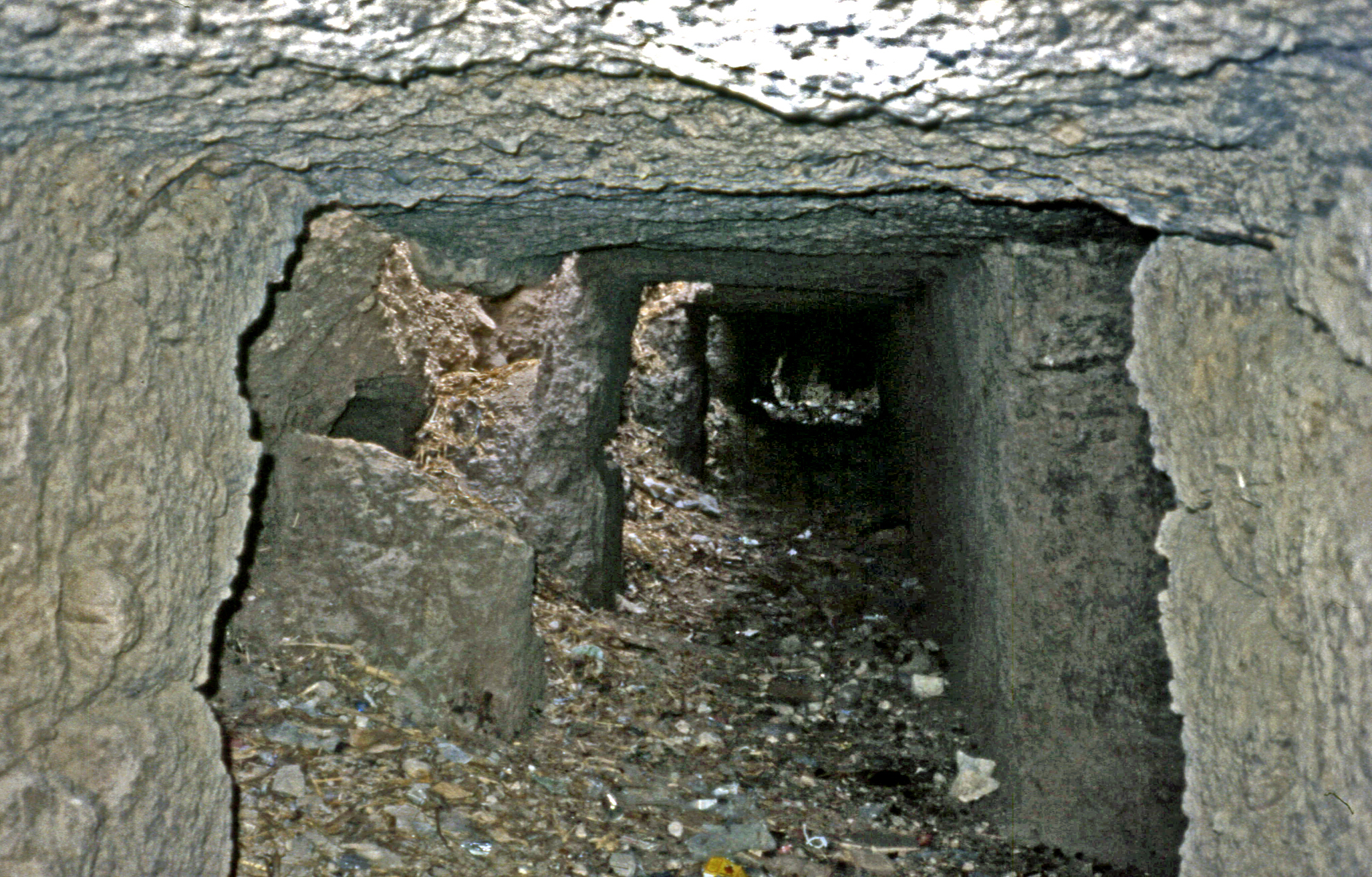
Pillared gallery in front of the burial chamber

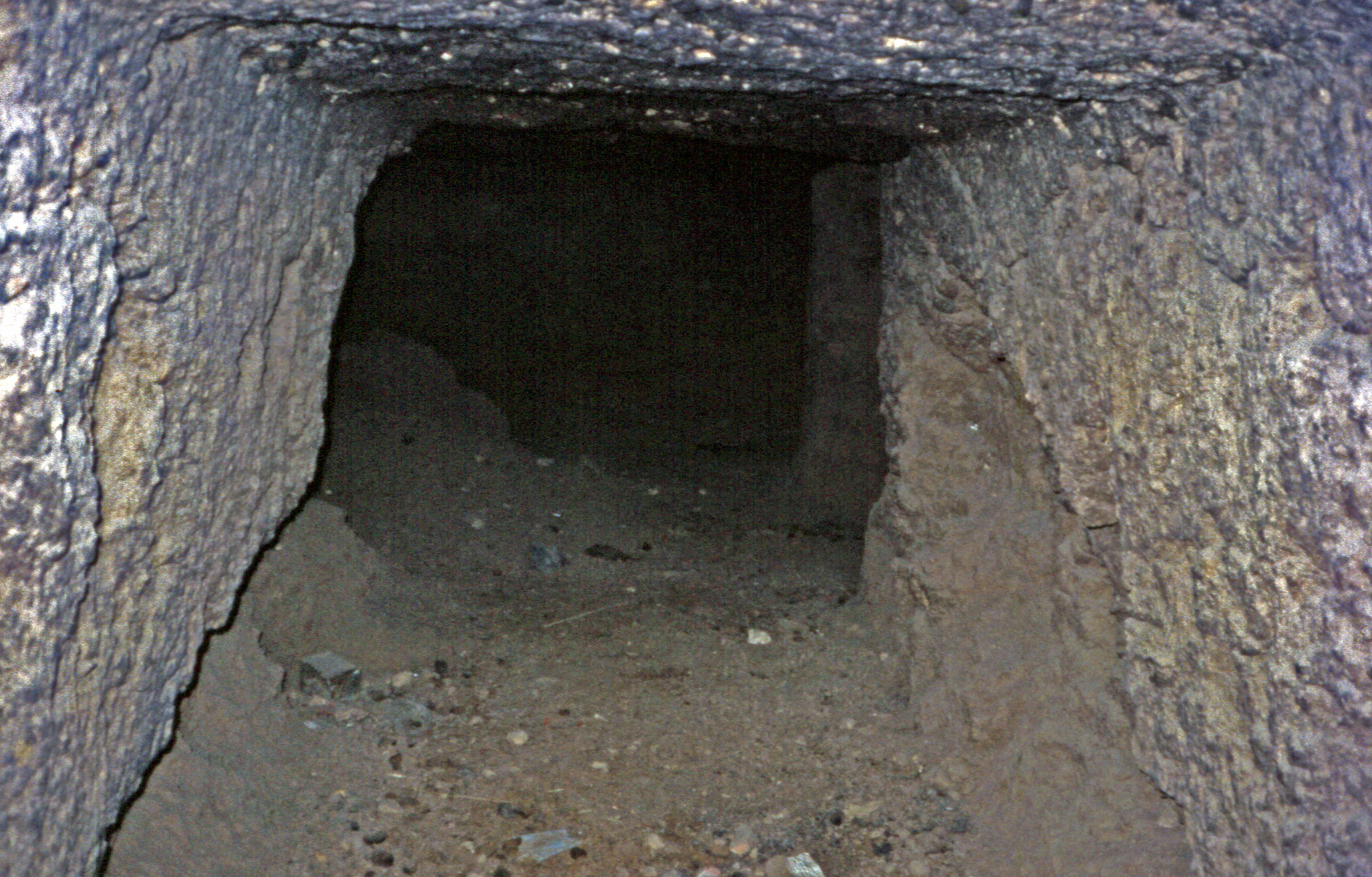
Burial chamber

Preceded by As nomarch of Thebes: Mentuhotep I	Pharaoh of Egypt; Eleventh Dynasty	Succeeded by Intef II
