= Neferukayet =

Ancient Egyptian queen consort

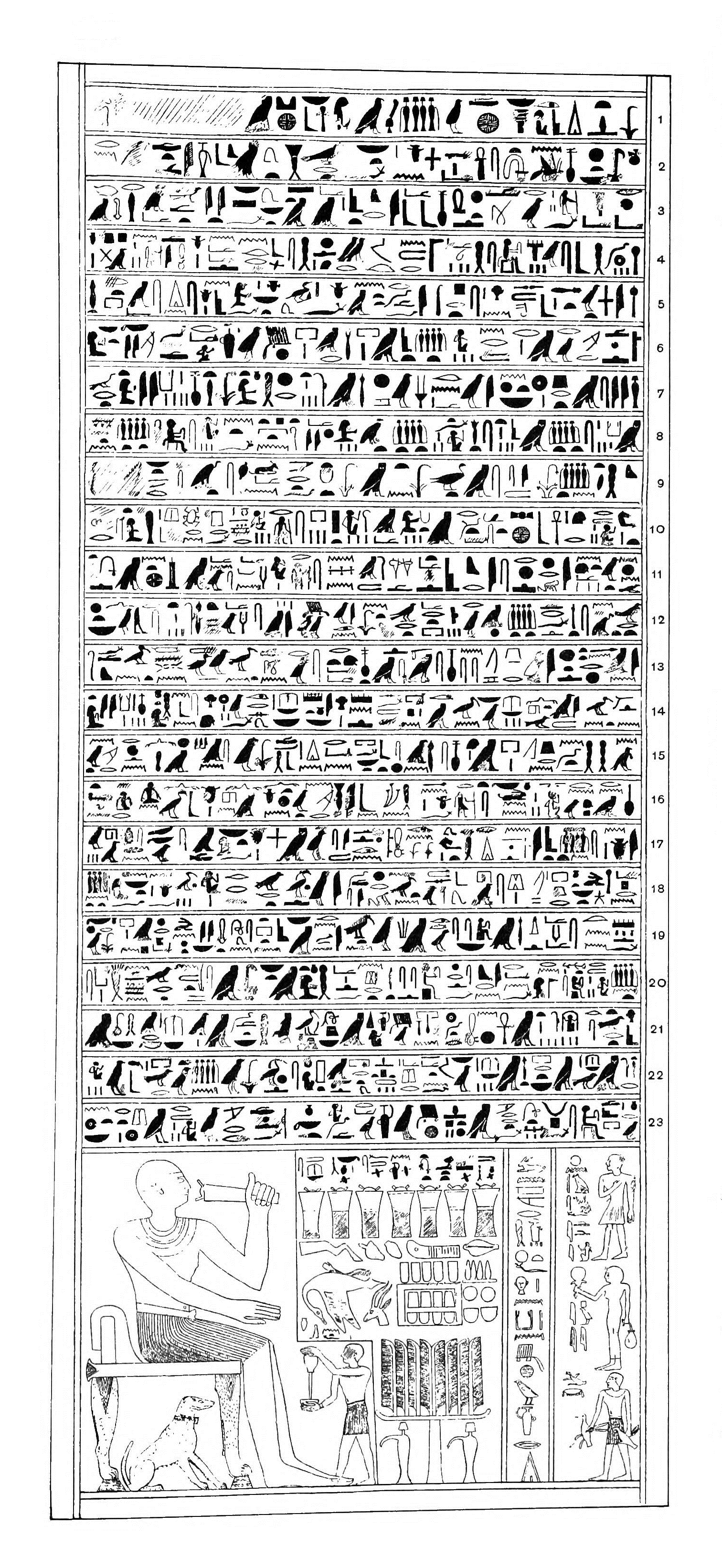
Stela of Rediukhnum, steward of Neferukayet (Cairo 20543)

nfr Z1 Z2 kA Z1 i i t B1
Neferukayet
in hieroglyphs
Era: 1st Intermediate Period
(2181–2055 BC)

Neferukayet was an ancient Egyptian princess and queen of the Eleventh Dynasty.

Her name is only known from her steward Rediukhnum's stela, which was found in Dendera (now in the Egyptian Museum in Cairo, CG 20543). She is possibly identical with the mother of Intef III, whose name was Neferu. Neferukayet also bore the titles "king's daughter" (z3.t-nỉsw.t), "king's beloved wife" (ḥm.t-nỉsw.t mrỉỉ.t=f) and "royal ornament" (ẖkr.t-nỉsw.t), based on this, she was likely the daughter of Intef I and the wife of Intef II.

Furthermore, in the tomb of king Intef III was found a relief fragment naming a woman called Neferukau. Silke Roth argued that Neferukau is just a different writing for the name Neferukayet. Neferu would be just a short version of the name Neferukau/Neferukayet.
