= Intef II =

Egyptian ruler (r. 2112–2063 BC)

- Inyotef II, Antef II, Si-Rêˁ In-ˁo
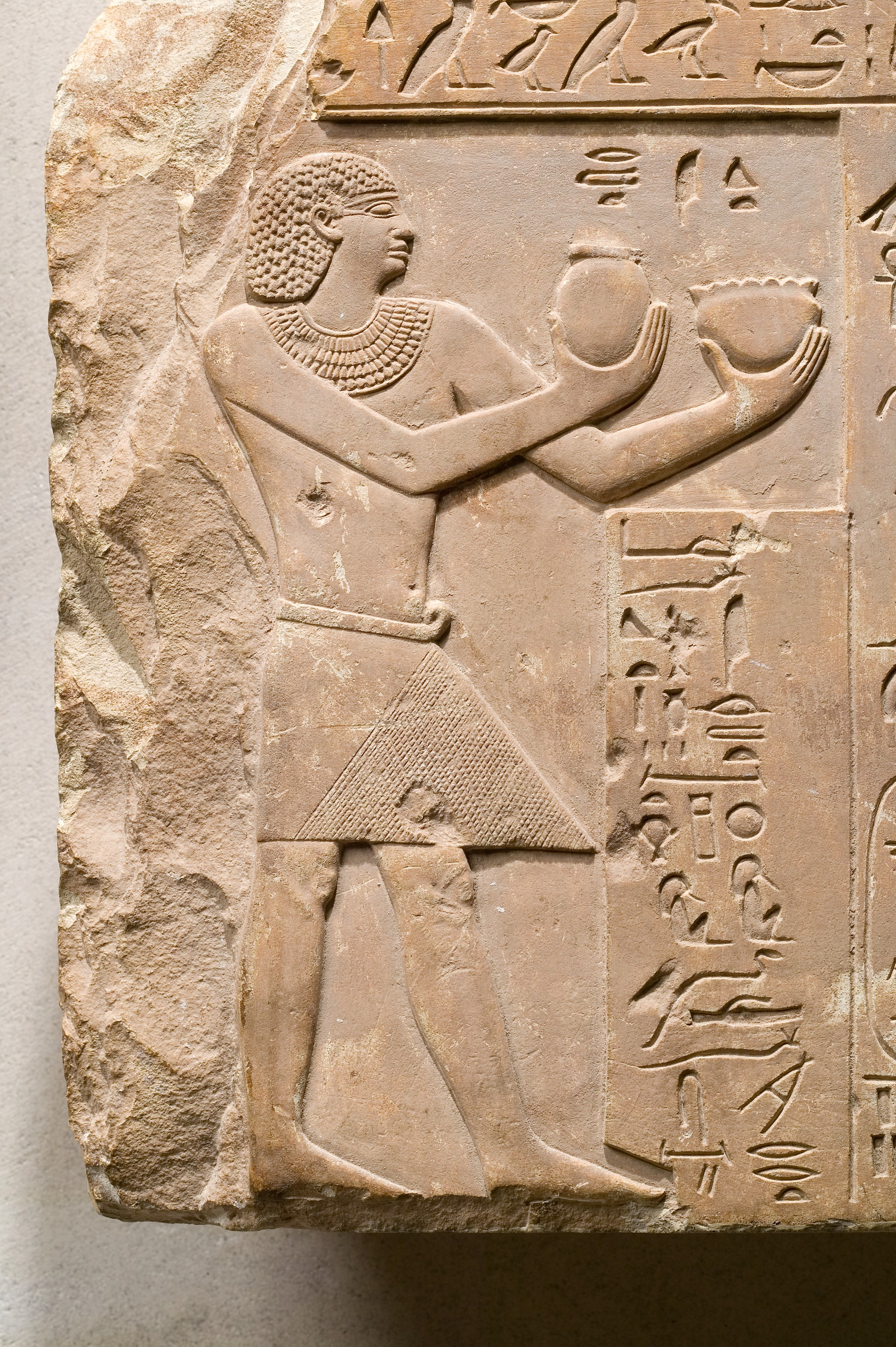
- Funerary stele of Intef II, on display at the Metropolitan Museum of Art

Pharaoh
- Reign: 49 regnal years 2112–2063 BC
- Predecessor: Intef I
- Successor: Intef III
Royal titulary
Horus name
Wahankh
W3ḥ-ˁnḫ
Horus, Strong in life
G5	V29 S34
Nomen
Sa Re Intef
Jnj (j)t.=f
The Son of Ra Intef (litt. His father brought him)

G39 N5	W25 n&t&f
- Consort: Possibly Neferukayet
- Children: Intef III; Iah
- Father: Mentuhotep I
- Mother: Neferu I
- Died: 2063 BC
- Burial: El-Tarif, near Thebes
- Dynasty: 11th Dynasty

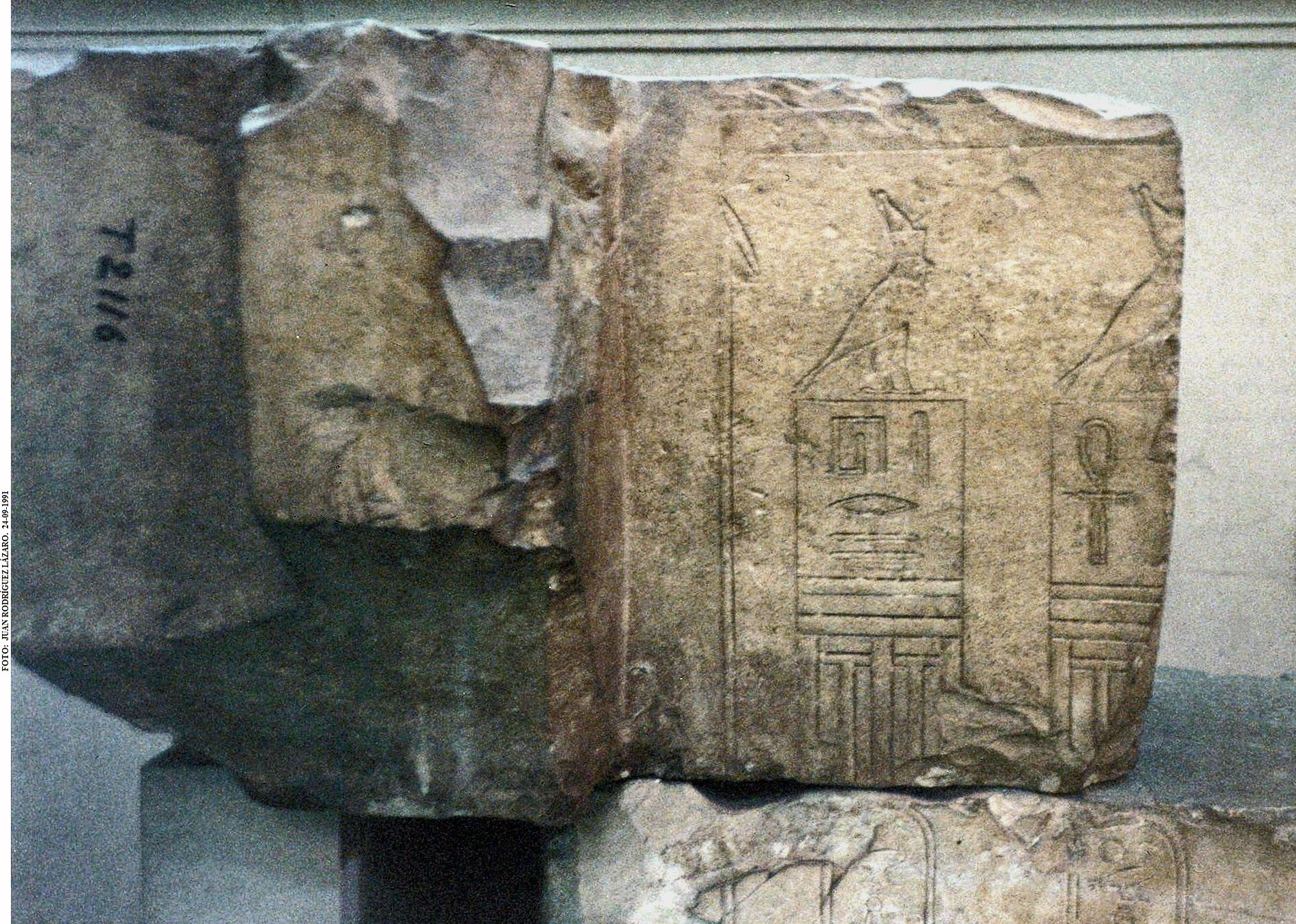
Stela of Intef I and Intef II, in the Temple of Montu at Tod, dated to the reign of Mentuhotep II. Now in the Egyptian Museum.

Wahankh Intef II (also Inyotef II and Antef II) was an Ancient Egyptian ruler from 2112 BC to 2063 BC, during the era now known as the First Intermediate Period. In the First Intermediate Period (c. 2181 – c. 2055 BC), rule of Egypt was decentralized and split between several dynasties based in different cities; Intef II's capital was Thebes. He expanded Theban authority into Lower Nubia, secured control over Upper Egypt, and established a central government. Intef II was the third ruler of the Eleventh Dynasty.

Intef II did not hold the pharaohonic titles used in the Old Kingdom. His titles did emphasize the divine nature of kingship. Intef II was buried in a saff tomb at El-Tarif.

== Family ==
Intef's parents were Mentuhotep I and Neferu I. His predecessor Intef I may have been his brother. Intef was succeeded by his son Intef III.

== Reign ==
After the death of the nomarch Ankhtifi, Intef was able to unite all the southern nomes down to the First Cataract. After this he clashed with his main rivals, the kings of Herakleopolis Magna for the possession of Abydos. The city changed hands several times, but Intef II was eventually victorious, extending his rule north to the thirteenth nome.

After these wars, more friendly relations were established and the rest of Intef's reign was peaceful. The discovery of a statue of Intef II, wrapped in a sed festival robe, in the sanctuary of Heqaib at Elephantine suggests that this king's authority extended to the region of the First Cataract and, perhaps, over part of Lower Nubia by his 30th year. This impression would appear to be confirmed by an expedition led by Djemi from Gebelein to the land of Wawat (i.e.: Nubia) during his reign. Consequently, when Intef II died, he left behind a strong government in Thebes which controlled the whole of Upper Egypt and maintained a border just south of Asyut.

The earliest attested dating of the god Amun at Karnak occurs during his reign. The surviving sections of the Turin Canon for the Middle Kingdom assign this king a reign of 49 years.

=== Titulary ===
Intef II apparently never held the full royal fivefold titulary of the Old Kingdom pharaohs. He did, however, claim the dual kingship nswt bity and the title s3-Re son of Ra, which emphasizes the divine nature of kingship. Upon accession to the Theban throne, Intef II added the Horus name Wahankh, enduring of life, to his birth name.

=== Officials ===
We know the name and activities of some of the officials who served under Intef II:

- Tjetjy was the chief treasurer and king’s chamberlain of Intef II and Intef III. His finely carved tomb stele, now at the British Museum, shows that Intef II claimed the dual throne of Egypt but also recognizes the limited extent of his rule: "The horus Wahankh, king of Upper and Lower Egypt, son of Re, Intef, born of Nefru, he who lives eternally like Re, [...] this land was under his rule southwards as far as Yebu and reaching as far north as Abydos". Tjetjy then describes his career in the typical self-laudatory manner of the Egyptian elite. Most importantly, the text demonstrates the undisputed power of the king in the Theban kingdom of the 11th Dynasty "I was a trustworthy favorite of my lord, an official great of heart and quiet of temper in the palace of his lord [...]. I am one who loved good and hated evil, one who was loved in the palace of his lord, one who performed every duty in obedience to the will of his lord. Indeed, as for every task which he commanded me to undertake [...], I performed it rightly and justly. Never did I disobey the orders he gave me; never did I substitute one thing for another [...]. Moreover, as for every responsibility of the royal palace which the majesty of my lord committed to me, and for which he caused me to perform some task, I did it for him in accordance with everything which his Ka desired."
- Djary was a military officer who fought the Herakleopolitan forces in the Abydene nome during Intef II's armies' northward push. His stele recounts the struggle for the control over Middle Egypt: "Intef fought the house of Khety to the north of Thinis".
- Hetepy was an official from Elkab who administered the three southernmost nomes of Intef II's realm. This means that there were no monarchs in Theban-controlled territories. Just as in the case of Tjetjy, the constant reference to the king in Hetepy's stele demonstrates the centralized organization of the government of the Theban kingdom and the power of the king, to whom everything was due: "I was one beloved of my Lord and praised by the lord of this land and his majesty truly made this servant happy. His majesty said: 'There is no one who [...] of (my) good command, but Hetepy!', and this servant did it exceedingly well, and his majesty praised this servant on account of it". Finally, Hetepy's stele mentions a famine that occurred during Intef II's reign.
- Idudju-iker was foremost one of the chiefs of Lower Nubia. He was in charge of Lower Nubia and helped the king conquering Abydos.

== Monuments ==
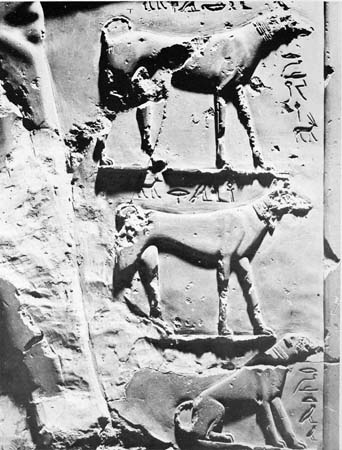
The dogs of Intef II on his funerary stele, Egyptian Museum, Cairo

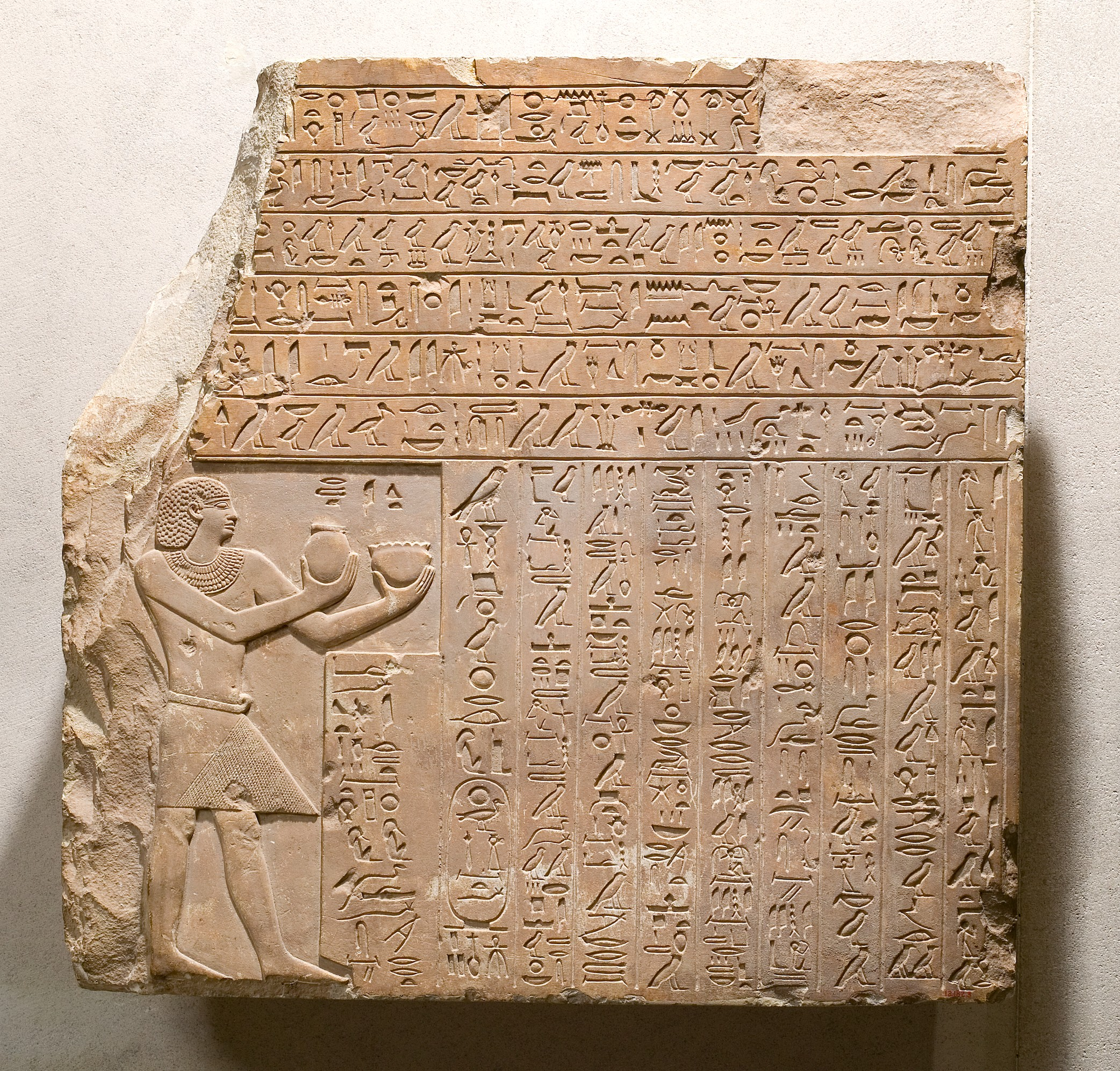
Funerary Stela of King Intef II in the Metropolitan Museum of Art

On his funerary stele Intef emphasizes his monument building activities. It is significant that the earliest surviving fragment of royal construction at Karnak is an octagonal column bearing Intef II's name. Intef II is also the first ruler to build chapels for Satet and Khnum on the island of Elephantine. In fact, Intef II started a tradition of royal building activities in the provincial temples of Upper Egypt which was to last throughout the Middle Kingdom.

=== Tomb ===
Intef's tomb in El-Tarif at Thebes is a saff tomb. Saff stands for "row" in Arabic and refers to the double row of columns and entry ways fronting a large 250 by 70 metres (820 ft × 230 ft) trapezoidal courtyard at the eastern end of which was a mortuary chapel. This chapel may have been intended to serve the same purpose as a valley temple.

Intef II's tomb was investigated by a royal commission during the reign of Ramses IX, toward the end of the 20th Dynasty, as many royal tombs were being plundered at the time. As reported on the Abbott Papyrus, The commission noted that: "The pyramid-tomb of king Si-Rêˁ In-ˁo (i.e. Intef II) which is north of the House of Amenḥotpe of the Forecourt and whose pyramid is crushed down upon it [...]. Examined this day; it was found intact." No remains of this pyramid have been found yet. Nowadays, the tomb lies beneath the constructions of a village.

Following the tradition of his nomarch ancestors, Intef II erected a biographical stele in the entrance of his tomb which relates the events of his reign and credits him with 50 years of reign. A stela mentioning the king's dogs was also said to be set up before the tomb. Another stela mentioning a dog named Beha was discovered, but it was found near the offering chapel.

Preceded by Intef I	Pharaoh of Egypt; Eleventh Dynasty	Succeeded by Intef III
