= Iah (queen) =

Queen of ancient Egypt (c. 2060 BC)

M17 D36 V28 N11
Jˁḥ
- Beloved King's Mother, Great Royal Wife
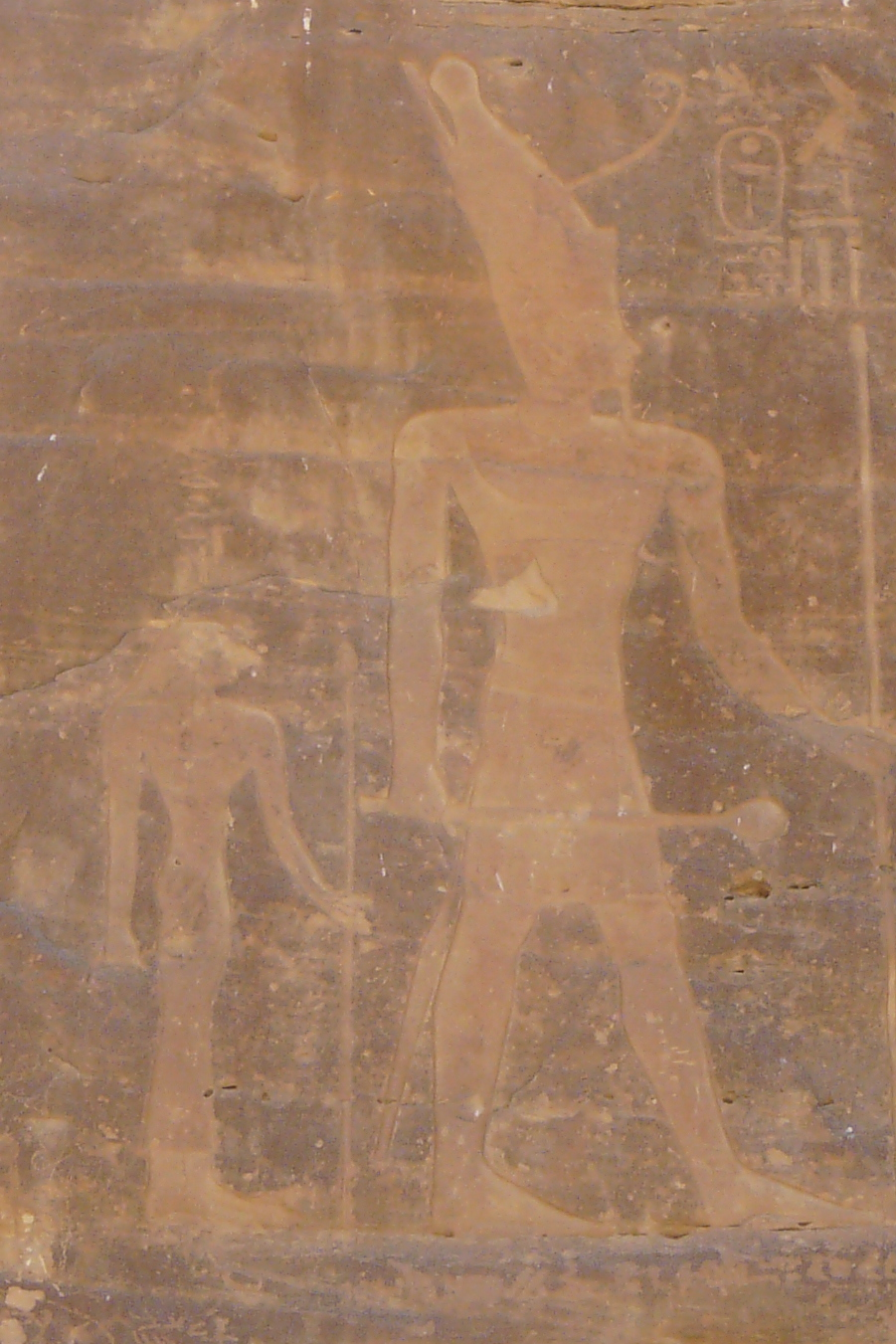
- Iah (left) and her son Mentuhotep II (right) at Shatt er-Rigal

Queen consort of South Egypt
- Tenure: c. 2060 BC
- King: Intef III
- Spouse: Intef III
- Issue: Mentuhotep II; Neferu II
- Dynasty: 11th Dynasty
- Religion: Ancient Egyptian religion

Iah (also Yah, Jah or Aah = "Moon"; fl. c. 2060 BC) was a king's mother and queen of ancient Egypt during the mid 11th Dynasty (2134–1991 BC). Daughter of a king, possibly Intef II, and mother of king Mentuhotep II, she was the queen consort of Intef III.

== Biography ==
Little is known for certain about the origin and life of Iah. She bore the title of king's daughter (Sȝt-nswt), which indicates that she was the daughter of a king, possibly Intef II, but this remains conjectural. Her name is a reference to Iah, an Egyptian Moon god.

Iah was married to king Intef III, although the important title king's wife is not attested for her. Their children were:

- Mentuhotep II (died c. 2009 BC)
- Neferu II

As the mother of Mentuhotep II and Neferu II, Iah was both the maternal and paternal grandmother of king Mentuhotep III.

Iah appears on a rock relief in the Shatt er-Rigal where she is shown standing behind Mentuhotep II. In front of both of them are depicted the beloved god's father, son of Ra, Intef and the royal sealer and treasurer Kheti. She also appears in the tomb TT319 of her daughter Neferu II. She is named on relief fragments of Neferu's tomb and on model coffins, where it is written: "Neferu, born of Iah".

== Titles ==
- Beloved King's Mother (mwt-nswt mryt-f)
- Priestess of Hathor (ḥmt-nṯr-ḥwt-ḥr)
- King's daughter (sȝt-nswt)
