= Intef III =

Pharaoh of Egypt

- Inyotef III, Antef III
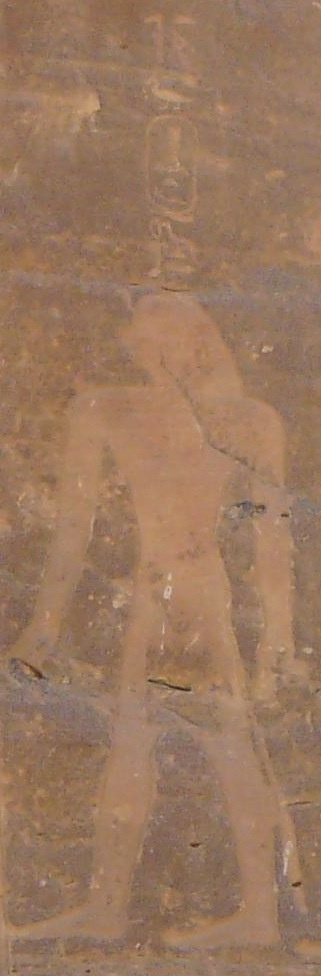
- Intef III on the Silsileh petroglyph

Pharaoh
- Reign: 8 regnal years 2069–2061 BC, 2068—2061BC, 2063–2055 BC, 2016–2009 BC
- Predecessor: Intef II
- Successor: Mentuhotep II
Royal titulary
Horus name
Nakhtnebtepnefer
Ḥr Nḫt-nb-tp-nfr
Horus, beautiful and strong champion
G5	N35 M3 X1 V30 D1 F35
Nomen
Intef
S3-Rˁ In-it.f
Son of Re Intef (litt. his father brought him)

G39 N5	W25 n&t&f
- Consorts: Iah, Henite
- Children: Mentuhotep II, Neferu II
- Father: Intef II
- Mother: Neferu-Khayet
- Burial: Saff tomb in El-Tarif known as Saff el-Baqar.
- Dynasty: 11th dynasty

Intef III was the third pharaoh of the Eleventh Dynasty of Egypt during the late First Intermediate Period in the 21st century BC, at a time when Egypt was divided in two kingdoms. The son of his predecessor Intef II and father of his successor Mentuhotep II, Intef III reigned for 8 years over Upper Egypt and extended his domain North against the 10th Dynasty state, perhaps as far north as the 17th nome. He undertook some building activity on Elephantine. Intef III is buried in a large saff tomb at El-Tarif known as Saff el-Barqa.

== Family ==
Intef III was the son of his predecessor Intef II. This is indicated by the stela of Tjeti, chief treasurer during the reigns of Intef II and Intef III. Tjeti's stele mentions the death of Intef II and goes on describing how Tjeti served Intef II's son who acceded to the throne upon the death of his father:

Then, when his son assumed his place, Horus, Nakht-neb-Tepnefer, King of Upper and Lower Egypt, Son of Re, Intef, fashioner of beauty, living like Re, forever, I followed him to all his good seats of pleasure.

Intef III possibly married his sister Iah, described as a king's mother (mwt-nswt), king's daughter (sȝt-nswt) and priestess of Hathor (ḥmt-nṯr-ḥwt-ḥr). This indicates that Intef III's successor, Mentuhotep II, was his son. This is further confirmed by the stele of Henenu (Cairo 36346), an official who served under Intef II, Intef III and his "son", which the stele identifies as Horus Sankhibtawy (s-ˁnḫ-[jb-tȝwy]), Mentuhotep II's first Horus name. Another piece of evidence for this parentage is a relief on the Gebel el-Silsileh in the Wadi Shatt er-Rigal, known as the Silsileh petroglyph, depicting Mentuhotep II surrounded by Iah and Intef III.

Additionally, Mentuhotep II's royal wife Neferu II bore the title of king's daughter, and an inscription in her tomb names her mother as Iah. This establishes that she was Intef III's daughter and the sister of Mentuhotep II.

== Reign ==
Intef III's father and predecessor reigned for 49 years and Intef III might thus have acceded to the throne a middle-aged or even elderly man. Although Intef III's name is lost in a lacuna of the Turin canon, a king list compiled in the early Ramesside period, its reign length is still readable on column 5, row 15, and given as 8 years.

The relative chronological position of Intef III as the successor of Intef II and predecessor of Mentuhotep II is secured by his established parentage to these two kings as well as the Turin canon and two blocks from the temple of Montu at Tod. These blocks show the succession of kings from Intef I to Mentuhotep II and while Intef III's horus name is damaged, its position is certain. The absolute dating of Intef III's reign is less certain and several dates have been proposed: 2069–2061 BC, 2063–2055 BC and 2016–2009 BC.

=== Military activities ===
Intef III inherited a large and relatively peaceful domain in Upper Egypt. Over his 8 years of reign, Intef was militarily active. He successfully defended the territory that his father Intef II had won, as is attested by the tomb of an official of the time, Nakhty, located at Abydos and in which a doorjamb bearing Intef III's names was discovered. He also conquered territories north of Abydos, in particular Asyut and extended his domain perhaps as far as the seventeenth nome of Upper Egypt thereby "imposing his family’s control over most of Upper Egypt". Alternatively, this might have been achieved by his son Mentuhotep II, early in his reign.

=== Building activities ===
A doorjamb bearing Intef III's name was uncovered on Elephantine in the sanctuary of Hekayeb, a deified nomarch of the 6th Dynasty, which shows that he must have ordered work there. Another doorjamb was discovered in the temple of Satet, also on Elephantine, which attests to building activity on the site.

== Tomb ==
Coordinates: 25°44′12″N 32°38′11″E

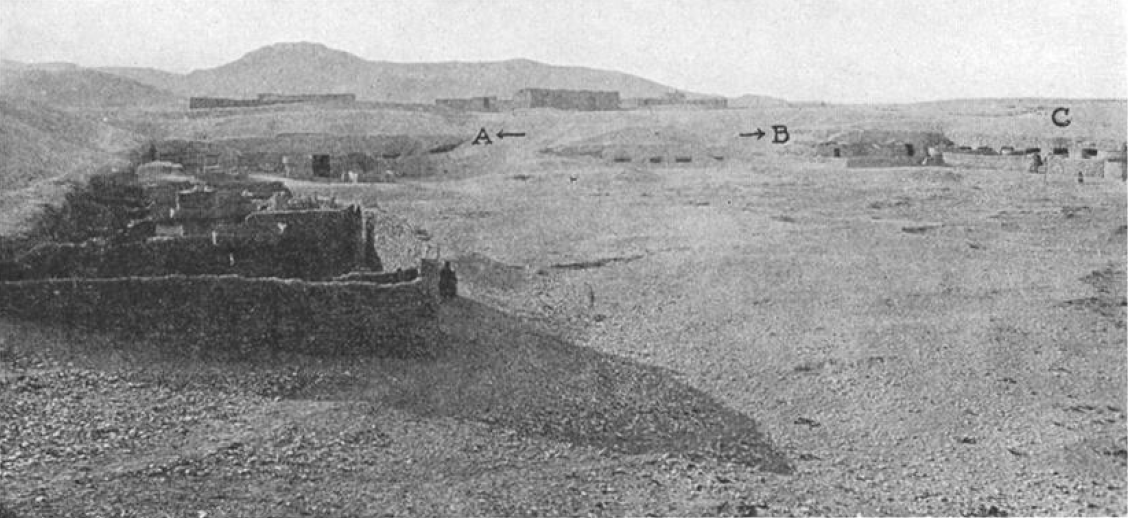
Herbert Winlock's 1915 photography of the tomb of Intef III. The tomb was tentatively attributed to Intef II by Winlock and reattributed to Intef III by Arnold.

The necropolis of the kings of the 11th Dynasty is located in El-Tarif, on the opposite bank of the Nile from Thebes. Several saff-tombs of imposing dimensions are found there but, until the excavations of the German Archaeological Institute under the direction of Dieter Arnold from 1970 until 1974, it was unclear to whom some of these tombs belonged.

Although no inscriptions could be found in the tombs (except that of Intef II) to confirm their ownership, their positions, together with the much later-attested chronological succession of the rulers of the 11th Dynasty, led to the attribution of the tomb known today as Saff el-Baqar to Intef III. The tomb resembles that of his predecessor Intef II and consists of a 75 m (246 ft) wide and 85–90 m (279–295 ft) long courtyard on a northwest - southeast axis facing a canal. The courtyard is surrounded, on all sides but the east, by many chambers dug into the rock. The courtyard leads to a large double-pillared facade totalling 48 columns behind which many more chambers are located.

In spite of the ruined state of the tomb, the 1970s excavations have shown that its walls must once have been lined with sandstone and adorned with decorations. Nowadays, the tomb lies beneath the constructions of a village.

Preceded by Intef II	Pharaoh of Egypt; Eleventh Dynasty	Succeeded by Mentuhotep II
