= Henuttawy =

V28 W10 t N17 N17 B1
Henuttawy
in hieroglyphs

Henuttawy (or Henttawy, Henuttaui) (ḥnw.t-t3.wỉ, “Mistress of the Two Lands [=Egypt]”, from ḥnw.t, 'mistress' and t3.wỉ, dual for t3, 'land') is the name of several royal ladies from Ancient Egypt.

- Henuttawy (19th dynasty), princess, daughter of Ramesses II (19th Dynasty)
- Henuttawy A, better known as Duathathor-Henuttawy, wife of Pinedjem I, mother of Psusennes I (20th − 21st Dynasty)
- Henuttawy B, princess and chantress of Amun, daughter of Pinedjem I (21st Dynasty)
- Henuttawy C, probably daughter of Menkheperre, sister-wife of Smendes II (21st Dynasty)
- Henuttawy D, God's Wife of Amun, possibly a daughter of Pinedjem II (21st Dynasty)
- Henuttawy E, priestess and chantress, died during the pontificate of Menkheperre (21st Dynasty)
- Henuttawy Q, today believed to be the same of Henuttawy A
- Henuttawy, priestess (21st Dynasty), mainly known for being one of the so-called "cocaine mummies"
- Henuttawy, Chantress of Amun, owner of tomb MMA 59
