= MMA 56 =

Ancient Egyptian tomb

Theban Tomb MMA 56
- Burial site of Ankhshepenwepet
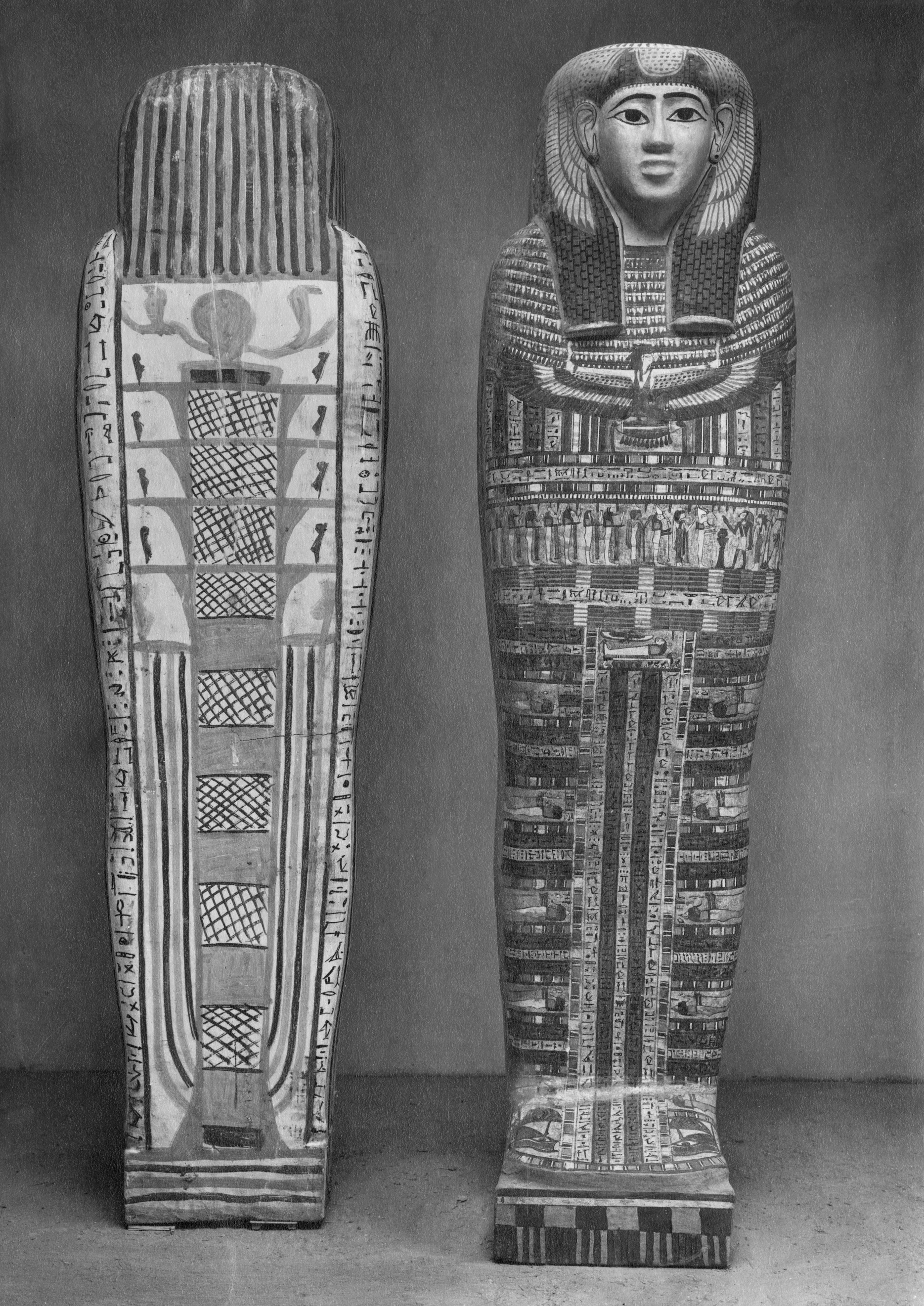
- Inner coffin of Ankhshepenwepet

- Location within Egypt
- Location: Deir el-Bahari
- Discovered: Twenty-fifth Dynasty of Egypt
- Excavated by: Discovered and excavated by Winlock during the 1923–24 season
- Decoration: none

The Theban Tomb known as MMA 56 is located in Deir el-Bahari. It forms part of the Theban Necropolis, situated on the west bank of the Nile opposite Luxor. The tomb is the burial place of the ancient Egyptian Lady Ankhshepenwepet, also called Neb(et)-imauemhat, who dates to the 25th Dynasty. Ankhshepenwepet was a Singer in the Residence of Amun and an attendant of Shepenwepet I. It was excavated by Herbert E. Winlock on behalf of the Metropolitan Museum of Arts in 1923–24.

The tomb was a pit burial. The body of Ankhshepenwepet had been removed but the tomb still held the coffin, a set of shabtis and the remains of a pet gazelle. Among the finds were a small statue of Ptah-Sokar-Osiris, an offering table and Ankhshepenwepet's dummy canopic jars.

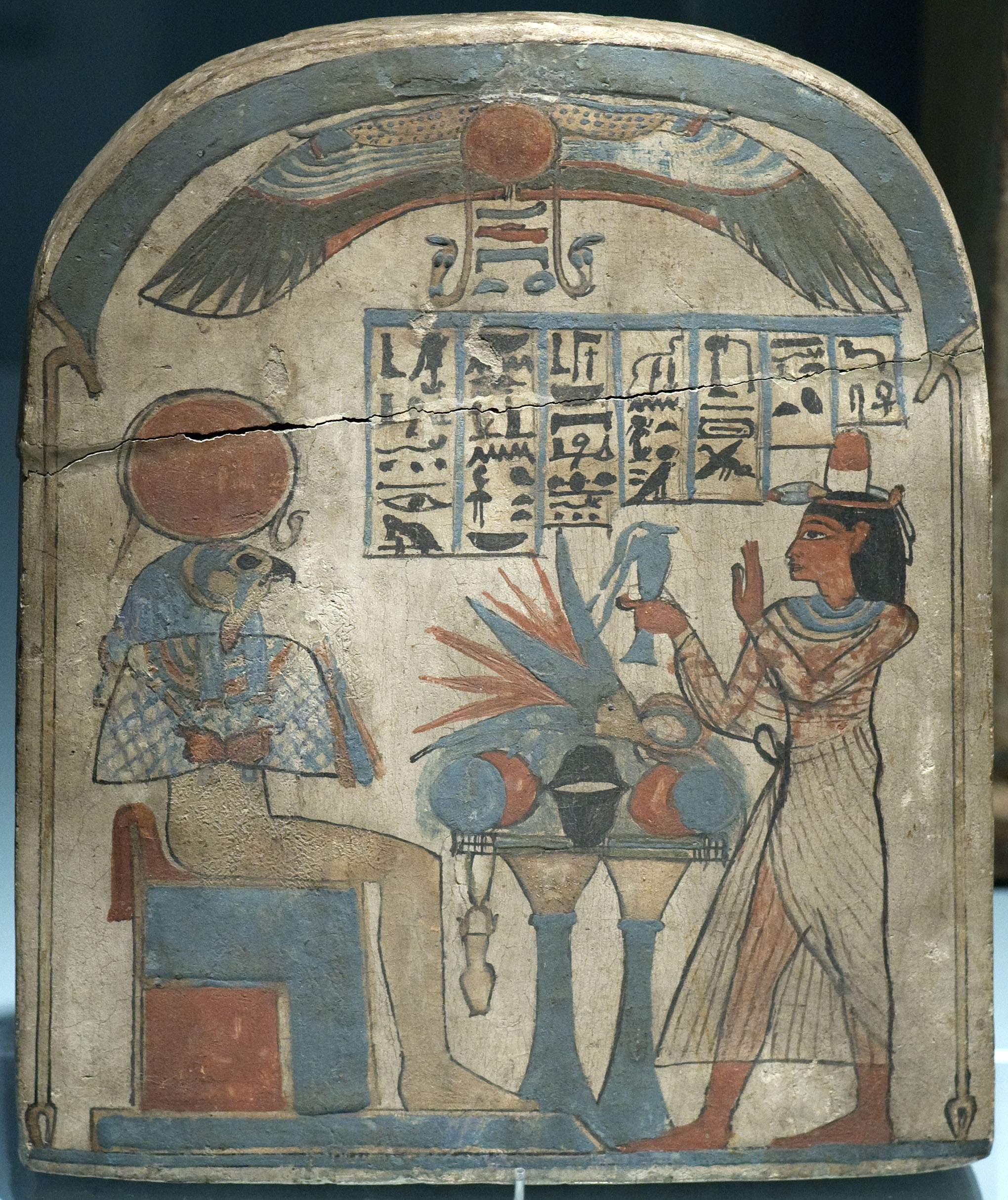
Offering table

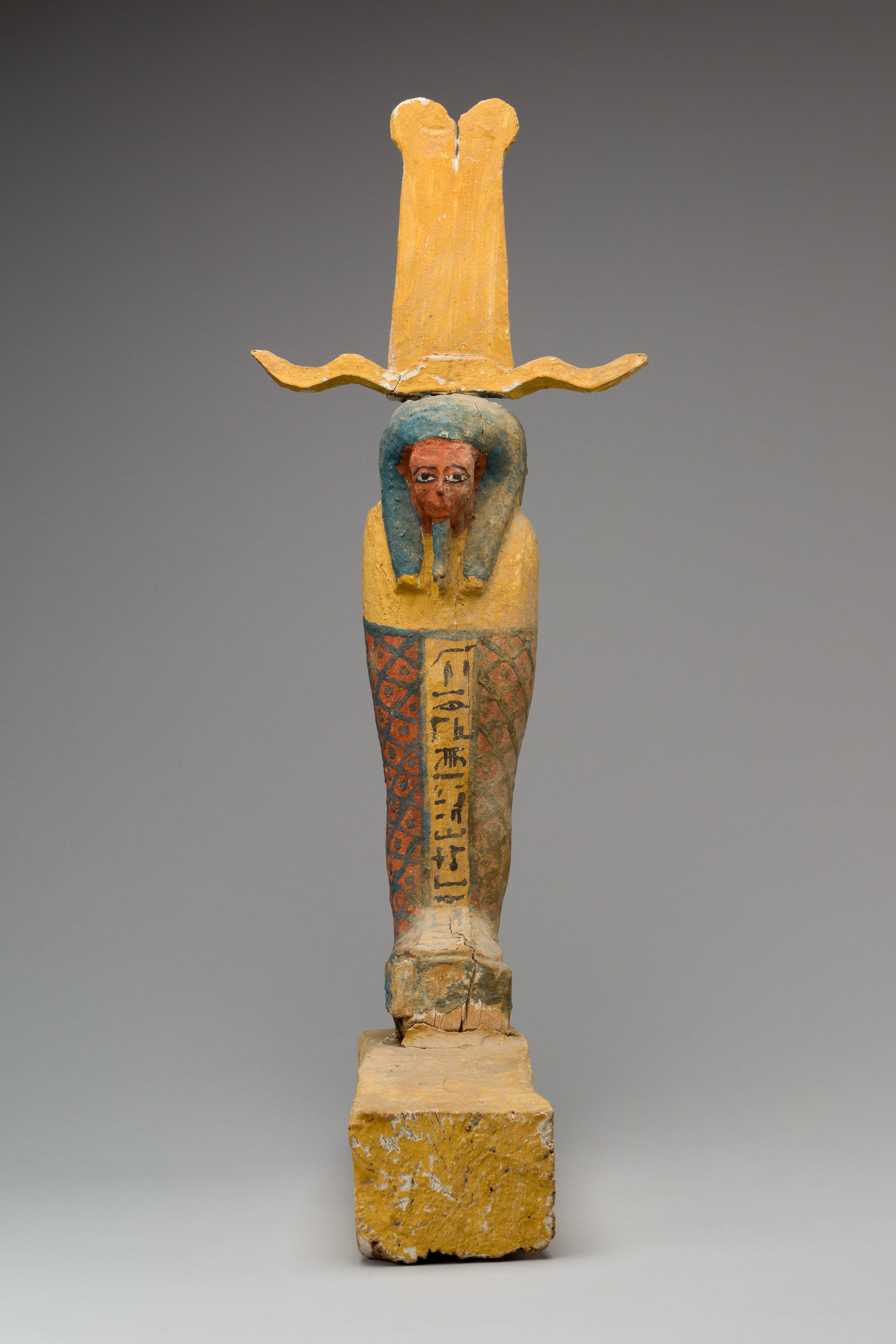
Ptah-Sokar-Osiris statue

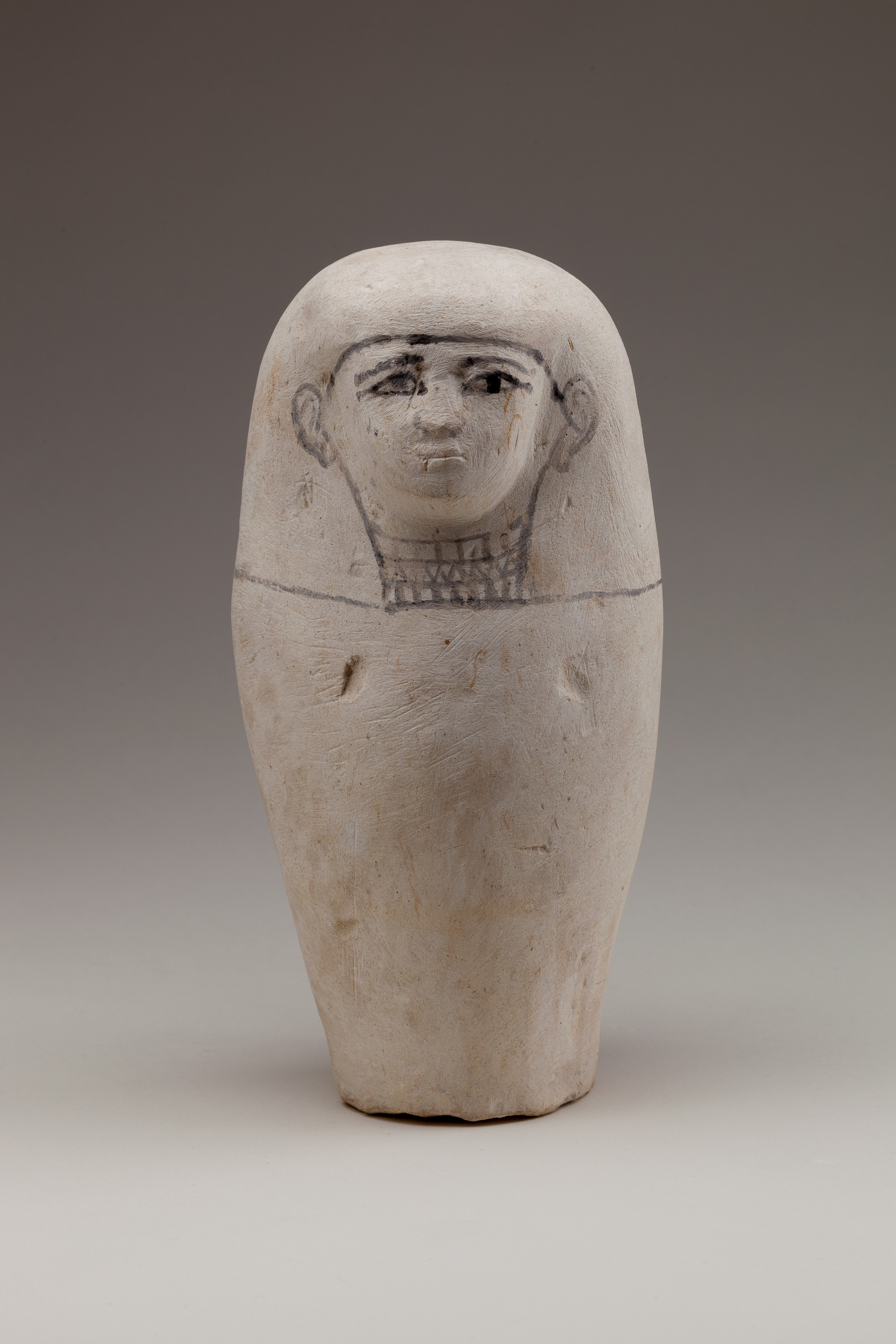
Dummy canopic jar with the head of Imsety

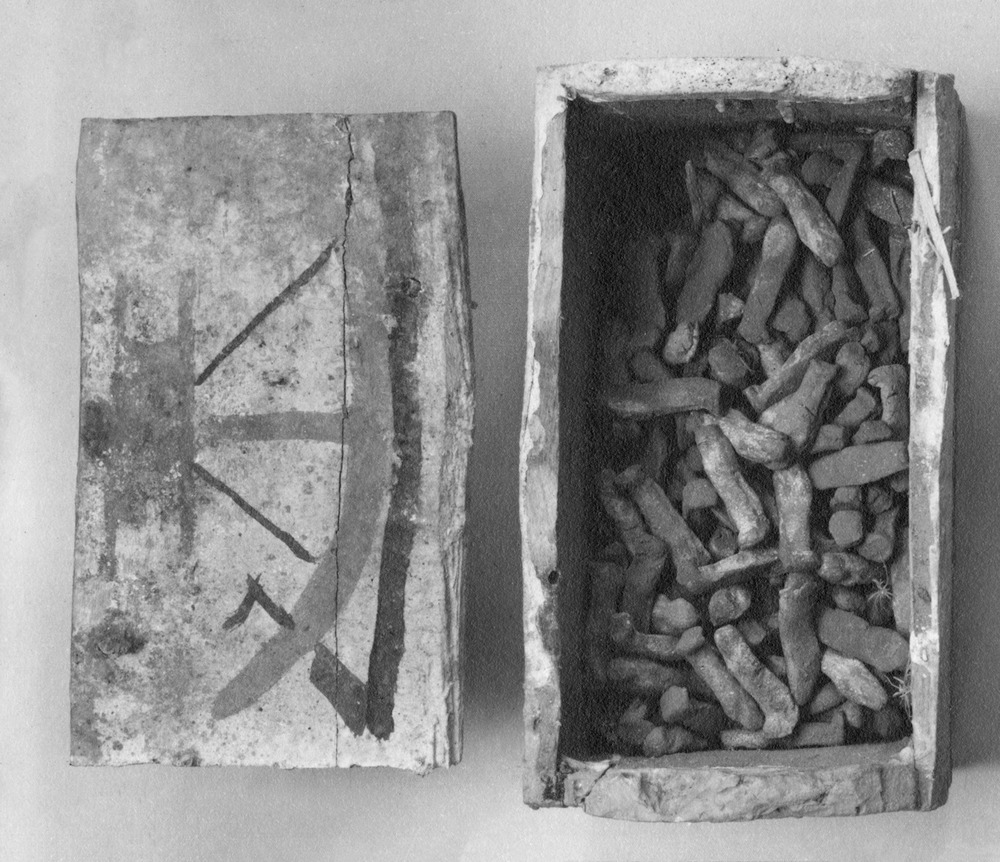
Shabtis

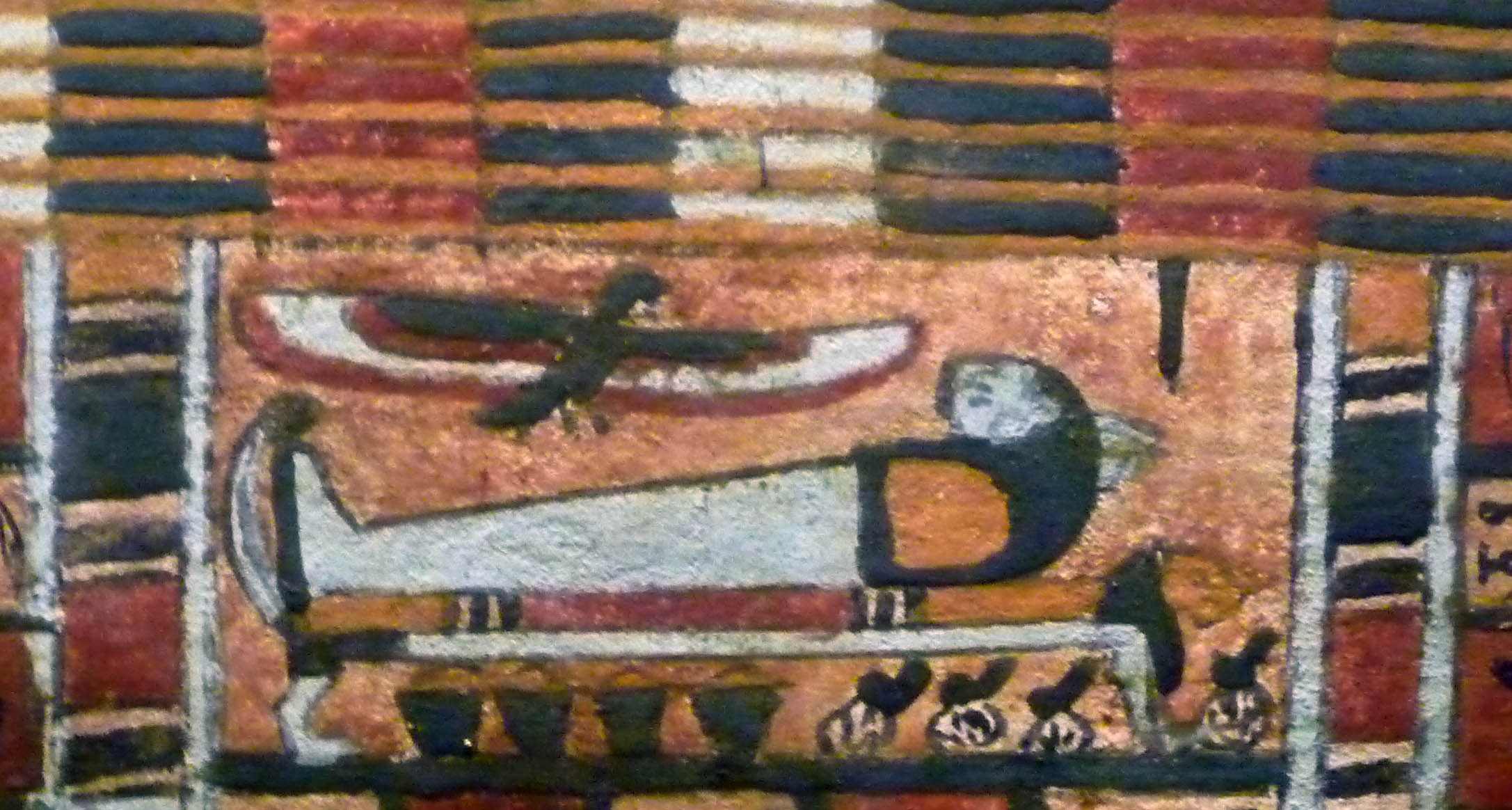
The inner coffin

anx n x S p Z9 wp t B1
Ankhshepenwepet
in hieroglyphs
Era: 3rd Intermediate Period
(1069–664 BC)

== See also ==
- List of MMA Tombs
