= MMA 57 =

Ancient Egyptian tomb

Theban Tomb MMA 57
- Burial site of Possibly Harwa, and containing Book of the Dead of Khaemhor
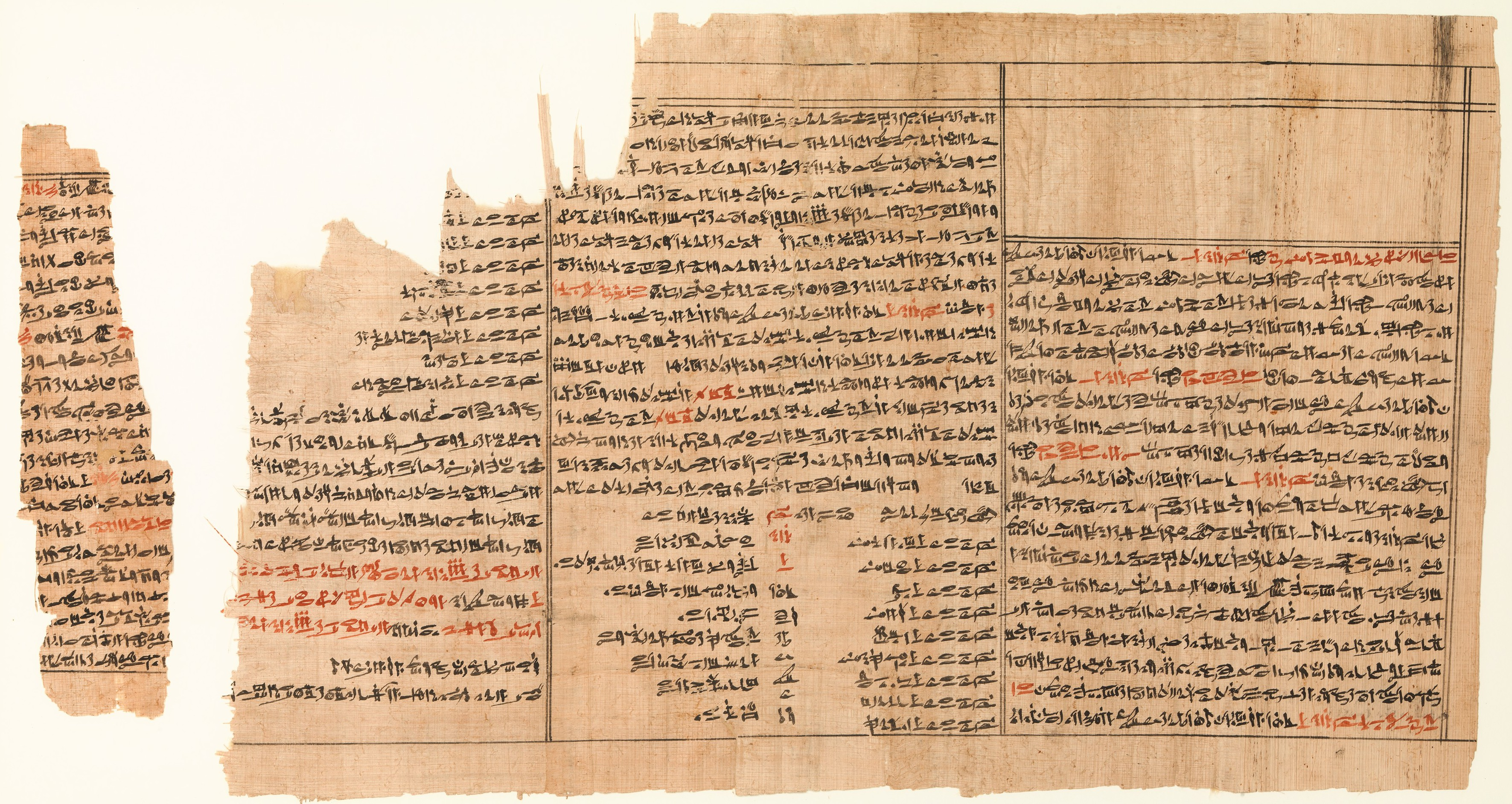
- Segment of the Book of the Dead of Khaemhor
- Location: Deir el-Bahari
- Discovered: Twenty-third Dynasty of Egypt and Twenty-sixth Dynasty of Egypt
- Excavated by: Winlock during the 1923-24 season
- Decoration: none

The Theban Tomb known as MMA 57 is located in Deir el-Bahari. It forms part of the Theban Necropolis, situated on the west bank of the Nile opposite Luxor. The tomb is likely the burial place of the Ancient Egyptian Harwa.

The tomb contained large sections of the Book of the Dead of Khamhor (also written as Khaemhor), who dates to the 26th Dynasty. Khamhor was a Prophet of Amon and Mayor of Thebes.

== See also ==
- List of MMA Tombs
