= MMA 507 =

Ancient Egyptian tomb

Theban Tomb MMA 507
- Burial site of Tomb of the slain soldiers
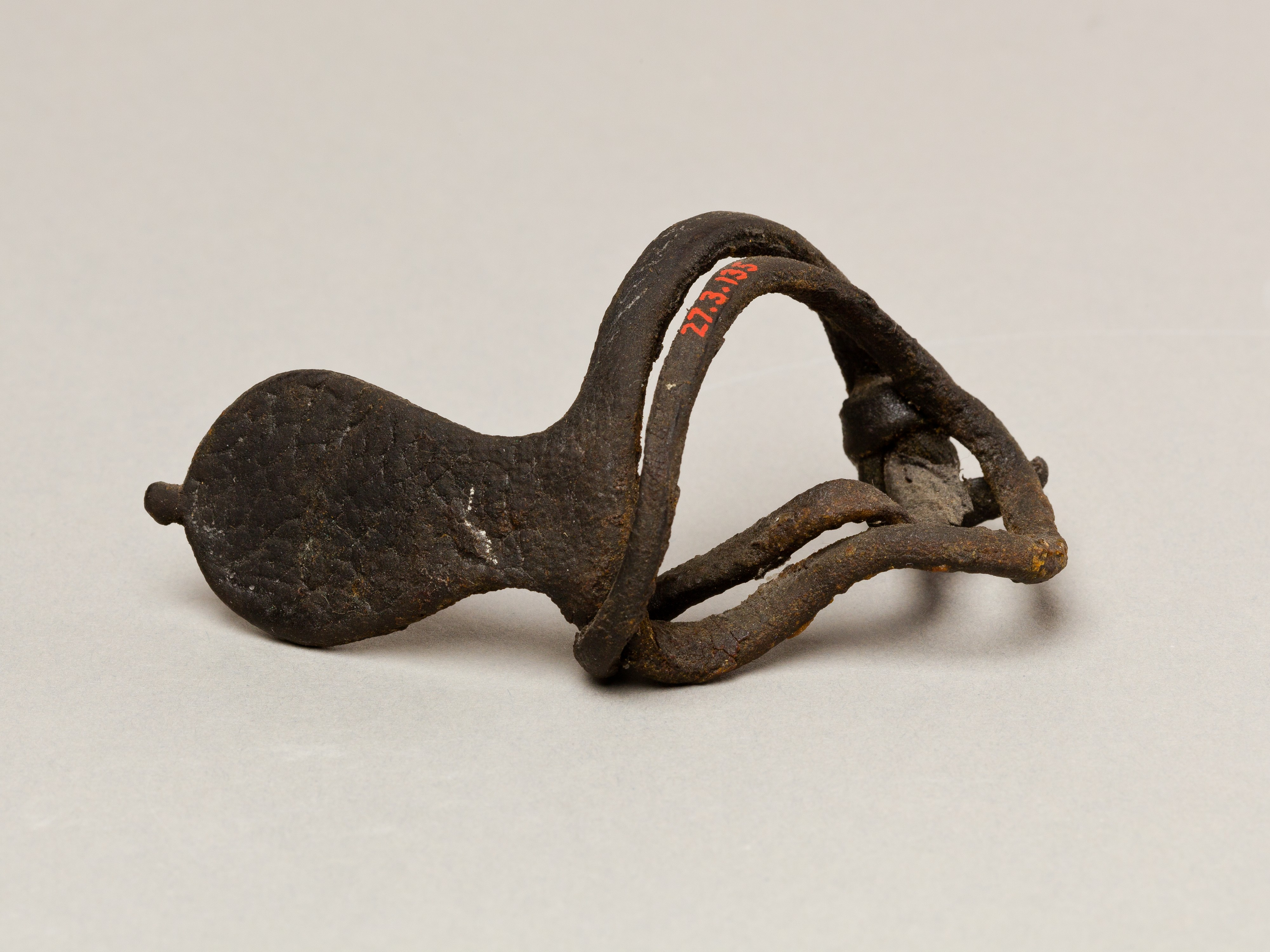
- Archer's wrist guard, now in the MET Museum

- Location within Egypt
- Location: Deir el-Bahari
- Discovered: Twelfth Dynasty of Egypt, likely from the time of Senusret I
- Excavated by: Discovered and excavated by Winlock during the 1926–27 season
- Decoration: none

The Theban Tomb known as MMA 507 is located in Deir el-Bahari. It forms part of the Theban Necropolis, situated on the west bank of the Nile opposite Luxor. The tomb is the burial place of approximately 60 slain soldiers dating to the 12th Dynasty.

The tomb was discovered by Herbert Eustis Winlock in 1923. It is located near the tomb of Kheti, the chancellor. The tomb had been robbed in antiquity and a pile of dismembered remains was found. The soldiers died from arrow wounds. Winlock commented that none of the bodies showed the trauma of hand-to-hand combat. Names of the soldiers included Ameny, Sobekhotep, Sebeknakht, Intef, Intefoker, Mentuhotep, and Senusret. Winlock dated the tomb to the 11th Dynasty from the reign of Mentuhotep II.

The date of the tomb was reassessed by Vogel. The current thinking is that the tomb dates to the 12th dynasty, likely from the time of Senusret I.

== See also ==
- List of MMA Tombs
