= Meru (overseer of sealers) =

- Overseer of sealers
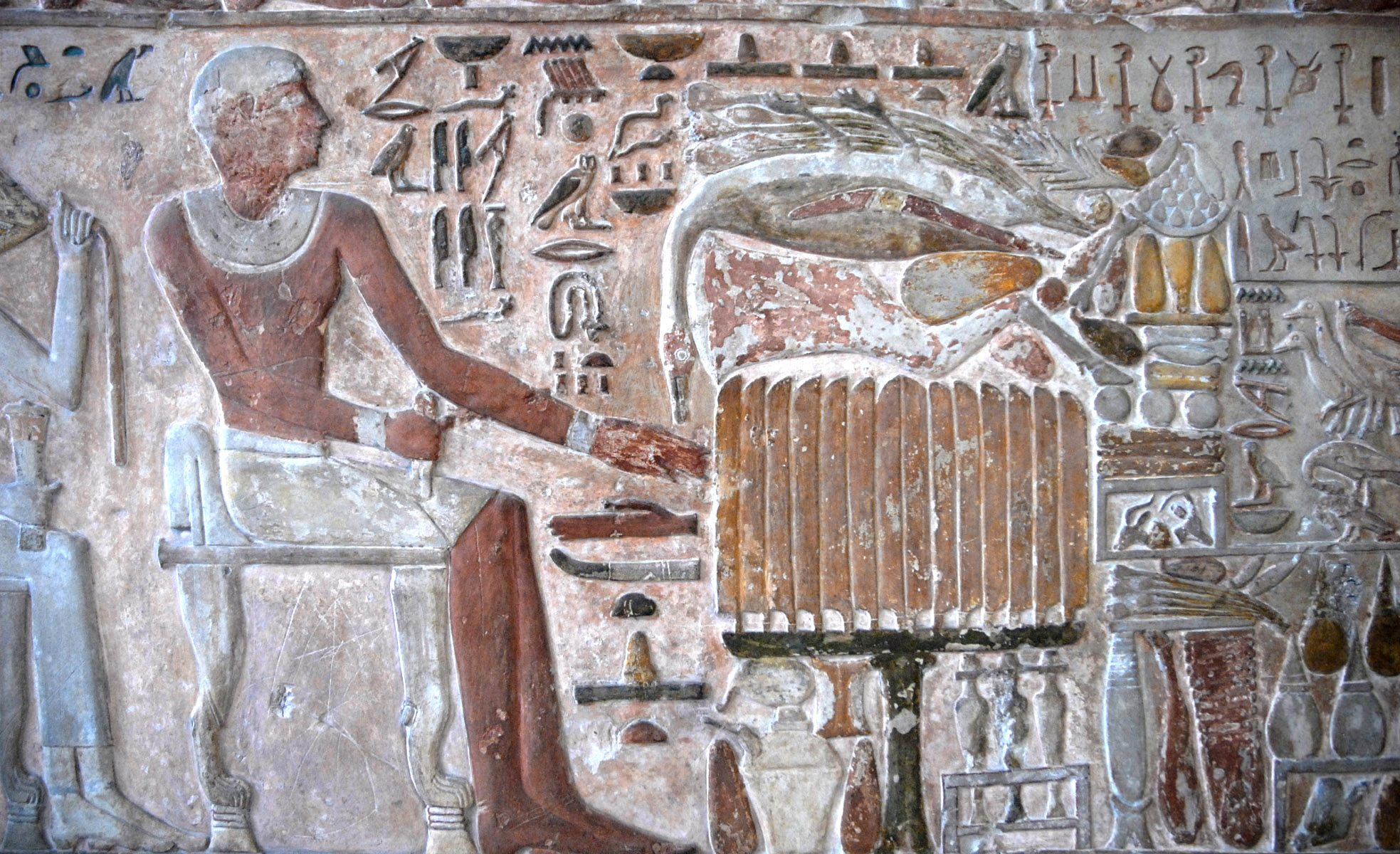
- Meru on his stela in Turin
Egyptian name
mr r w
- Tenure: c. 2025 BC
- Burial: TT240, Theban Necropolis, Egypt
- Father: Nebti
- Mother: Iku

Meru (fl. c. 2025 BC) was an Ancient Egyptian official under king Mentuhotep II in the 11th Dynasty. Meru was overseer of sealers at the royal court and therefore one of the highest state officials.

Stela of Meru, Museo Egizio, Turin

Meru is mainly known from his Theban Tomb (TT240). The tomb consists of the undecorated cult chapel and the underground burial chamber decorated with Pyramid Texts and Coffin Texts. There is a sarcophagus sunk into the floor decorated with friezes of objects and an offering list.

Meru is also known from a stela now in the Museo Egizio in Turin, Italy. Here his parents Iku and Nebti are mentioned. The stela is also dated under king Mentuhotep II. Meru appears finally in two rock inscriptions in the Shatt er-Rigal. Here he bears once the title overseer of the foreign lands.
