= List of MMA Tombs =

The list of MMA Tombs includes all tombs excavated by Herbert Eustis Winlock (1884–1950), an archeologist who worked for the Metropolitan Museum of Art. Some of the tombs also have a TT-designation, which refers to their provenience in the Theban Necropolis of Egypt.

== List of MMA Tombs ==
| MMA Designation | TT Designation | Owner(s) | Location | Period |
|---|---|---|---|---|
| MMA 31 | TT319 | Neferu II, Royal Wife | Deir el-Bahari | Montuhotep II, 11th Dynasty |
| MMA 56 | | Ankhshepenwepet | Deir el-Bahari | 25th Dynasty |
| MMA 57 | | Khamhor | Deir el-Bahari | 26th Dynasty |
| MMA 59 | | Hennutawy F, Chantress of Amun | Deir el-Bahari | 21st Dynasty |
| MMA 60 | | Djedmutesankh – Chief of the Harim of Amun; Henuttawy B – Daughter of Pinedjem I Henuttawy C – Chief of the Harim of Amun, Flutist of Mut, and God's Mother of Khonsu; Menkheperre C – God's Father, Priest of Amun-Re; Nesenaset – Chantress of Amun; Tiye – Chantress of Amun | Deir el-Bahari | 18th Dynasty, 21st Dynasty |
| MMA 65 | TT358 | Ahmose-Meritamun, Wife of Amenhotep I Nauny, King's Daughter of His Body, Singer of Amun | Deir el-Bahari | 18th Dynasty; 21st Dynasty |
| MMA 505 | TT310 | Nameless, possibly Meketre?, Chancellor of the King of Lower Egypt | Deir el-Bahari | 11th Dynasty |
| MMA 506 | | Anonymous | Deir el-Bahari | 12th Dynasty |
| MMA 507 | | Tomb of the slain soldiers | Deir el-Bahari | 12th Dynasty |
| MMA 508 | TT311 | Kheti, Treasurer of the King of Lower Egypt | Deir el-Bahari | 11th Dynasty |
| MMA 509 | TT312 | Nespakheshuty, Governor of town and Vizier | Deir el-Bahari | 26th Dynasty, time of Psamtik I |
| MMA 509a | | Unknown, perhaps Bebi, Vizier | Deir el-Bahari | 11th Dynasty |
| MMA 510 | TT313 | Henenu, Great steward | Deir el-Bahari | 11th Dynasty |
| MMA 511 | | Possibly Henu | Deir el-Bahari | 11th Dynasty |
| MMA 513 | TT314 | Harhotep, Seal-bearer of the King of Lower Egypt | Deir el-Bahari | 11th Dynasty |
| MMA 514 | | Multiple burials | Deir el-Bahari | 12th Dynasty |
| MMA 516 | TT315 | Ipi, Governor of the town and Vizier, Judge | Deir el-Bahari | 11th Dynasty |
| MMA 517 | TT240 | Meru, Overseer of sealers | El-Assasif | 11th Dynasty |
| MMA 518 | TT316 | Neferhotep, Head of the archers | Deir el-Bahari | 11th Dynasty |
| MMA 521 | | Statue of Iqer from this tomb | Deir el-Bahari | 11th Dynasty |
| MMA 729 | | Rennefer (Chamber A); Neferkhawet (chamber B); Baki (III) (East chamber); Amenemhat (East Chamber); Ruiu (IV) (East Chamber) | El-Assasif | 18th Dynasty Thutmosis I – Thutmosis III |
| MMA 801 | | Saiah, Wab Priest; Djedbastet Scribe of the House of the Divine votaress of Amun (Ta)Tiaset, Chantress of Amun; Nayefennbu, son of Saiah | Deir el-Bahari | 22nd Dynasty |
| MMA 807 | TT103 | Dagi, Governor of the town and Vizier | Sheikh Abd el-Qurna | 11th Dynasty |
| MMA 808 | | Sebeknakht | Sheikh Abd el-Qurna | 11th -18th Dynasty |
| MMA 812 | | | El-Assasif | 11th Dynasty |
| MMA 813 | | | El-Assasif | 11th -18th Dynasty |
| MMA 816 | | | El-Assasif | 11th Dynasty |
| MMA 817 | | | El-Assasif | 11th -18th Dynasty |
| MMA 818 | | | El-Assasif | 11th Dynasty |
| MMA 819 | | | El-Assasif | 11th -18th Dynasty |
| MMA 820 | TT366 | Djar, King's Guard of the Inner Palace | El-Assasif | 11th Dynasty |
| MMA 821 | | | El-Assasif | 11th -18th Dynasty |
| MMA 824 | | | El-Assasif | 11th -18th Dynasty |
| MMA 825 | | | El-Assasif | 21st -30th Dynasty |
| MMA 830 | | | El-Khokha | various |
| MMA 832 | | Aafenmut, and late period intrusive burial of Pakherkhonsu | El-Khokha | 22nd Dynasty |
| MMA 834 | | Wesi | El-Khokha | 18th Dynasty |
| MMA 839 | | | El-Assasif | 11th Dynasty |
| MMA 840 | | | El-Assasif | 12th -17th Dynasty |
| MMA 850 | | | Sheikh Abd el-Qurna | 11th Dynasty |
| MMA 1021 | | Amenemhat Q, King's Son | El-Assasif | 18th Dynasty |
| MMA 1101 | TT280 | Meketre | Sheikh Abd el-Qurna | 11th Dynasty |
| MMA 1102 | | Wah, estate manager of Meketre | Sheikh Abd el-Qurna | 11th Dynasty |
