= Tomb of Wah =

Ancient Egyptian tomb

MMA 1102
- Burial site of Wah
- Location within Egypt
- Coordinates: 25°44′07″N 32°36′15″E
- Location: Sheikh Abd el-Qurna
- Discovered: 1920
- Excavated by: Metropolitan Museum of Art
- Decoration: Undecorated
- Layout: Corridor

The tomb of Wah, also known by its tomb number MMA 1102, is an ancient Egyptian tomb at Sheikh Abd el-Qurna near Luxor, Egypt. Wah was the estate manager for the chancellor Meketre during the late Eleventh or early Twelfth Dynasties of the Middle Kingdom of Egypt. He died in his 30s and was buried in a small tomb cut at the entrance of his employer's large rock-cut tomb, TT280. In 1920 Wah's intact burial was discovered during the Metropolitan Museum of Art's re-clearance of TT280's causeway. Most of the contents of the tomb were awarded to the Metropolitan Museum of Art in New York. The mummy of Wah was unwrapped in 1940 after X-ray examination in the 1930s revealed his body wore many items of jewellery.

== Wah's life and career ==
V4 A H V29
Wah
in hieroglyphs
Era: Middle Kingdom
(2055–1650 BC)

Wah was an estate manager for the chancellor Meketre in the early Middle Kingdom of Egypt. He probably trained as a scribe from childhood, and later became the manager or overseer of the estate's storehouses. He bore the additional title "Overseer of Sealers". He died during the reigns of Mentuhotep II of the Eleventh Dynasty or Amenemhat I of the Twelfth Dynasty.

Examination of his mummy determined Wah was nearly 6 ft (183 cm) tall and about 30 years old at death. X-rays showed trauma and pathologies to his lower legs. He had Osgood-Schlatter disease in his right leg, a condition where the tendon pulls the bone away below the knee. He had healed breaks to the bones of his left foot, and both ankles showed bone spur formation. He seems to have been obese at the time of his death.

== Tomb ==
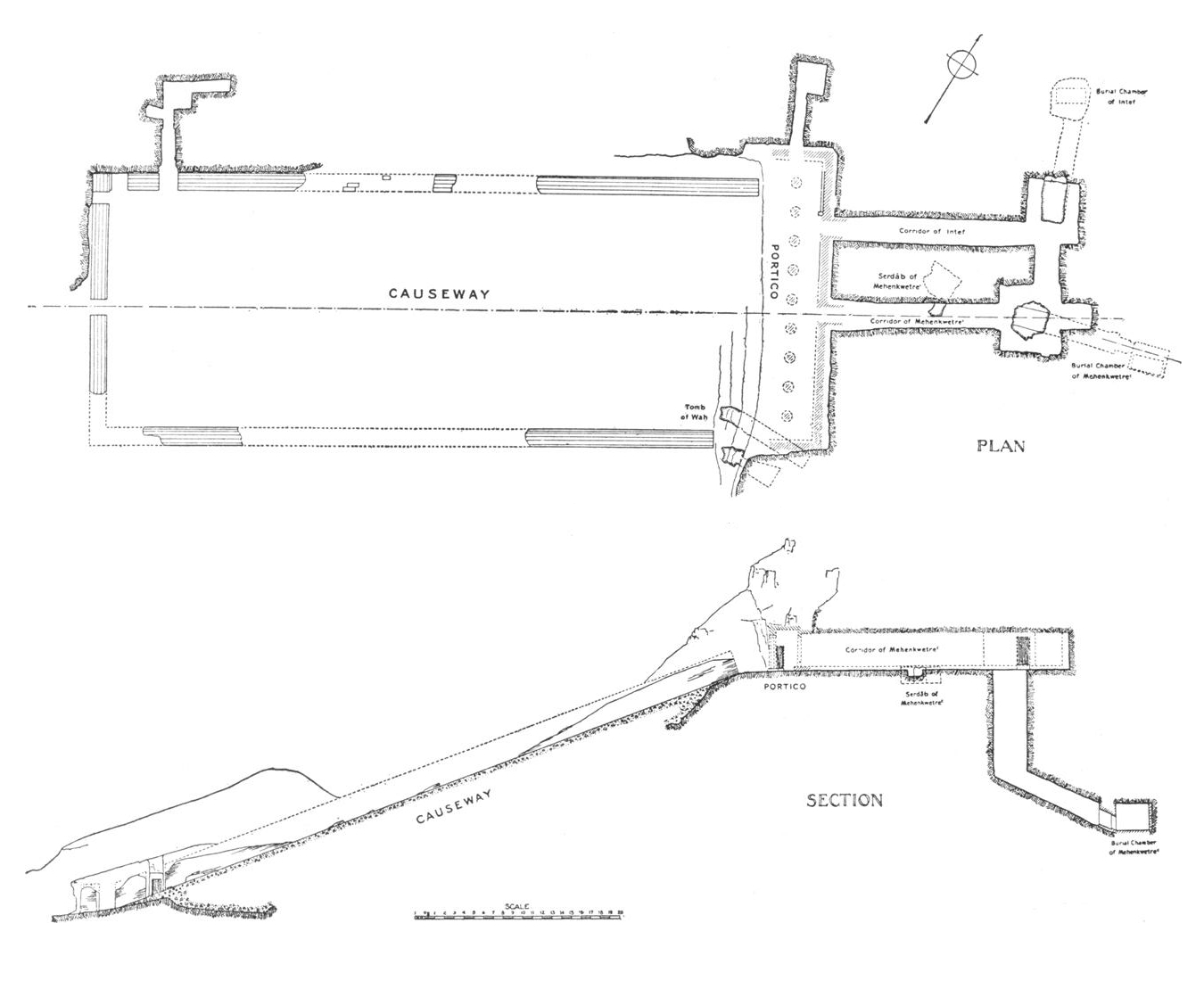
Plan of the tomb of Meketre, TT280. Wah's tomb is indicated at the bottom, on the right side of the ramp

Wah's tomb is adjacent to that of his employer, sitting high on the side of the valley behind Sheikh Abd el-Qurna, overlooking the mortuary temple of Amenemhat I on the west bank of the Nile opposite modern Luxor. It was cut at the top of the steep causeway (ramp) at the entrance of Meketre's tomb-chapel, TT280 (also known as MMA 1101). It was a simple rock-cut corridor 25 ft (7.6 m) long and 5 ft (1.5 m) wide and tall. After Wah's burial, the tomb's entrance was covered by fill used to build the causeway.

In 1920, the intact tomb of Wah was rediscovered during the Metropolitan Museum of Art's re-clearance of the causeway of TT280. It was assigned the tomb number MMA 1102. The entrance was closed with a blocking wall of mudbrick. His rectangular coffin, made of imported cedar, was placed at the far end of the space. The white pall of linen used to cover it during its transport to the tomb lay discarded at its foot; the three linen bands used to secure the pall around the coffin were left where they had fallen. Also left on the floor was the projecting knob of wood used to maneuver the coffin lid into place, which was sawn off by members of the funerary party after the lid was closed with pegs. Funerary offerings consisting of twelve loaves of bread, a foreleg of beef, and a stoppered jar of beer were placed beside the coffin, in front of the eye panel that allowed the deceased to "see" out.

When the coffin was opened, it was found to be filled to the top with over 30 sheets of folded fabric, the uppermost of which was smeared with resin. Three wooden staffs were placed among these upper layers. Below, the wrapped and masked mummy of Wah was placed on his left side, aligned with the eye panel. He faced east, with his head to the north. He lay on a folded sheet, with a headrest under his head and a small lump of rosin nearby. In front of his face was a copper mirror (which lacked a handle), and at his feet were a pair of wooden sandals and a wooden statuette wearing a fabric kilt. The majority of the burial goods were awarded to the Metropolitan Museum of Art; the Egyptian Museum in Cairo kept a selection of the fabric sheets and some of the bread.

== Mummy ==
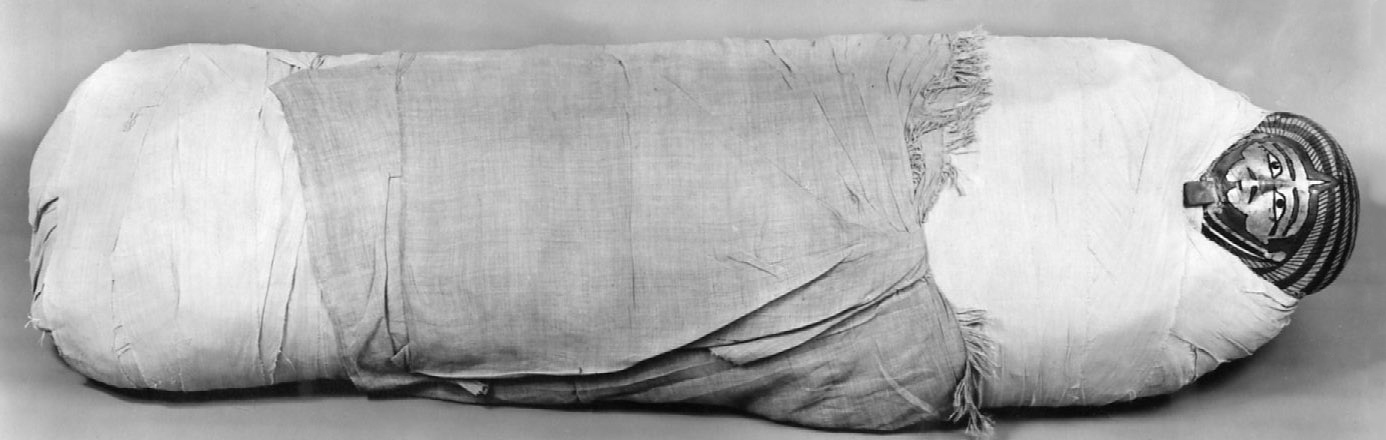
Wrapped mummy of the estate manager Wah

Wah's body was carefully mummified using a natron salt solution, typical of the early Middle Kingdom. His organs were removed through a cut in his abdomen; his diaphragm is intact, indicating his lungs and heart were left in place. His brain was also retained. However, no canopic jars, which were used to store the embalmed organs, were included in the tomb.

The mummy of Wah was wrapped in 375 m^{2} (448 sq yd) of linen, forming a large cylinder 60 in (150 cm) in circumference from which the face of his mask emerged. Fabric was expensive so this large quantity indicated Wah's relative wealth. It seems to have come from several sources. At least 60 sheets were marked with ink hieroglyphs identifying the quality and the owner; Wah's name occurred on 11 sheets. A fringed shawl, dyed red with hematite, was wrapped outermost like a kilt around his body. It bore an ink inscription which the Egyptologist Herbert Winlock read as "linen of the temple protecting Nyt-ankh-Sekhmet, justified". An alternative reading is "temple linen to protect"; red was a protective colour and associated with Osiris, god of the dead.

Wah's mummy was not immediately unwrapped because the mode of bandaging was said by Winlock to be "so clean and neat" that the Museum had "always hesitated to disturb him on the chance he wore anything of interest under his wrappings". In the 1930s, Wah was examined with X-rays which revealed many items of jewellery under his voluminous wrappings. In 1940, Wah was unwrapped. He was enveloped in layer upon layer of bandages up to 12 m (39 ft) long, large shrouds, and many pads made of folded sheets. At several intervals within the layers, the surface of the bandages was smeared with dark resin. It was found that several animals had been embedded in the resin layers. Outermost, in front of his knees was a mouse, found alongside resin swabs; in the innermost were a small lizard and a cricket.

=== Mask ===
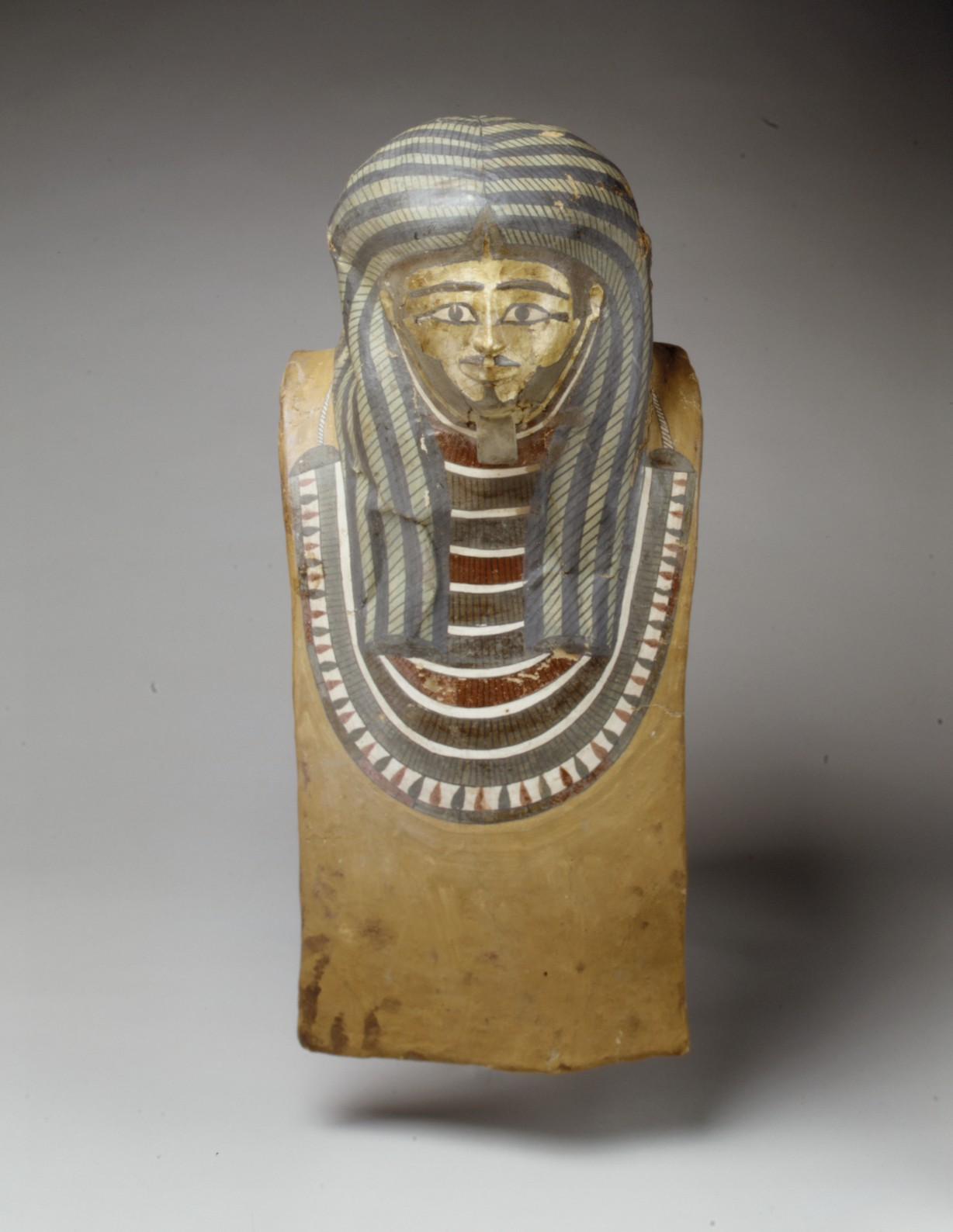
Funerary mask of Wah, Metropolitan Museum of Art

Around a third of the way through the wrapping process, Wah's head and chest was covered with a funerary mask that extended as far as his waist. It was made of layers of plaster and linen (cartonnage), with gilded and painted decoration. The face was gilded, with an attached short beard of wood; a small moustache and sideburns were added with paint. The eyes were painted and outlined as if in kohl. The head was covered with a striped wig or headcloth of blue and green. Around the neck was a painted broad collar executed in red, blue, and green in imitation of materials such as carnelian and faience.

=== Jewellery ===
Many amulets and items of jewellery were included in Wah's bandages. Innermost, across his chest was a broad collar of blue faience beads, and around his wrists and ankles were a total of eight bracelets and anklets of the same. The embalmers had put two on his left ankle and three on his right, leaving one for each wrist; the third they left on his body. Four scarabs, two of silver, one of faience, and one of lapis lazuli, were placed over his crossed arms; the largest scarab is inscribed with the names of Wah and Meketre. In higher bandage layers, four necklaces were placed around his neck. One was of hollow silver beads, one of smaller gold beads, one of carnelian, and the last of different types of stone. An oval bead of carnelian on a cord was placed in his left hand. Winlock identified the bead as a sweret-bead, usually placed at the throat; Seria Yamazaki suggests it be identified as the lesser-known ḏrtt-bead, intended to be placed in the hand.

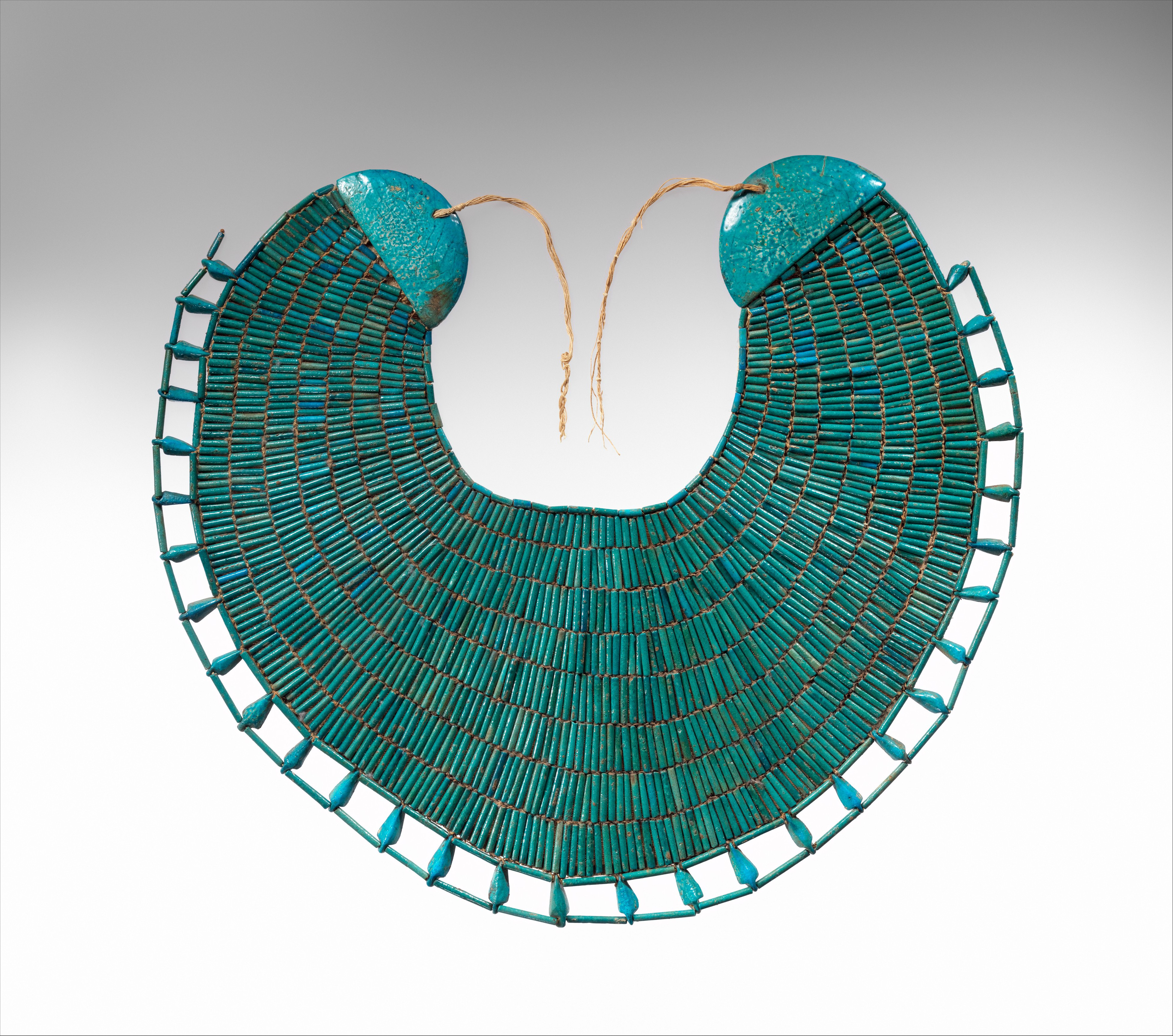
Broad collar of faience

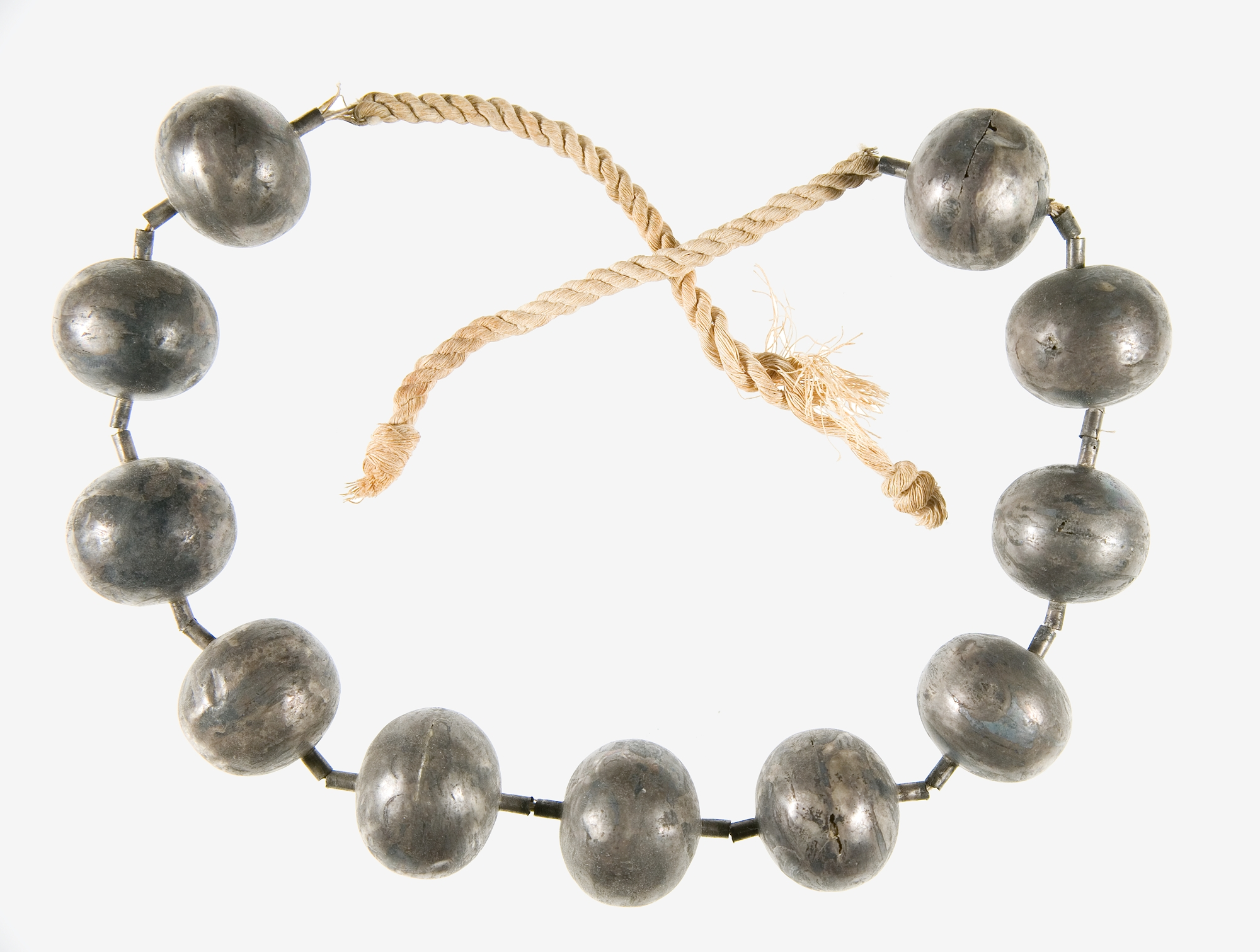
Necklace of silver ball-beads

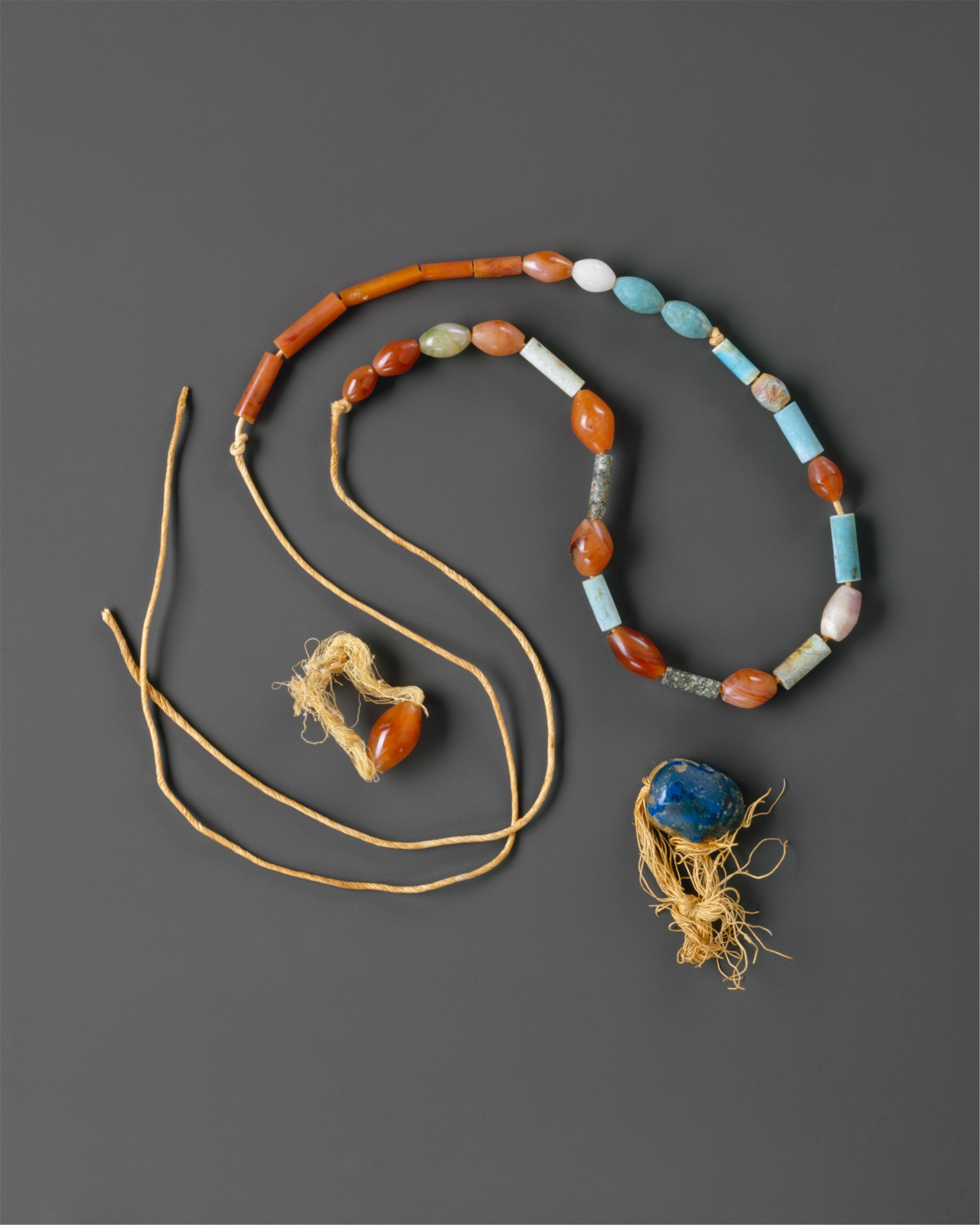
Multi-stone bead necklace, sweret or ḏrtt-bead, and lapis lazuli scarab.

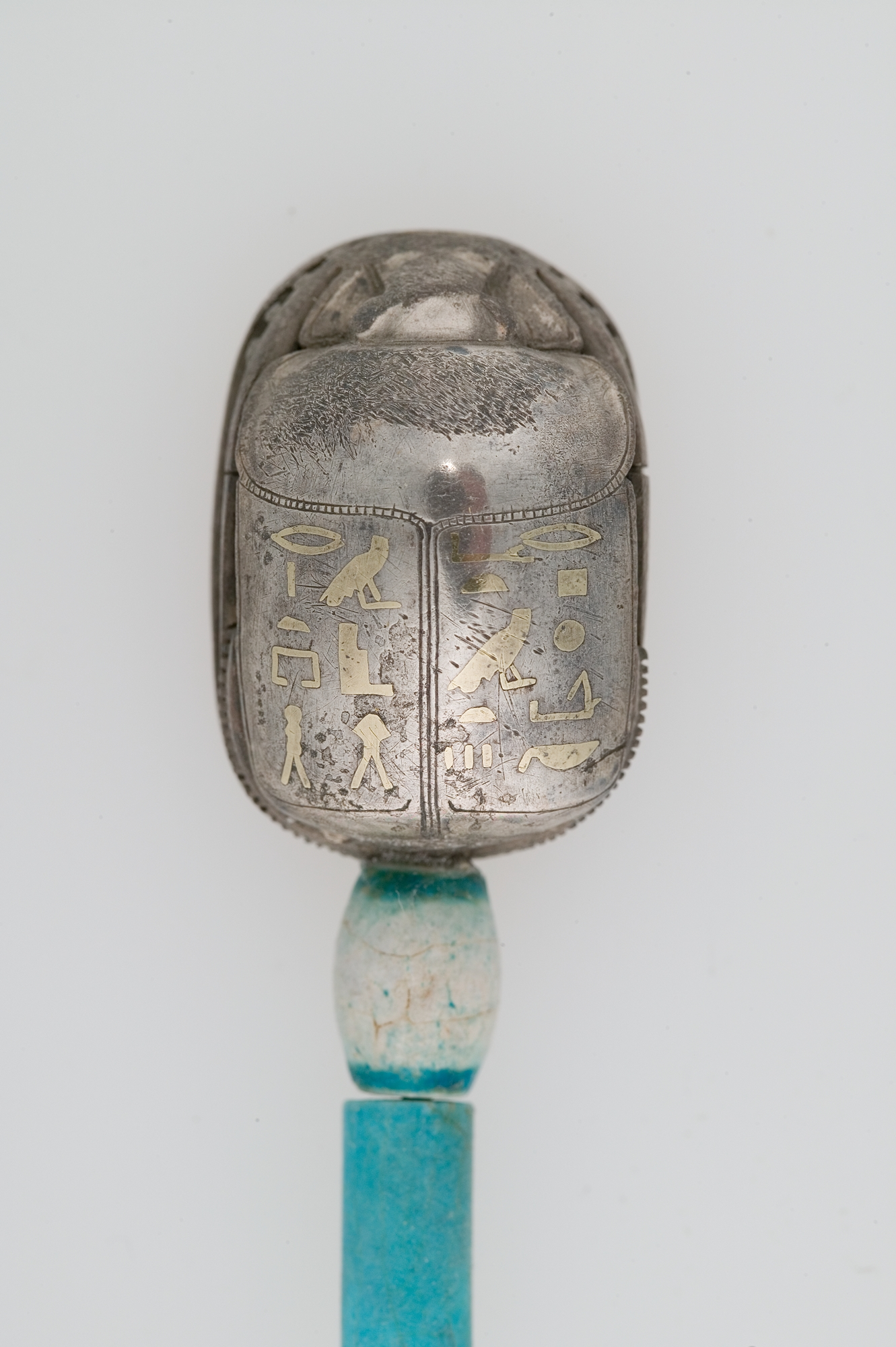
Inscribed scarab with the names and titles of Wah and Meketre
