= TT240 =

Theban tomb

Theban tomb TT240
- Burial site of Meru
- Location within Egypt
- Location: El-Assasif, Theban Necropolis
- ← Previous; TT239 Next → TT241

mr r w
Meru
in hieroglyphs
Era: Middle Kingdom
(2055–1650 BC)

The Theban Tomb of Meru TT240 (MMA 517) is located in El-Assasif, Theban Necropolis. It overlooks the mortuary temple of the 11th Dynasty Pharaoh Mentuhotep II (around 2000 BC).

Meru was the son of Iku and Nebti.

== Tomb ==
Stele of Meru, Museo Egizio, Turin

The tomb consists of a great courtyard at the hills of the El-Assasif. The tomb itself is cut into the rock and consisted of a corridor and a second corridor which goes down to the burial chamber. The first corridor was found undecorated, while the burial chamber is fully decorated with religious texts, several false doors, the depiction of an offering table and an offering list. The sarcophagus of Meru was cut into the ground of the burial chamber and also decorated on its inside.

Meru was a high official under Mentuhotep II with the titles royal sealer and overseer of sealers. He is also known from a big stele now in Turin. The stele is dated to year 46 of the king. Its provenance is not known, but comes perhaps from this tomb.

== See also ==
- List of Theban tombs
- List of MMA Tombs
