= MMA 729 =

Theban tomb of Neferkhawet and his family

MMA729
- Burial site of Neferkhawet and relatives
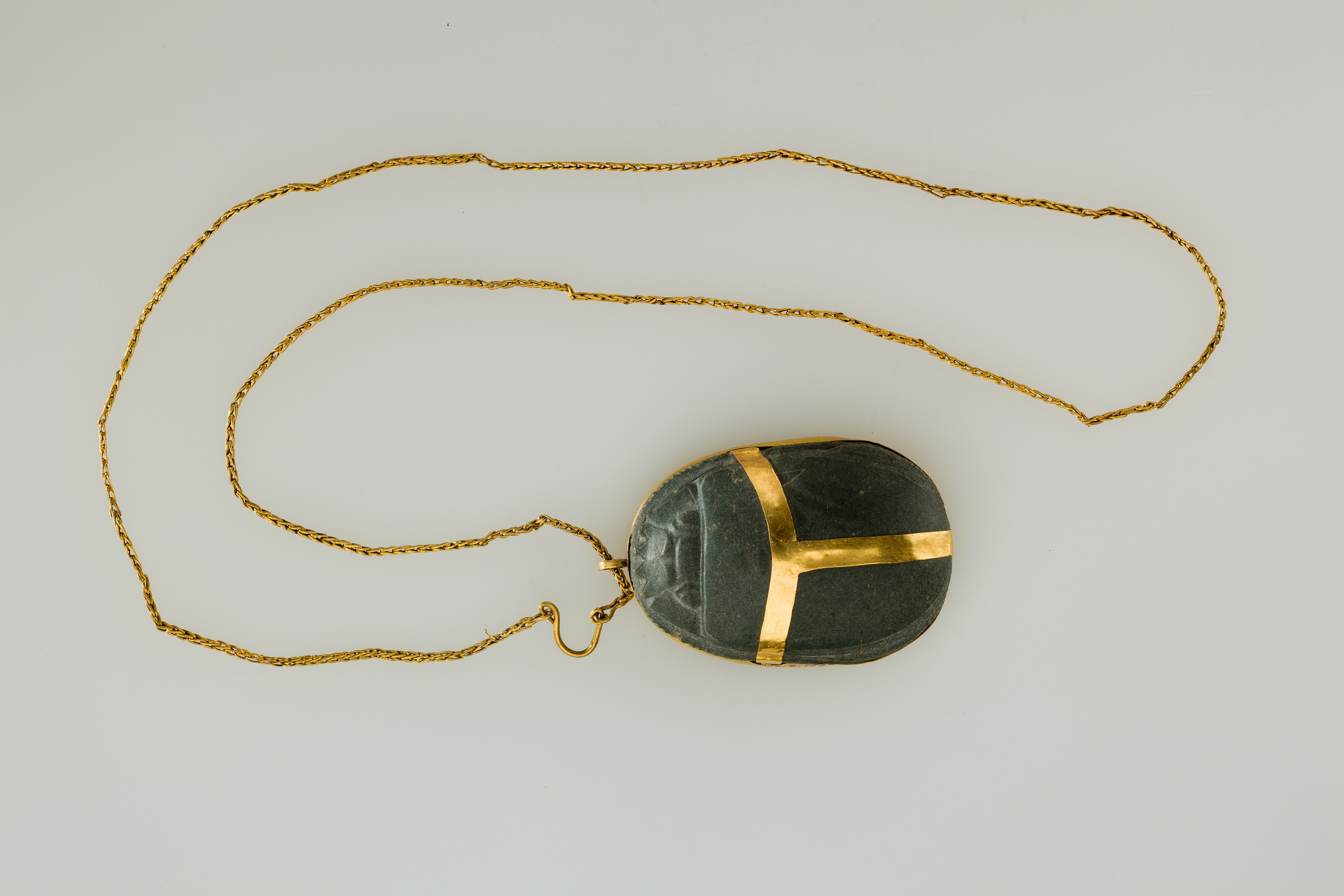
- Heart Scarab of Neferkhawet

- Location within Egypt
- Location: El-Assasif

Tomb MMA729 is located in El-Assasif, in the Theban Necropolis near Luxor, Egypt. It contained the burials of Neferkhawet, his wife Rennefer, his son Amunemhet, his daughter Ruiu, and his son or son-in-law Bakamun called Baki. Neferkhawet was a scribe and keeper of the documents during the Thutmosid period.

== Neferkhawet and Rennefer ==
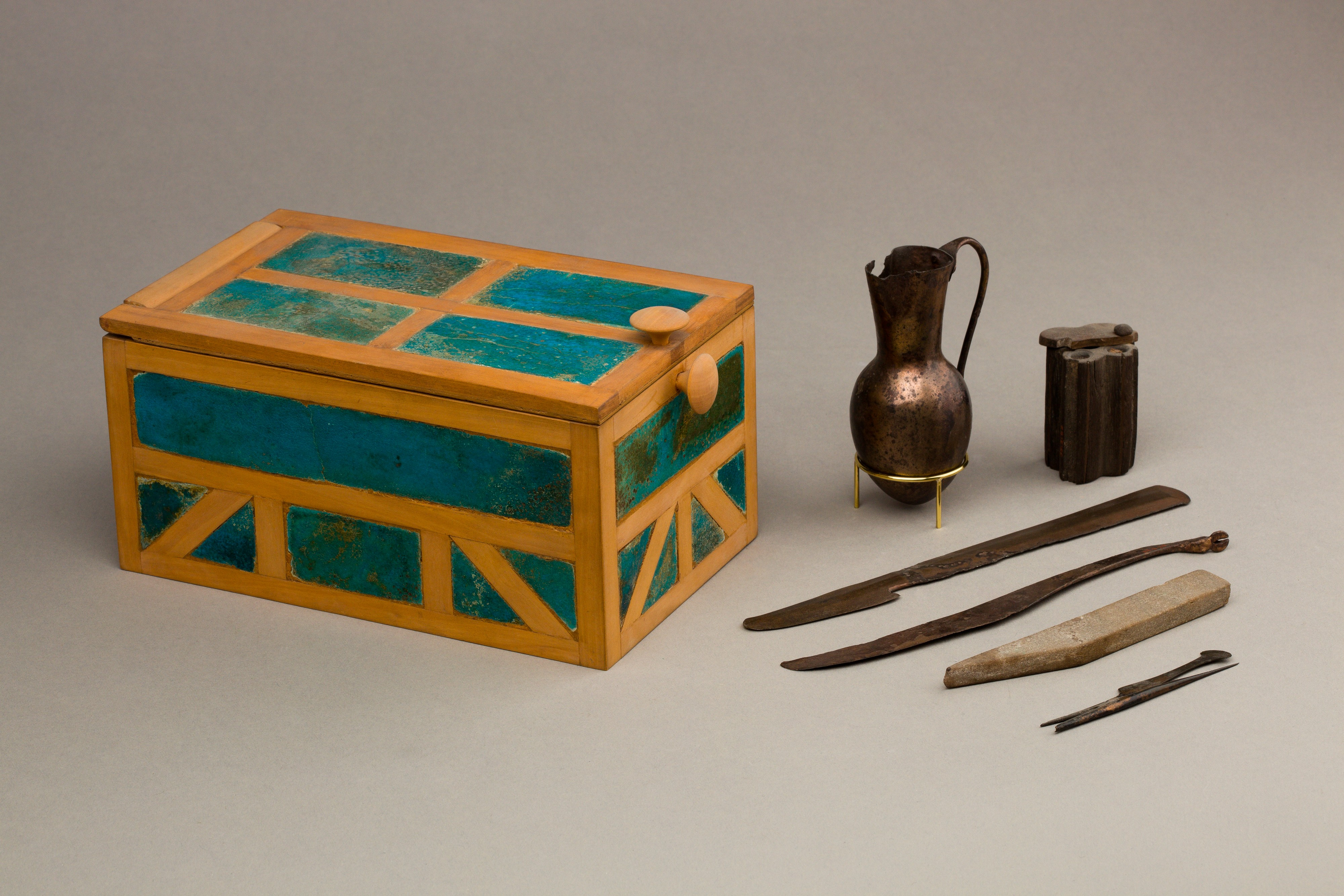
Jewelry box, small pitcher, kohl tube and razors from the tomb.

Neferkhawet and his wife were buried in the Western chambers of the tomb. Neferkhawet served as a chief scribe to Hatshepsut when she was still a princess. He later became the treasurer and keeper of the documents in the House of the God's Wife Hatshepsut. his wife Rennefer was a Lady of the House. The bodies had been mummified in a simple fashion. The internal organs had not been removed, but the bodies were treated with natron. The burial equipment did include canopic jars, which were empty.

== Amenemhet, Ruiu and Baki ==
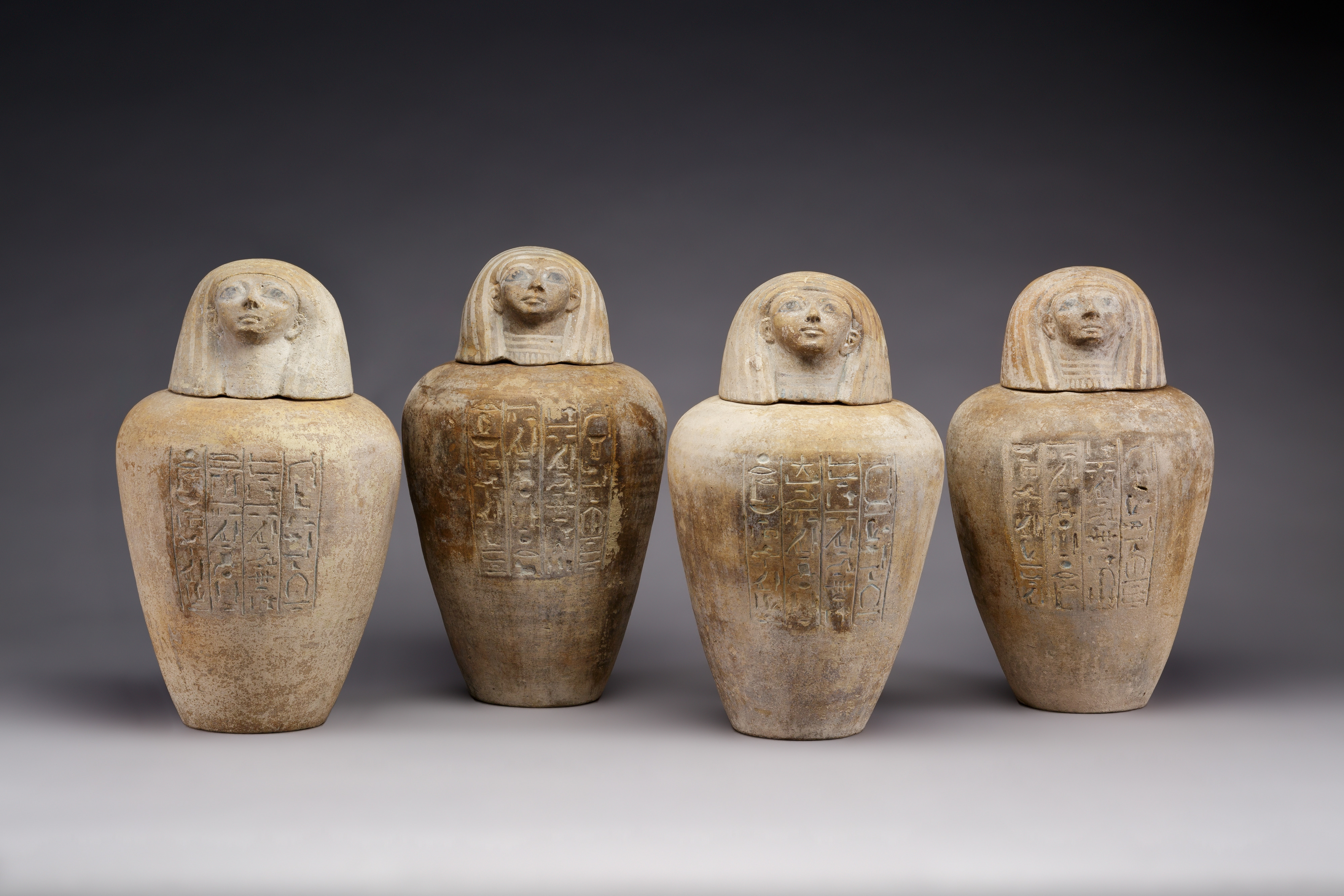
The canopic jars of Ruiu

The son Amenemhet, daughter Ruiu and son or son-in-law Baki were buried in the Eastern chamber of the tomb. As with the older generation, these bodies were mummified by simply immersing them in natron. The internal organs were left in the bodies and the canopic jars in the tomb were empty.

== Additional burials ==
Next to Amenemhet, Ruiu and Baki the excavators found five more burials. The additional bodies appear to be of either poor relations or servants of the family. The bodies do not show signs of deliberate mummification. Hayes refers to the individuals by Roman numerals:

- Burial VI – infant girl 12–15 months old, buried in anthropoid coffin
- Burial VII – six-year-old boy, buried in a rectangular wooden coffin
- Burial VIII – adult woman, buried in a rectangular wooden coffin. The coffin originally belonged to a scribe named Neferkhawet.
- Burial IX – an infant aged less than 6 months buried in anthropoid coffin
- Burial X – boy 9–10 years old, buried in a rectangular wooden coffin

== See also ==
- List of MMA Tombs
