= Usekh collar =

Ancient Egyptian neck ornament

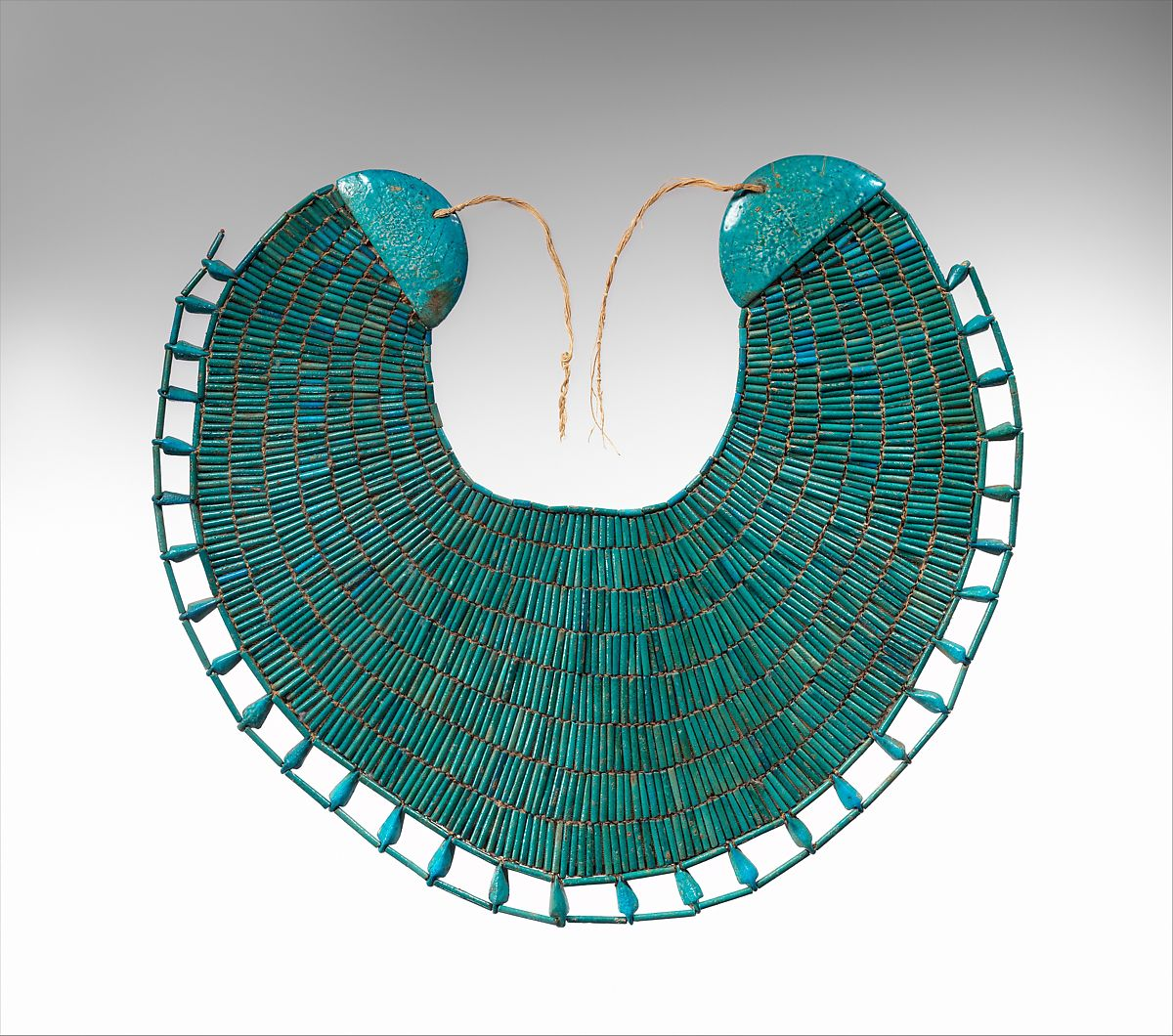
Broad Collar of Wah, 1981–1975 BC; faience, linen thread; Metropolitan Museum of Art

The usekh or wesekh was a type of broad collar necklace used in ancient Egypt. It was composed of tubular and/or teardrop-shaped beads arranged in curved rows, often fitted with terminals and sometimes a counterweight. The usekh is depicted as being worn by deities as well as by both women and men from as early as the Old Kingdom (c. 2670–2195 BC).

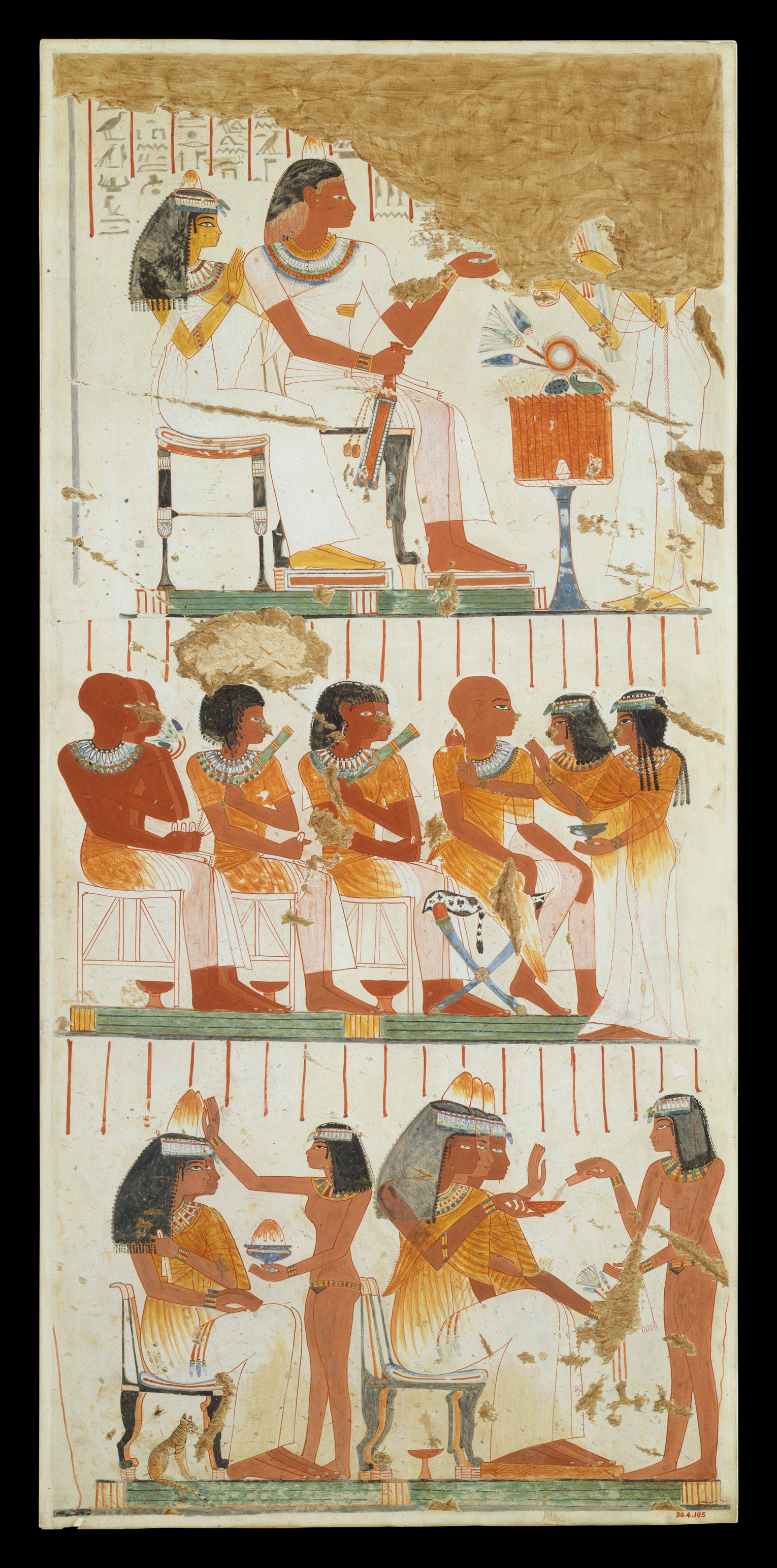
Guests at a banquet wearing usekh collars; Tomb of Nebamun and Ipuky (TT181)

== Etymology ==
The ancient Egyptian word wsḫ can mean "breadth" or "width", and the ornament is therefore commonly referred to as a broad collar.

== Construction ==
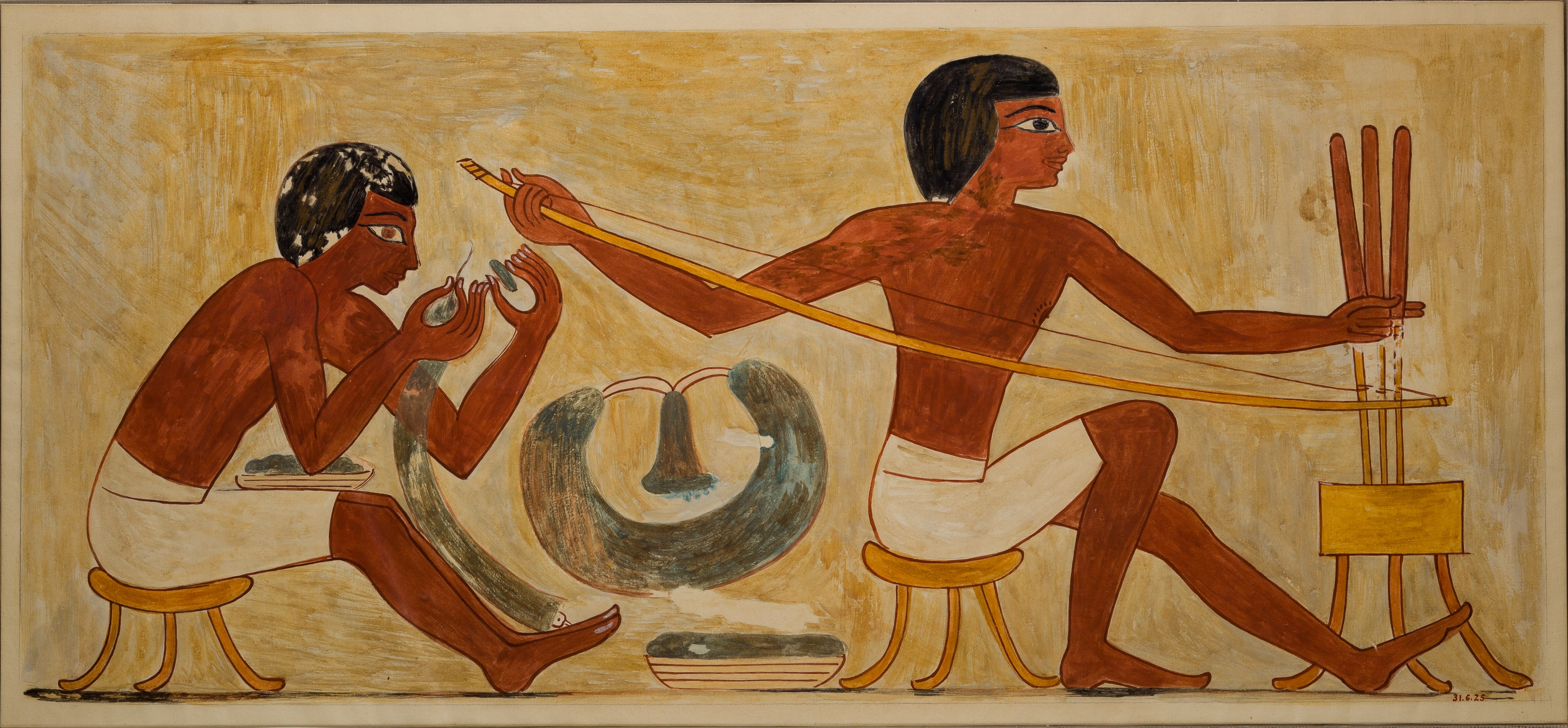
Artisans drilling and stringing beads to create usekh collars; Tomb of Rekhmire (TT100)

The usekh collar was worn over the shoulders and around the neck and was fastened at the back. It was typically made from faience, glass, stone, or metal beads, produced in a wide range of colors and strung together with linen thread. Scenes depicting the manufacture of usekh collars appear in a small number of ancient Egyptian tombs.

Over time, the usekh underwent numerous variations in form. These changes may reflect shifting mythological concepts or regional differences within Egypt.

== Deities ==
A scene in the Fourth Dynasty tomb of Wepemnofret at Giza associates the usekh collar with dwarfs and the deity Ptah. Bernd Scheel has argued that Ptah, who is sometimes depicted wearing a broad collar, protected the deceased through the collar, and that dwarfs had access to this protective power through their role in manufacturing such ornaments.

In the Fifth Dynasty tomb chapel of Akhethotep—originally located at the Saqqara burial ground and now housed in the Louvre—one scene distinguishes between two types of collars: the broad collar and the šnw, or "encircling", collar.

== Gallery ==
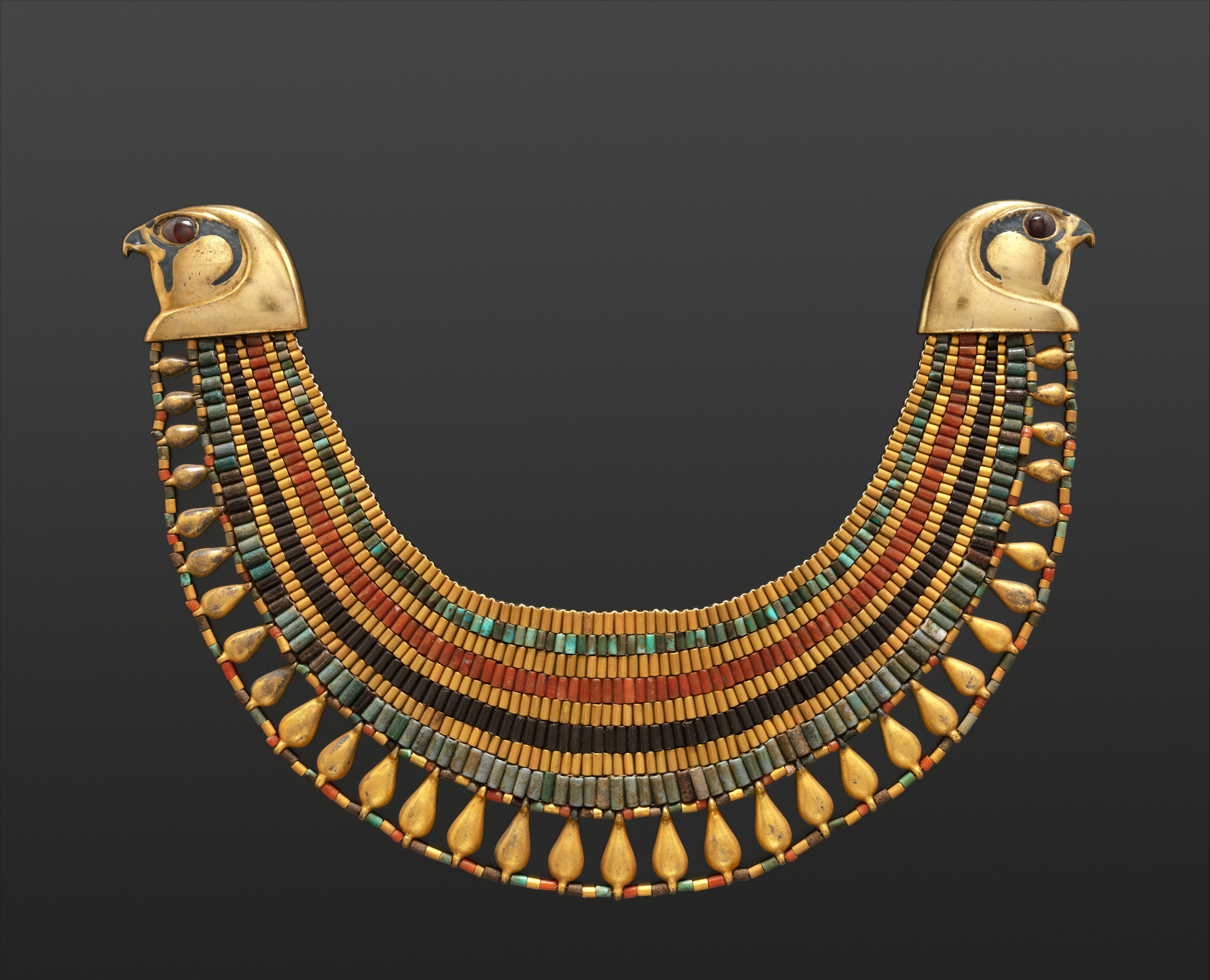
Broad collar of Senebtisi, 1850–1775 BC; faience, gold, carnelian and turquoise; Metropolitan Museum of Art

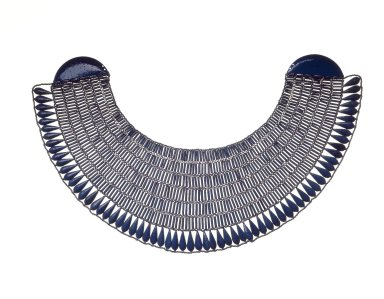
Broad Collar, c. 1336–1327 BC, c. 1327–1323 BC, or c.1323–1295 BC; faience; Brooklyn Museum

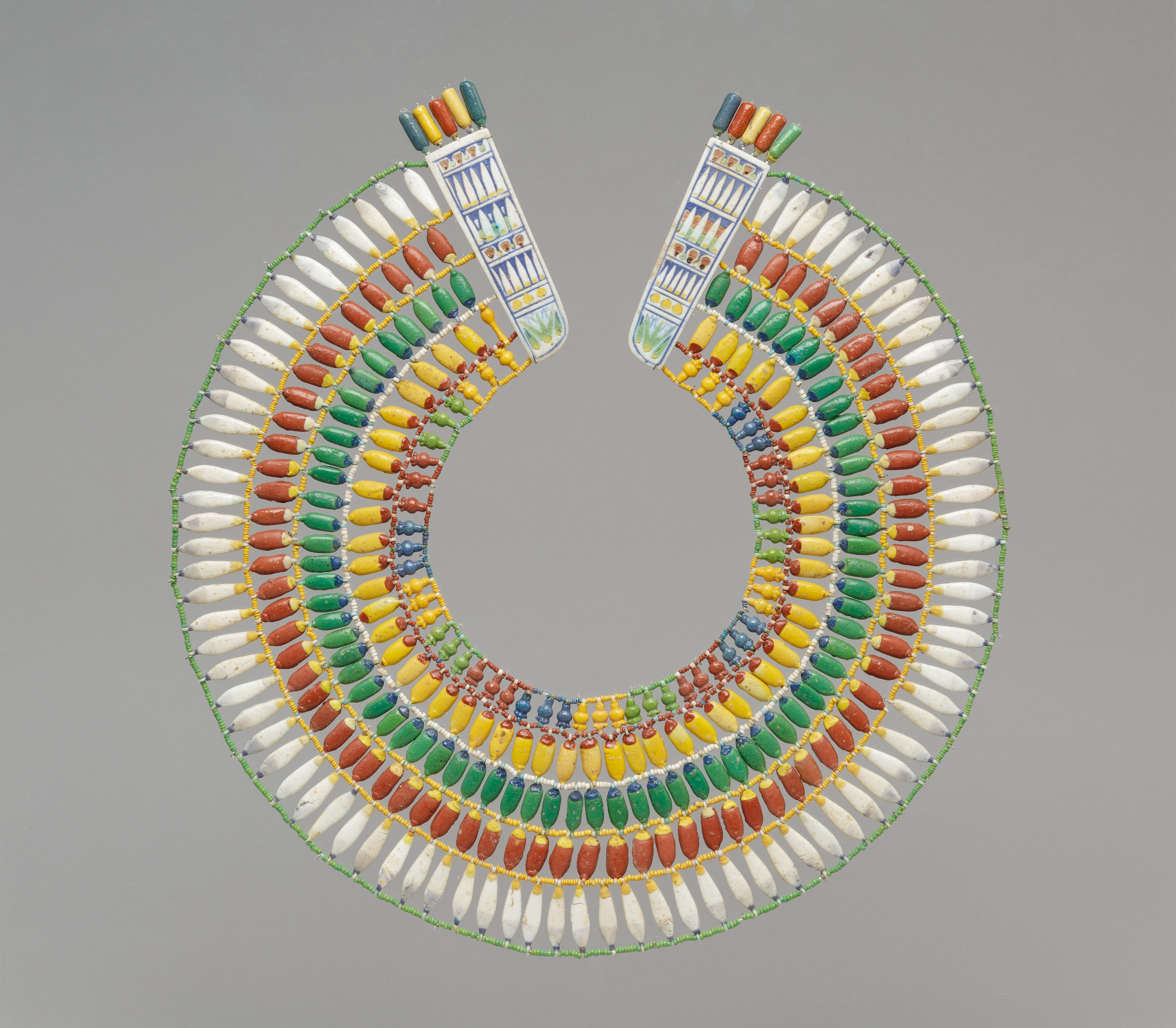
Broad Collar, c. 1353–1336 BC, faience, Metropolitan Museum of Art

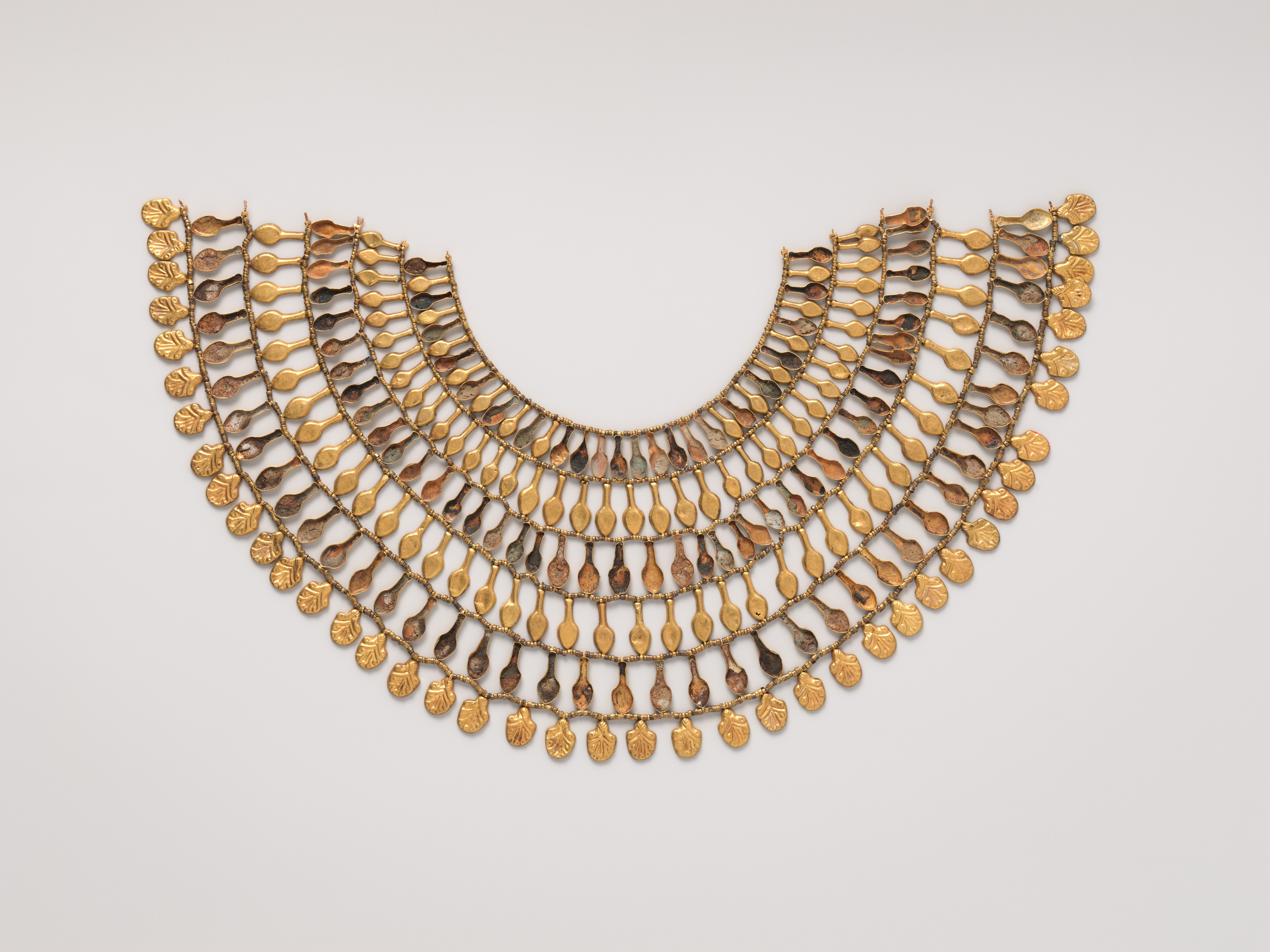
Broad Collar of Nefer Amulets from the Tomb of the Three Foreign Wives of Thutmose III, c. 1504–1450 BC, gold, glass, Egyptian blue, Metropolitan Museum of Art.

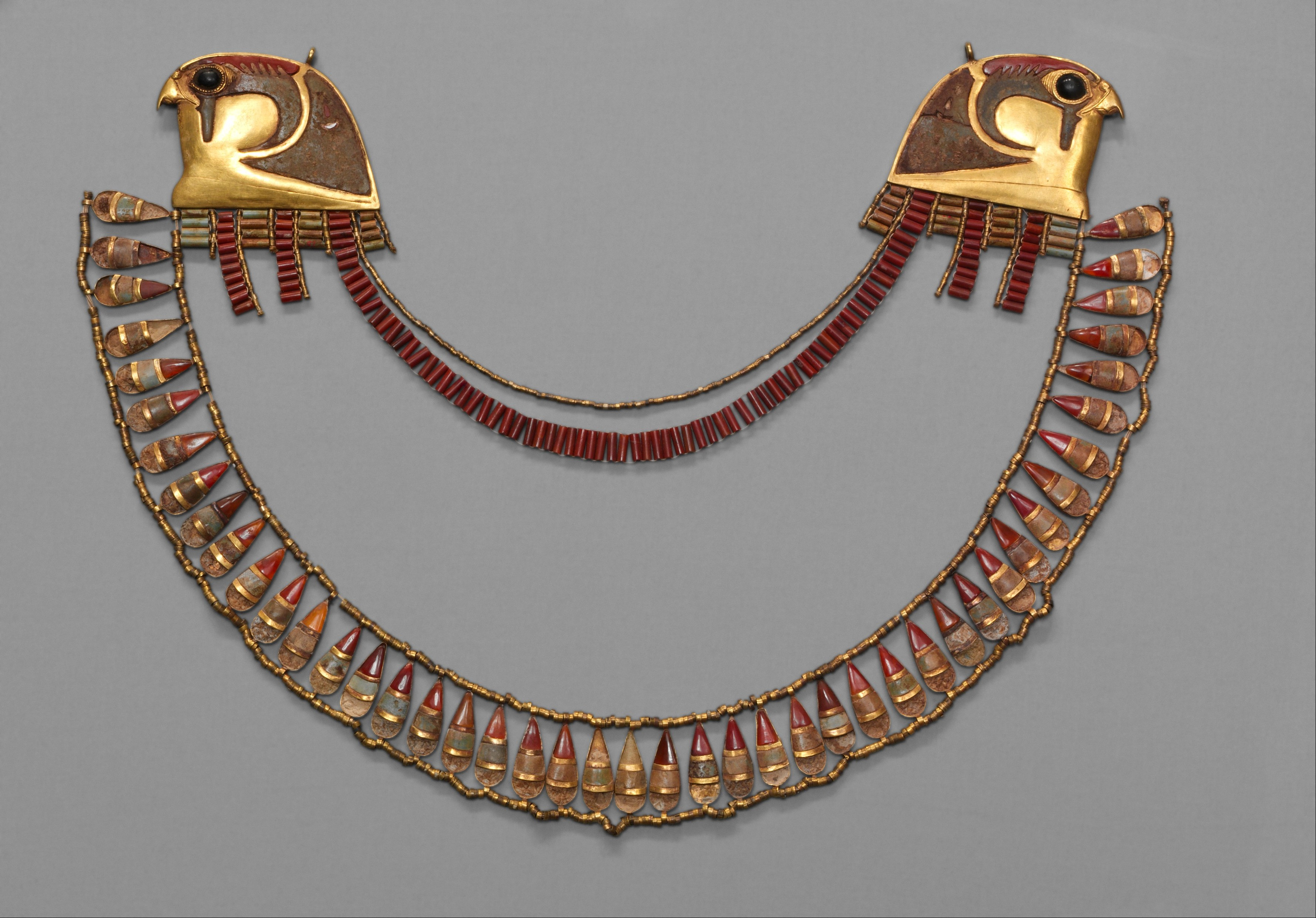
Broad Collar, 1479–1425 B.C; gold, carnelian, obsidian, glass; Metropolitan Museum of Art

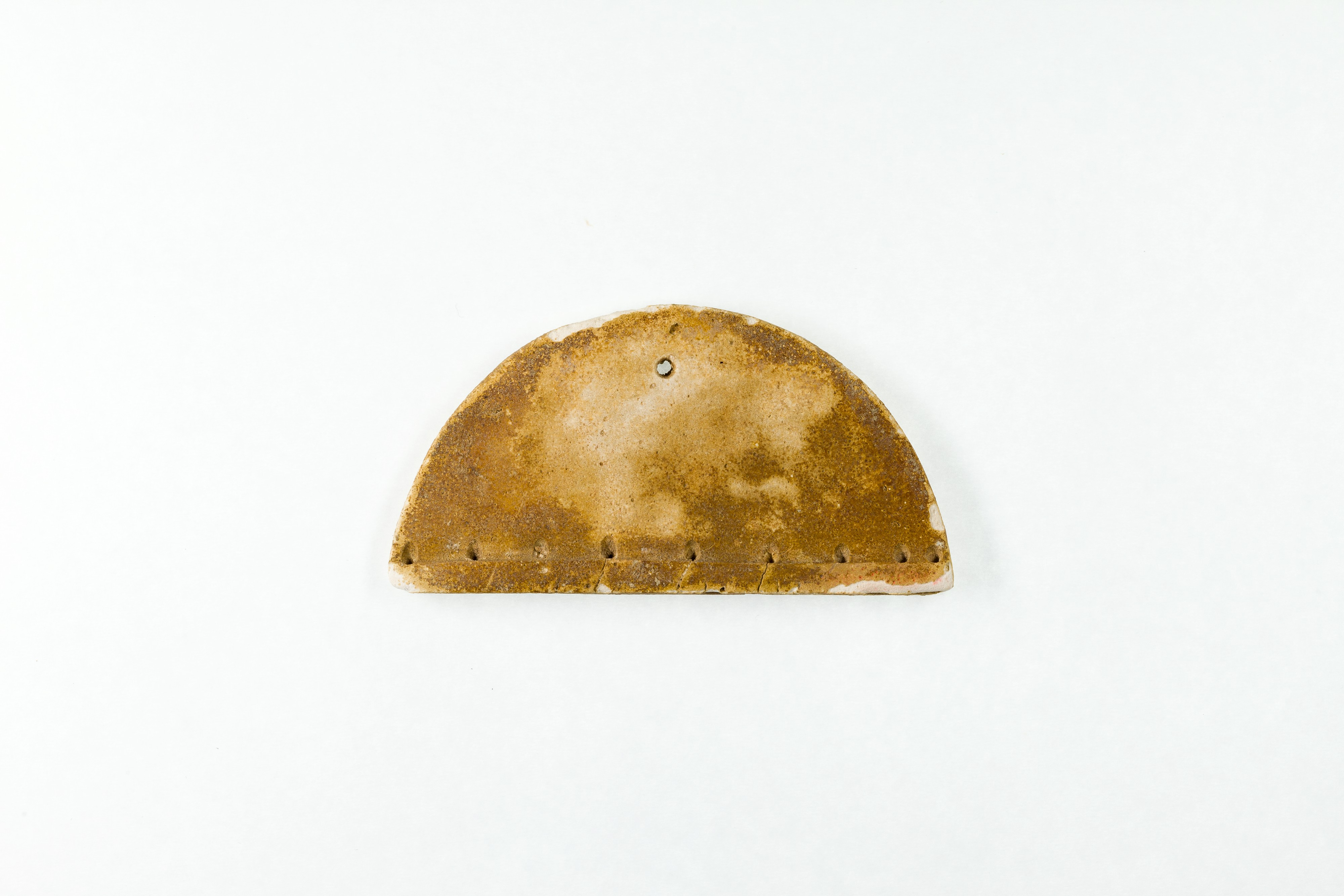
Broad Collar Terminal; Metropolitain Museum of Art

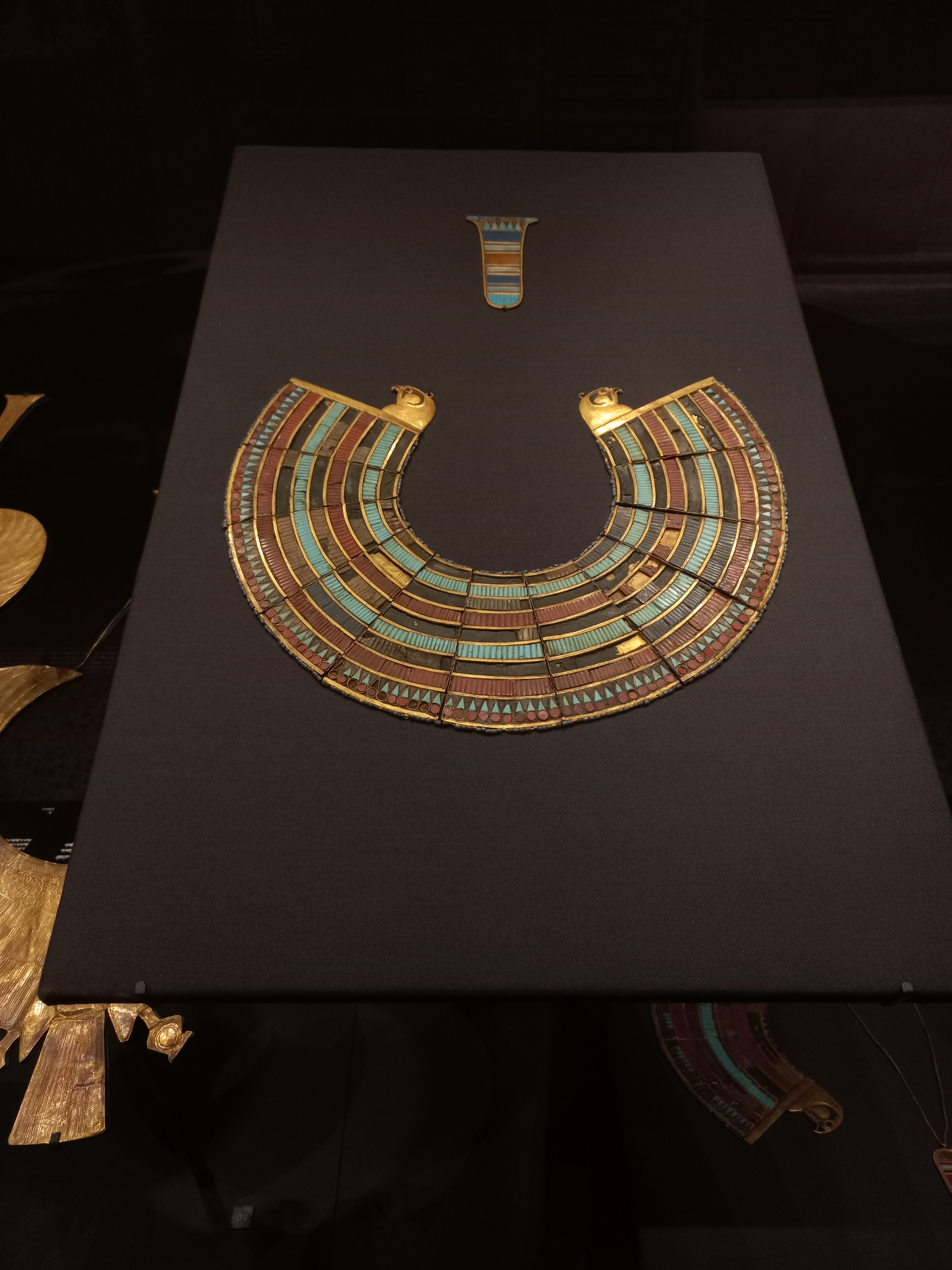
Tutankhamun's Usekh collar: the 18th Dynasty inlaid with glass and gemstones, symbolizing divine protection and currently housed in the Grand Egyptian Museum.

== See also ==
- Clothing in ancient Egypt
