= Henut Taui =

Egyptian priestess

W10 t N17 N16
Henuttaui
in hieroglyphs
Era: 3rd Intermediate Period
(1069–664 BC)

Henut Taui, or Henuttaui, Henuttawy (fl. ca 1000 BCE) was an Ancient Egyptian priestess during the 21st Dynasty whose remains were mummified. She is mainly known for being one of the so-called "cocaine mummies".

== Background ==
Little to nothing is known about her life. She was a priestess and chantress in the temple of Amun at Thebes, and after her death her body was embalmed and buried in the Deir el-Bahari necropolis.

After the discovery of her tomb, her mummy became a property of the king of Bavaria (likely Ludwig I), who later donated it to the Staatliche Sammlung für Ägyptische Kunst of Munich, where it is still located today (ÄS 57). Her coffin, once located at the National Archaeology Museum of Lisbon, is now in Munich too.

== Rediscovery ==
In 1992, German toxicologist Svetlana Balabanova discovered traces of cocaine, hashish and nicotine on Henut Taui's hair as well as on the hair of several other mummies of the museum, which is significant in that the only source for cocaine and nicotine had at that time been considered to be the coca and tobacco plants native to the Americas, and were not thought to have been present in Africa until after Columbus voyaged to the Americas.

This result was interpreted by theorists and supporters of contacts between pre-Columbian people and ancient Egyptians, as a proof for their claims. The findings are controversial because while other researchers have also detected the presence of cocaine and nicotine in Egyptian mummies, two successive analyses on other groups of Egyptian mummies and human remains failed to fully reproduce Balabanova's results, and some showing positive results only for nicotine.

After these experiments, even assuming that cocaine was actually found on mummies, it is possible that this could be contamination which occurred after the discovery of the mummies. The same argument can be applied to nicotine but, in addition, various plants other than tobacco are a source of nicotine and two of these, Withania somnifera and Apium graveolens, were known and used by ancient Egyptians. David J Counsell notes that "Duke’s Phytochemical and Ethnobotanical Database lists twenty-three nicotine-containing plants in addition to tobacco (Nicotiana tabacum). Of these, two – Withania somnifera and Apium graveolens – were known to the Egyptians (Manniche 1993), and the latter, celery, was the more likely to be used as a food." Sources of nicotine other than tobacco and sources of cocaine in the Old World are discussed by the British biologist Duncan Edlin.
