= MMA 59 =

Ancient Egyptian tomb

Theban Tomb MMA 59
- Burial site of Henuttawy (F)
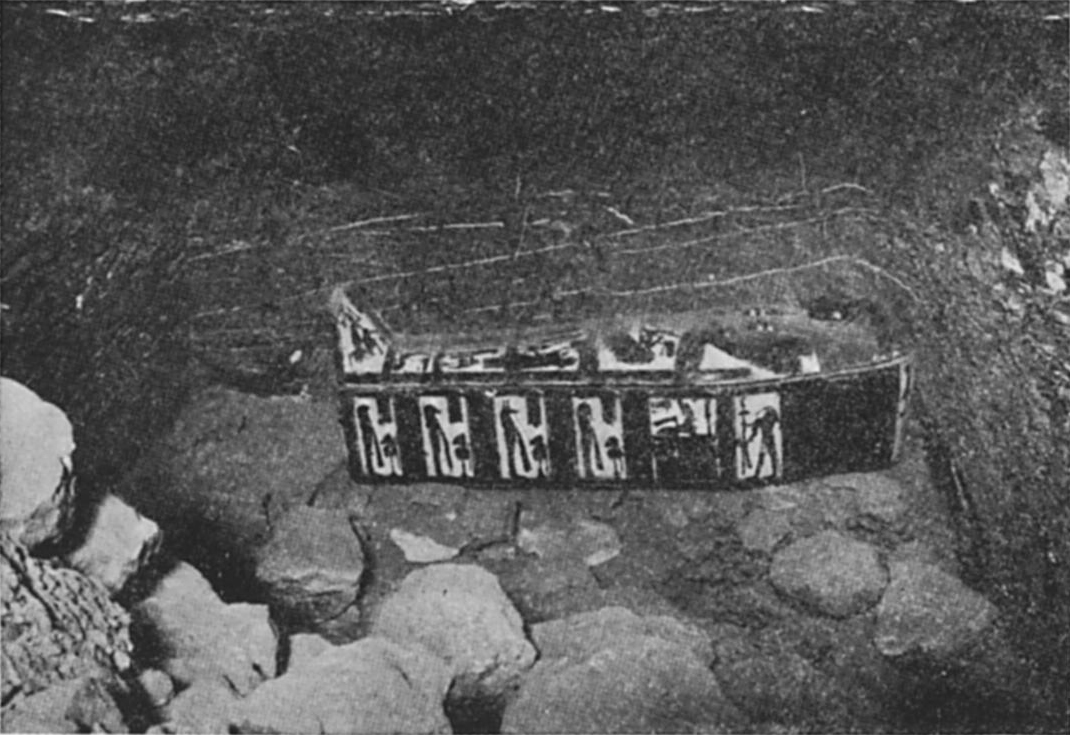
- The coffin of Henuttawy as found in the tomb by Winlock.

- Location within Egypt
- Location: Deir el-Bahari
- Discovered: Twenty-first Dynasty of Egypt
- Excavated by: Discovered and excavated by Winlock during the 1923–24 season
- Decoration: none

The Theban Tomb known as MMA 59 is located in Deir el-Bahari. It forms part of the Theban Necropolis, situated on the west bank of the Nile opposite Luxor. The tomb is the burial place of the Ancient Egyptian Henuttawy, who dates to the 21st Dynasty and was a Singer of Amun.

Henuttawy was apparently a regular citizen and not related to the royal family. She was buried in the tomb previously carved for a man named Minmose. The lid of the outer coffin was not pegged down according to Winlock. Inside the inner coffin the mummy was covered by a wooden board. Henuttawy is depicted with an elaborate collar and below that a carefully painted bead-net covering. A row of hieroglyphics on the front of the mummy board invoke the goddess Mut. The mummy did not fit the coffin and the feet were damaged when the mummy was forced inside.

== Gallery ==
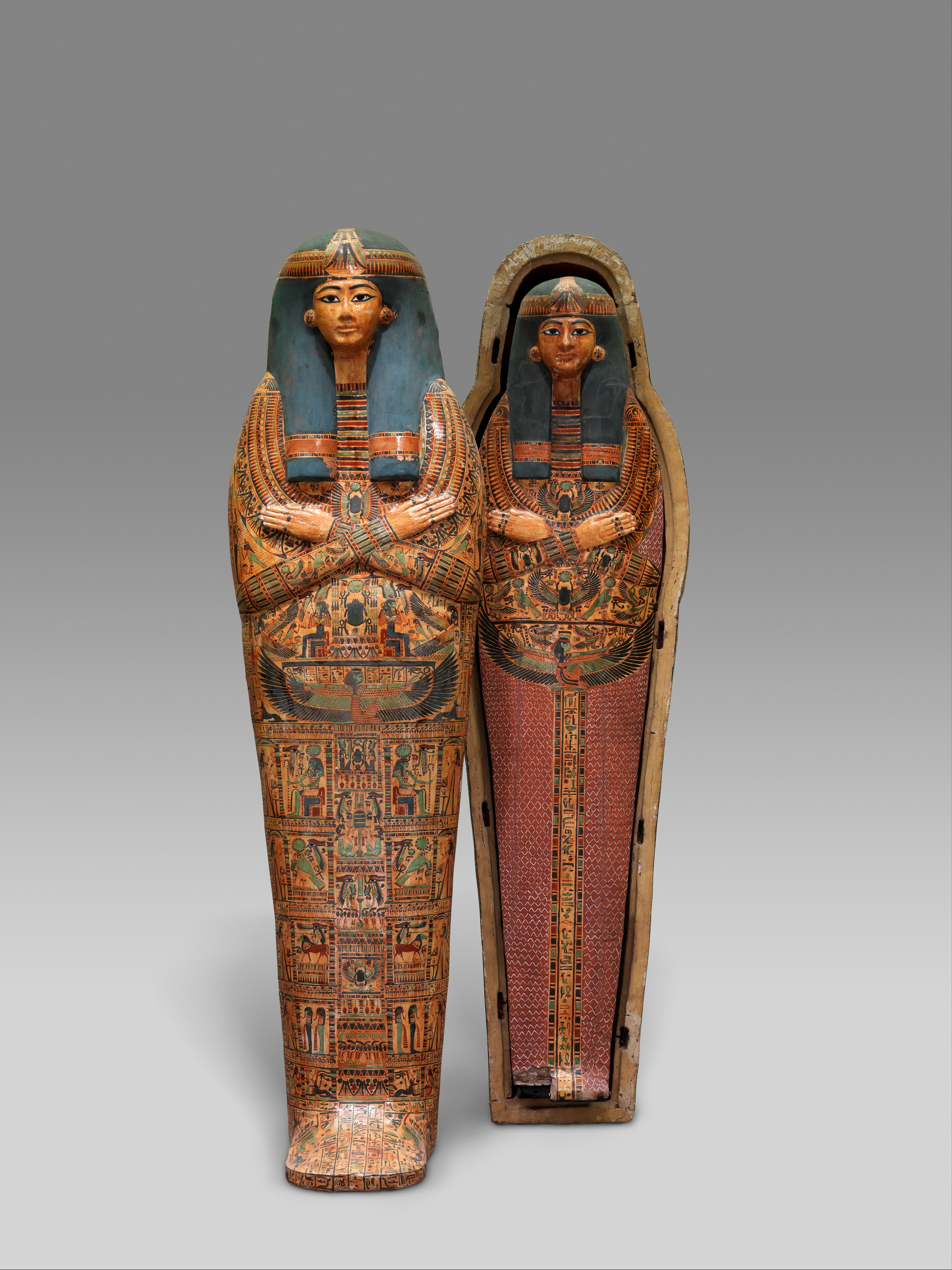
The Inner coffin of Henuttawy (F), MET Museum

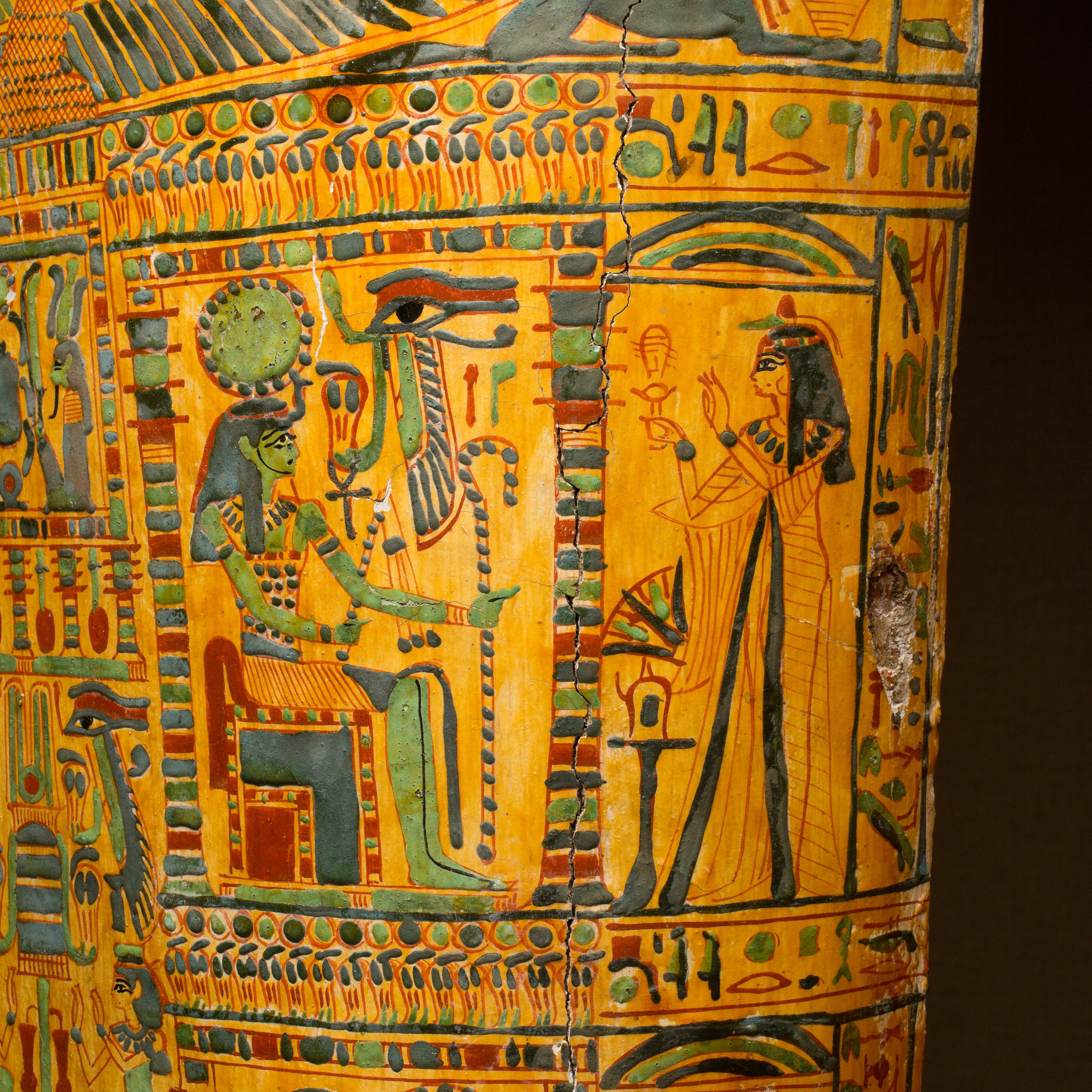
Detail of Inner Coffin.

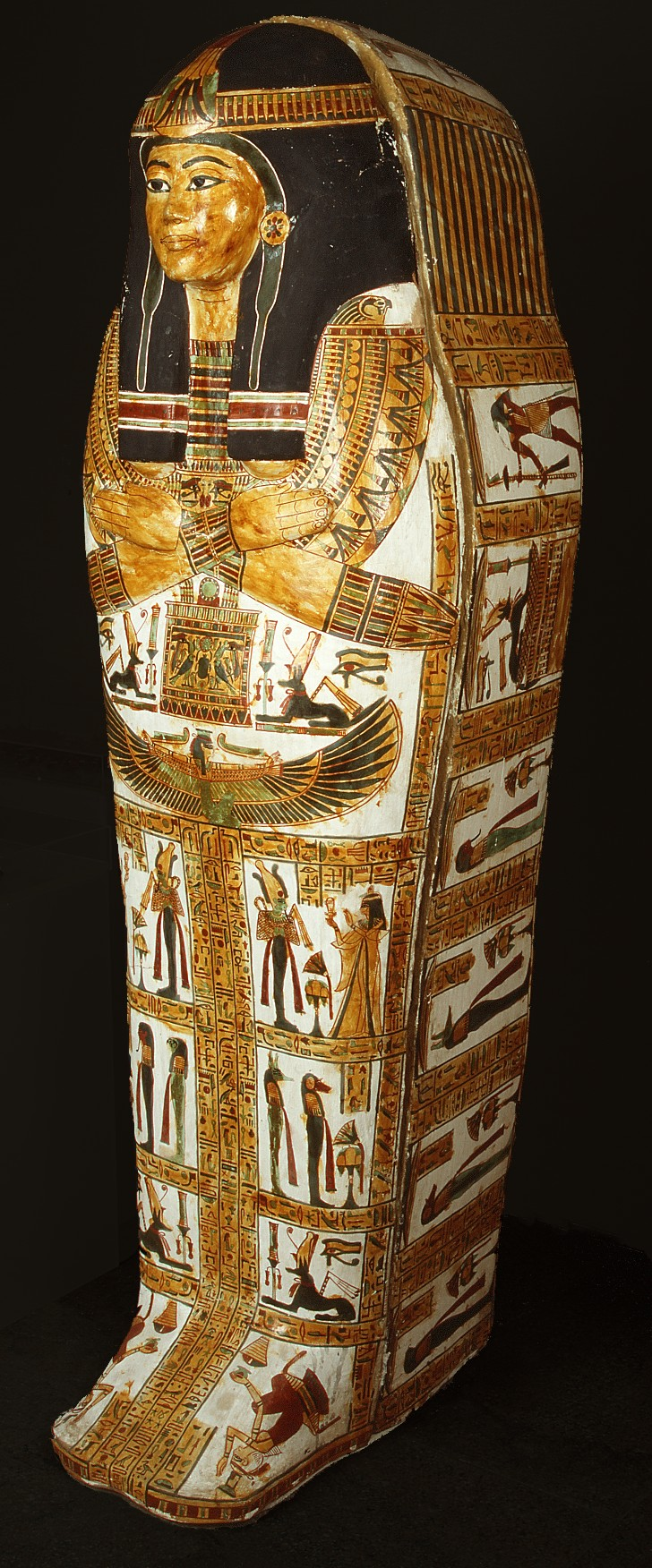
Outer coffin of Henuttawy

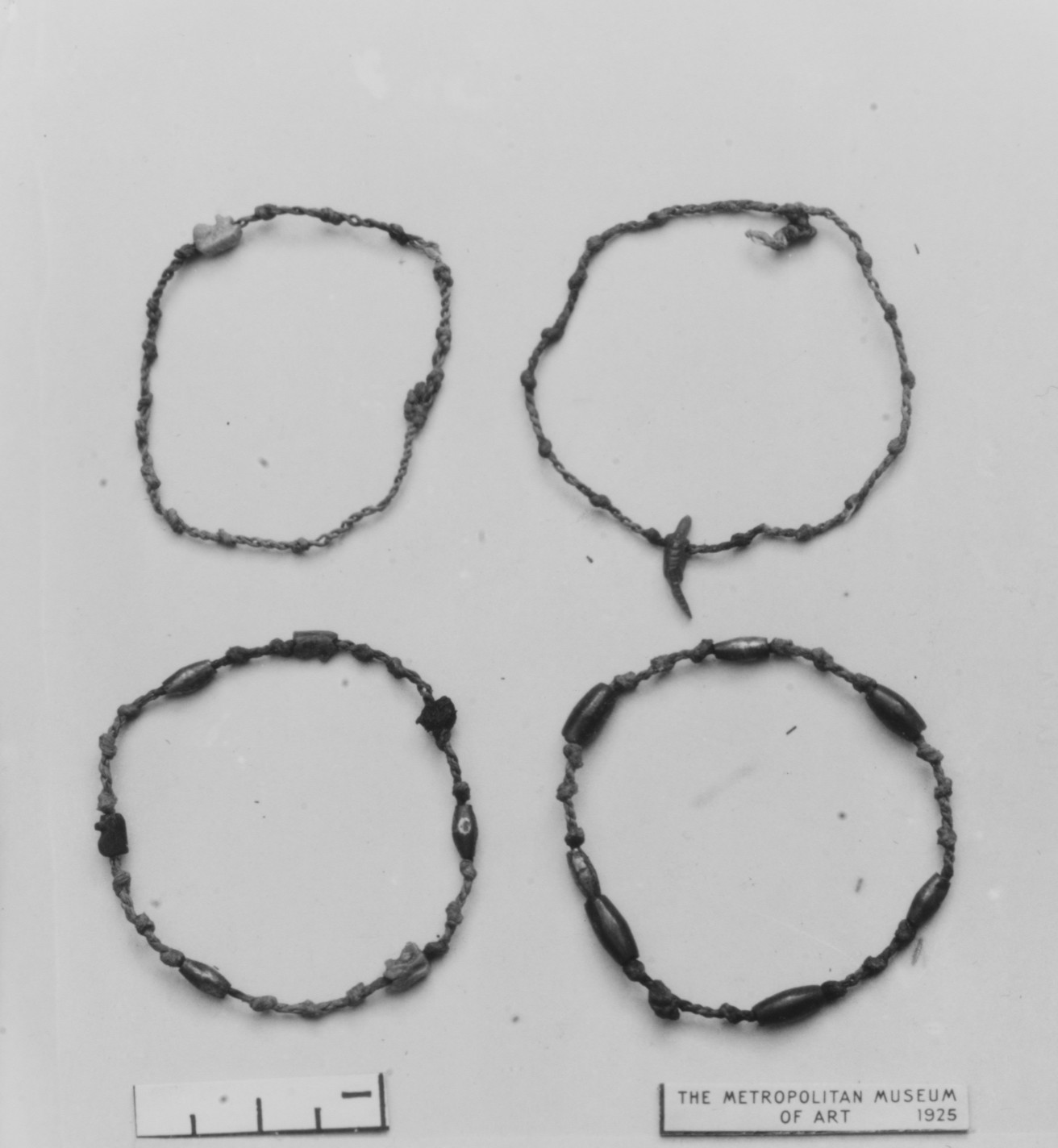
Bracelets from the tomb

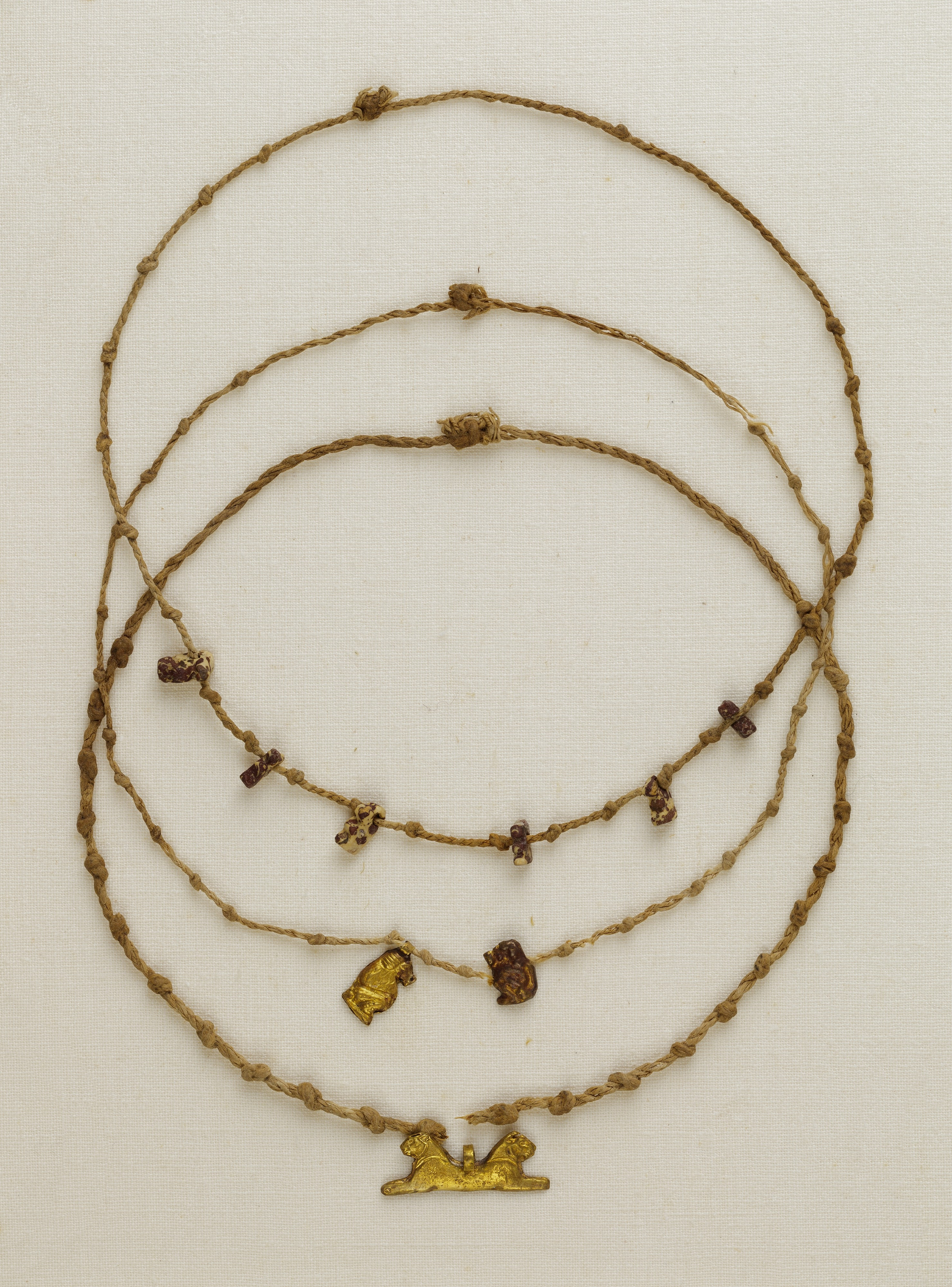
Necklaces from the tomb

== See also ==
- List of MMA Tombs
