= Mortuary Temple of Mentuhotep III =

Unfinished ancient Egyptian temple

Mortuary Temple of Mentuhotep III TT281
- Burial site of Mentuhotep III
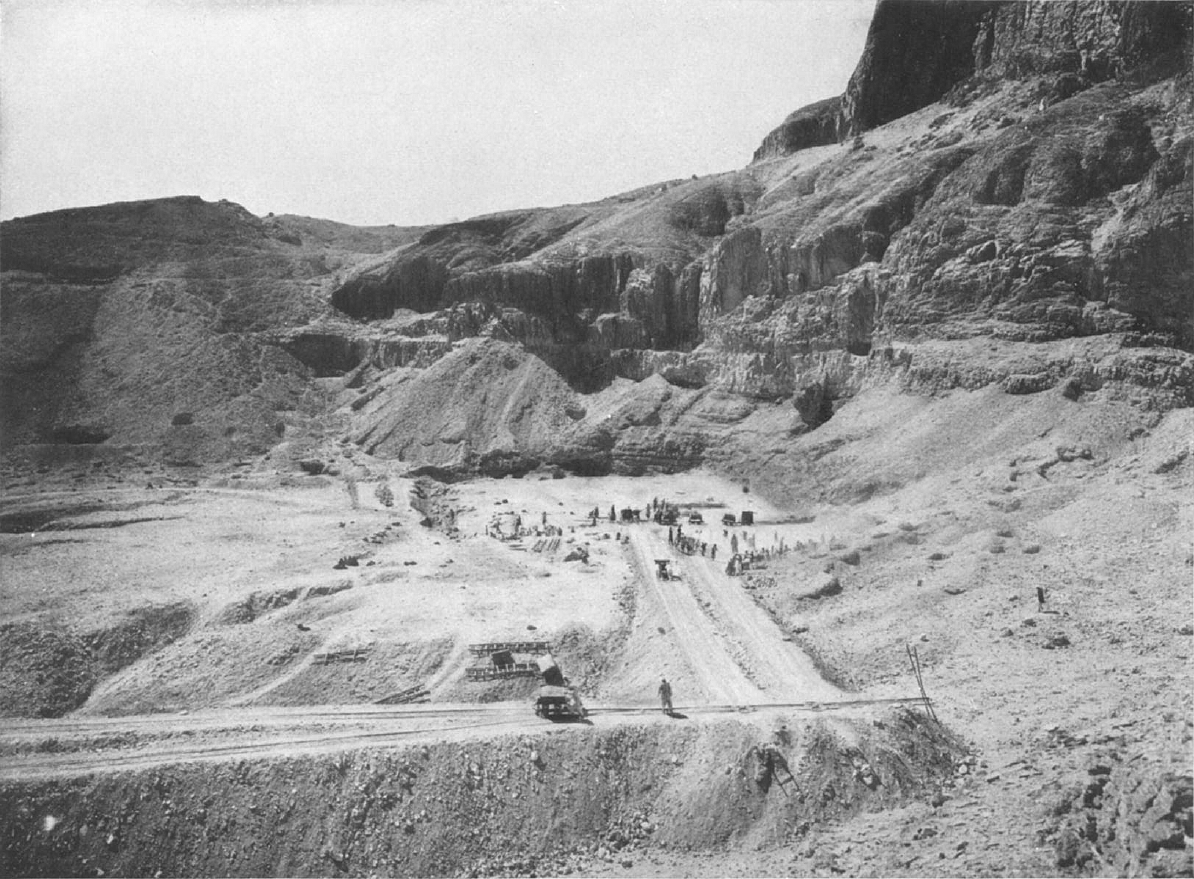
- The unfinished temple in 1920

- Location within Egypt
- Coordinates: 25°44′01.5″N 32°36′05.9″E
- Location: Valley of Heqanakht (Deir el-Bahari), Egypt
- Discovered: 1903–1904
- Excavated by: Robert Mond (1903–1904); Herbert Winlock (1920-1921)
- ← Previous; TT280 Next → TT282

The Mortuary Temple of Mentuhotep III is an unfinished ancient Egyptian temple located at Deir el-Bahari, in the Theban Necropolis, near the city of Luxor. Had it been completed, the temple would probably have resembled the famous mortuary temple of Mentuhotep II located nearby. The only part of the temple to have been completed to some extent is the king's tomb, the probable burial place of the pharaoh Mentuhotep III (20th century BC), carved into the Theban mountain. Upon its discovery, the hypogeum was identified as a private tomb and numbered TT281 according to the numbering system for Theban tombs of the Valley of the Nobles.

== Description ==
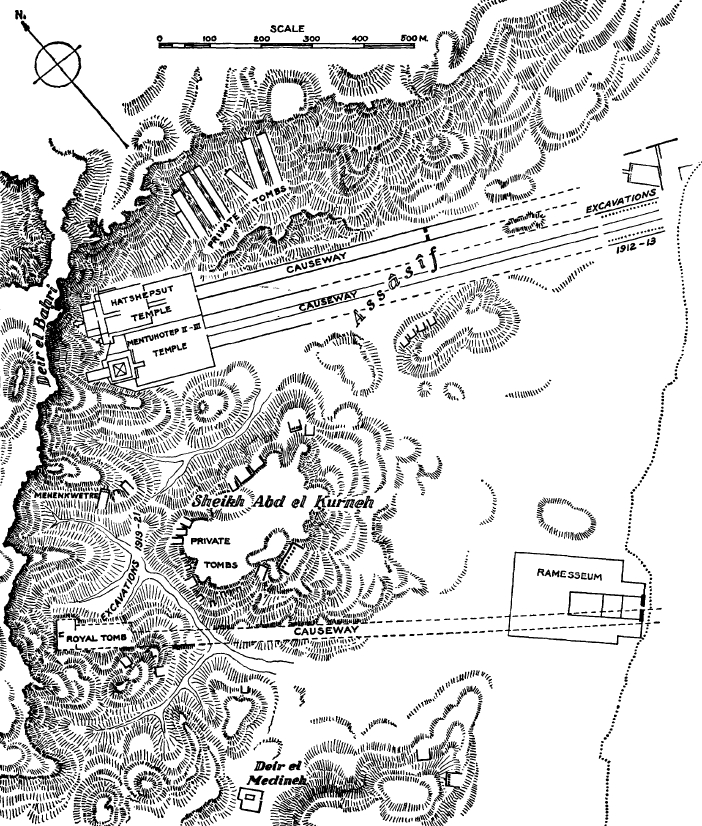
Plan of Deir el-Bahari including a reconstruction of the unfinished temple.

The mortuary temple of Mentuhotep III is an unfinished ancient Egyptian temple located in the Theban Necropolis, on the west bank of the Nile opposite the city of Luxor (ancient Thebes). The temple lies south of Deir el-Bahari, in the Valley of Heqanakht situated between the Theban mountain and the Sheikh Abd el-Qurna hill. It is located 600 metres southwest of the mortuary temple of Mentuhotep II.

Based on the surviving remains, the temple, once completed, would likely have had a layout similar to that of the mortuary temple of Mentuhotep II at Deir el-Bahari: a temple constructed on a platform at the foot of the mountain, a tomb excavated into the mountain itself, and a causeway several kilometres long linking the temple to the banks of the Nile.

Little remains of the temple today: only the vestiges of a causeway leading to the temple platform and a sloping passage carved into the rock face survive. The platform was levelled into the mountain's limestone, requiring the extraction of 70,000 to 80,000 cubic metres of rock. The terrace measured 100 metres wide by 50 metres long, only half of the expected surface area (a square of 100 metres on each side). Construction of the temple itself never progressed beyond the stage of foundation trench excavation. The only contemporary masonry structure on the terrace is a brick wall surrounding the platform. A three-room brick structure was later built on the platform, probably during the New Kingdom.

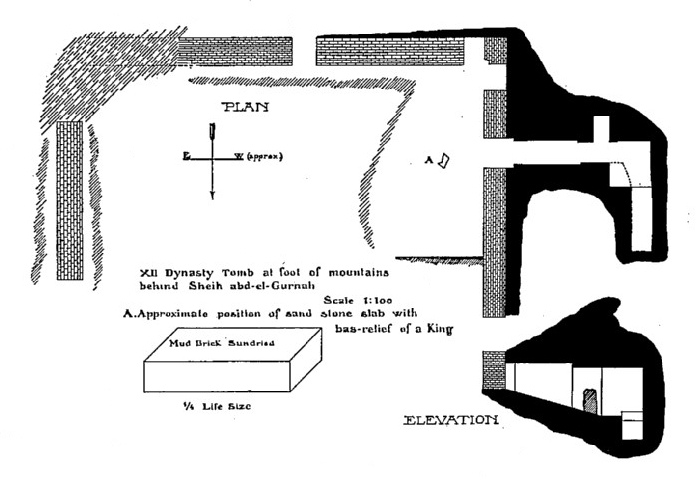
Plan of the tomb and part of the platform.

The hypogeum is also unfinished. A passage was excavated for 35 metres, and the end of the corridor was apparently hastily enlarged in order to create a burial chamber. The chamber was constructed of red quartzite blocks and its walls were lined with limestone instead of the expected granite. The ceiling is corbelled. Hieratic graffiti carved near the tomb appear to have been written by priests of the king's funerary cult and indicate that, despite the unfinished state of the monument, the king's burial did indeed take place there.

The causeway intended to connect the temple to the floodplain below would have measured 1.2 kilometres in length and 80 metres in width, with a gradient of 4%. It would have emerged exactly at the site occupied several centuries later by the Ramesseum. Construction work had begun at both ends of the causeway, but the two sections were never connected, and the eastern section was later buried by the foundations of the Ramesseum.

== Excavations ==
The unfinished mortuary temple was discovered by the archaeologist Robert Mond during excavations during the Theban Necropolis in the winter of 1903–1904. He noted the presence of a court surrounded by brick walls as well as a plundered tomb opening directly in the court. The archaeologist dated the site to the Twelfth Dynasty of Egypt but was unable to determine its precise nature. Mond discovered fragments of painted limestone bas-reliefs depicting a king and a funerary barque inside the tomb. He also reported the presence of hundreds of votive cups and pots abandoned in the court and inside the tomb. The tomb was later classified as one of the many private tombs of the Valley of the Nobles and numbered TT281.

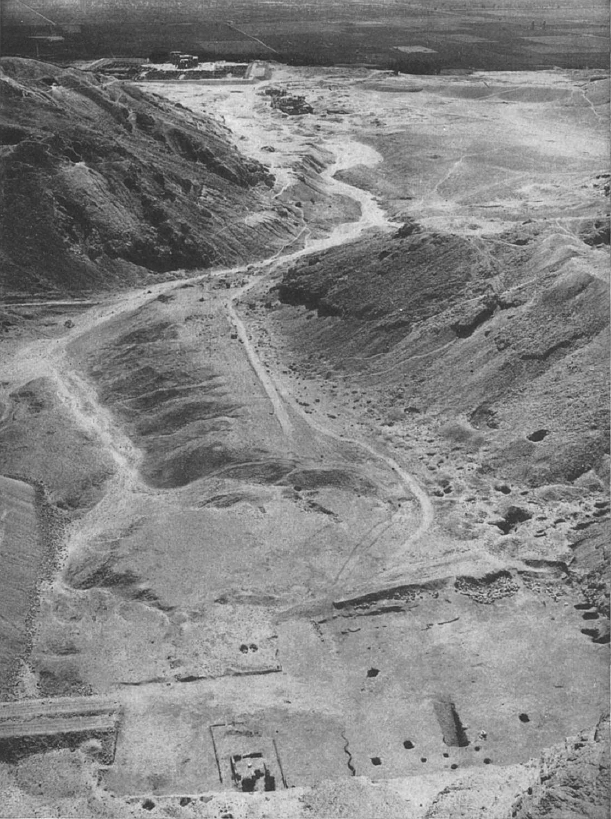
View of the rear of the temple from above, with the causeway leading toward the Ramesseum in the background.

A few years later, in 1914, the archaeologist Herbert E. Winlock visited the site and realized that the court discovered by Robert Mond was in fact a terrace carved into the mountain rock. This platform was associated with an unfinished causeway directed toward the Ramesseum below. Winlock thereby connected the site with the remains of an ancient causeway previously discovered near the Ramesseum, whose destination had remained unknown. The Egyptologist concluded that the site discovered by Mond was actually an unfinished mortuary temple similar to that of Mentuhotep II at Deir el-Bahari. Herbert Winlock returned to Egypt after the First World War and participated in the Metropolitan Museum of Art excavation campaign of winter 1920–1921 aimed at finding royal tombs of the Eleventh Dynasty of Egypt around Deir el-Bahari. Winlock completely cleared the court discovered by Mond and confirmed that it was the terrace of an unfinished temple. He discovered a building foundation trench containing foundation deposits of meat. Since the tomb associated with the temple discovered by Mond was much smaller than that of Mentuhotep II, Winlock initially hypothesised that it belonged to a queen or high official. The archaeologist uncovered a dozen shaft tombs inside and outside the brick enclosure wall (numbered MMA1001–1011, MMA1013 and MMA1016–1020), some dating long after the Eleventh Dynasty of Egypt, but failed to find any royal tomb on the site. He ultimately concluded that the tomb excavated by Robert Mond was indeed the royal tomb—probably unfinished—associated with the temple, and did not exclude the possibility that it had been used by a king. He finally attributed it to the pharaoh Mentuhotep III of the Eleventh Dynasty of Egypt.

== Identification ==
The formal identification of the builder of the temple and tomb is complicated by the incomplete state of construction and by the absence of inscriptions on the site. The similarity and geographical proximity of the unfinished temple to the mortuary temple of Mentuhotep II argue in favour of a more or less direct successor of Mentuhotep II. Herbert Winlock was the first to attribute the site to Mentuhotep III, and this conclusion has generally been accepted by scholars to the present day. Winlock explained that the temple probably could not be completed in time because of Mentuhotep III's advanced age when he acceded to the throne.

Winlock's identification is largely based on the proximity of the unfinished temple to tomb TT280. The latter belonged to Meketre, chief steward of Mentuhotep II and his successor Mentuhotep III. Unlike other dignitaries of this period, Meketre was not buried in the necropolis north of Deir el-Bahari but in the tomb TT280 located 300 metres from the unfinished temple, whose entrance and causeway point directly toward it. This has suggested that the nobleman deliberately chose to be buried near the king whom he served at the time of his death, namely Mentuhotep III.

Winlock's analysis was strongly rejected in the 1990s by Dorothea Arnold, an Egyptologist renowned for her work on the chronology of this period. She proposed instead that construction of the temple had begun under the pharaoh Amenemhat I. The king would then have abandoned the site when he moved the capital of the kingdom from Thebes to Lisht. Winlock himself had initially considered this theory (even though the precise chronology of the Eleventh Dynasty of Egypt was not yet firmly established at the time) before eventually favouring the Mentuhotep III hypothesis. Despite the value of Arnold's work, the proposal attributing the unfinished temple to Amenemhat I has convinced few scholars. No evidence suggests that Amenemhat I undertook any construction work at Thebes. Furthermore, a graffiti written by priests involved in the Beautiful Festival of the Valley on a promontory in the hills between the temple of Mentuhotep II and the unfinished temple probably mentions a royal funerary cult of Mentuhotep II and III. The discovery of a completely operational, contemporary offering table on the site of the unfinished temple appears to confirm the existence of this cult and thus the burial of a king in tomb TT281. This therefore excludes Amenemhat I, who was buried in a pyramid at Lisht.

== Bibliography ==
- Mond, Robert (1905). "Report of Work in the Necropolis of Thebes during the Winter of 1903-1904". Annales du service des antiquités de l'Égypte. VI: 65–96.
- Winlock, Herbert E. (1915). "The Theban Necropolis in the Middle Kingdom". American Journal of Semitic Languages and Literatures. 32 (1): 1–37. doi:10.1086/369782.
- Winlock, Herbert E. (1921). "The Egyptian Expedition 1920-1921: III. Excavations at Thebes". The Metropolitan Museum of Art Bulletin. 16 (11): 29–53. doi:10.2307/3254486.
- Winlock, Herbert E. (1942). Excavations at Deir El Bahri: 1911-1931. New York: Macmillan Company.
- Winlock, Herbert E. (1943). "The Eleventh Egyptian Dynasty". Journal of Near Eastern Studies. 2 (4): 249–283.
- Winlock, Herbert E. (1947). The Rise and Fall of the Middle Kingdom in Thebes. New York: Macmillan Company.
- Porter, Bertha; Moss, Rosalind; Burney, Ethel W. (1960). Topographical Bibliography of Ancient Egyptian Hieroglyphic Text, Reliefs, and Paintings, Volume I: The Theban Necropolis, Part 1: Private Tombs (PDF) (2 ed.). Oxford: Clarendon Press. ISBN 9780900416156.
- Porter, Bertha; Moss, Rosalind; Burney, Ethel W. (1972). Topographical Bibliography of Ancient Egyptian Hieroglyphic Text, Reliefs, and Paintings, Volume II: Theban Temples (PDF) (2 ed.). Oxford: Clarendon Press. ISBN 9780199200269.
- Arnold, Dorothea (1991). "Amenemhat I and the Early Twelfth Dynasty at Thebes". The Metropolitan Museum of Art Bulletin. 26: 5–48.
- Wilkinson, Richard H. (2000). The Complete Temples of Egypt. London: Thames & Hudson. ISBN 9780500051009.
- Dodson, Aidan (2016). The Royal Tombs of Ancient Egypt. Barnsley: Pen and Sword Books. ISBN 9781473821590.
- Slinger, Katherine (2022). Tomb Families: Private Tomb Distribution in the New Kingdom Theban Necropolis. Oxford: Archaeopress Publishing Ltd. ISBN 9781803270364.
- Willems, Harco (2022). "Egypt's Middle Kingdom: A View from Within". In Karen Radner; Nadine Moeller; D. T. Potts (eds.). The Oxford History of the Ancient Near East, Volume II: From the End of the Third Millennium BC to the Fall of Babylon. Oxford: Oxford University Press. pp. 656–727. doi:10.1093/oso/9780190687571.003.0019. ISBN 9780190687571.
