= Canadiana =

Class of books of and about Canadian topics

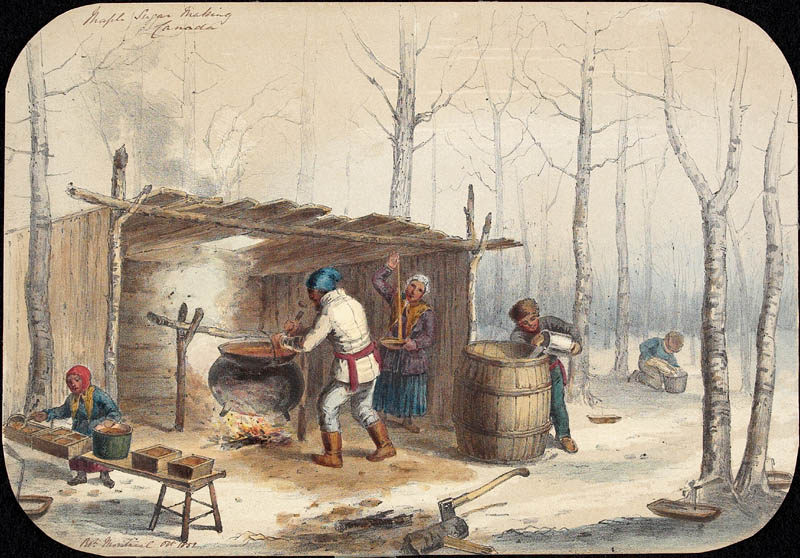
"Sugar Making in Montreal" by Cornelius Krieghoff (October 1852), part of the Peter Winkworth Collection of Canadiana at Library and Archives Canada.

Canadiana is a term used to describe things (e.g., books, historical documents, works of art, music and artifacts), ideas, or activities that concern or are distinctive of Canada, its peoples and its culture, especially works of literature and other cultural products. It can also refer to the collection of such materials, such as in cultural fields like music or art.

As a category often seen in bookstores and in research libraries, Canadiana can describe works produced in Canada (including literature and non-fiction), works about Canada, and works published outside of Canada that are of special interest or significance to Canada. More generally, the term can also include books that do not necessarily deal with Canada or Canadians themselves, but were written by Canadians or people who were Canadians at some point in their life. Two books by Canadian author Douglas Coupland—Souvenir of Canada and Souvenir of Canada 2—for example, are collections of images of pop-culture Canadiana.

== Name ==
The suffixes -ana and -iana are commonly used in reference to a collection of things that relate to a specific place, person, etc. Similar to the concept of Canadiana is that of Americana for the United States.The term Canuckiana has been used (rarely), in humorous contexts, as a synonym for Canadiana.

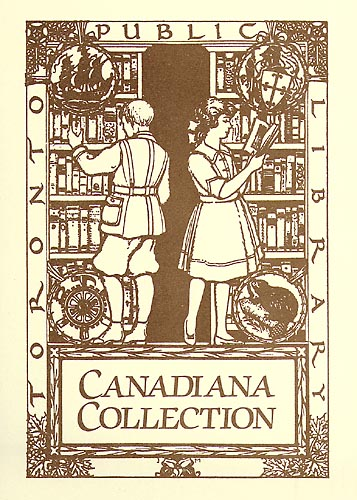
J. E. H. MacDonald's Toronto Public Library Canadiana bookplate

== Library system ==
Since 1950, one of the specific mandates of the Library and Archives Canada (LAC) has been to document the published heritage of Canada through a comprehensive bibliography—titled Canadiana: The National Bibliography of Canada.

In OCLC's WorldShare integrated library system, the Canadiana authority file contains two record types:

1. Canadiana Subject Headings In English, a list of subject headings in the English language, using controlled vocabulary, to "access and express the topic content of documents on Canada and Canadian topics." As of 2021, the database contains around 2,500 subject and geographic name headings in English. When cataloguing in English, LAC uses the Library of Congress/NACO Authority File (LC/NAF).
2. Canadiana Name Authorities in French, used by LAC and other Canadian libraries when creating bibliographic descriptions in French. The database contains over 600,000 records for names, names/titles, uniform titles, and series titles.

== See also ==
- -ana – English language suffix
- Americana (culture) – Materials characteristic of the United States of America
- Bibliography of Canada
- Canadian art
- Canadian literature
- Canuck – Term for a Canadian
- Canadian studies
- Culture of Canada
- History of Canada
