= International Bibliography of Periodical Literature =

- Producer: K. G. Saur (Germany)
- Languages: German and English

Access
- Providers: de Gruyter

Coverage
- Disciplines: Humanities, social sciences, all related scholarly topics
- Record depth: Author, journal title, year of publication, year, journal number, page number; Languages of article and available abstracts; subject heading, reference; Subject field of the article and the journal publisher
- Format coverage: Abstracts, indexing
- Temporal coverage: 1983–present
- Geospatial coverage: International
- No. of records: 3.3 million
- Update frequency: Monthly (print); daily (online)

Links
- Website: degruyter.com/ibz

International Bibliography of Periodical Literature (IBZ: Internationale Bibliographie der Zeitschriftenliteratur) covers the academic journal literature in the humanities, social sciences, and related disciplines. Coverage includes journals from 40 countries and in more than 40 languages. Subject indexing is based on the Subject Headings Authority File (Schlagwortnormdatei) and Name Authority File (Personennormdatei) published by the German National Library. The file size is over 3.3 million records from over 11,000 journals, with 120,000 records added annually. (ISSN 1865-0279; ISBN 978-3-598-69006-8).

== IBR ==
IBR represents International Bibliography of Book Reviews of Scholarly Literature in the Humanities and Social Sciences (Internationale Bibliographie der Rezensionen geistes- und sozialwissenschaftlicher Literatur) (ISSN 1865-0228) is a bibliographical database covering scholarly works. It is published by K. G. Saur.
