= GKD =

GKD may refer to:

- Gemeinsame Körperschaftsdatei (Corporate Bodies Authority File)
- GKD sports cars, a British car manufacturer
- Glycerol kinase deficiency
- Gökçeada Airport, in Çanakkale Province, Turkey
- Klovićevi Dvori Gallery, in Zagreb, Croatia
