= TT280 =

Ancient Egyptian tomb

Theban tomb TT280
- Burial site of Meketre
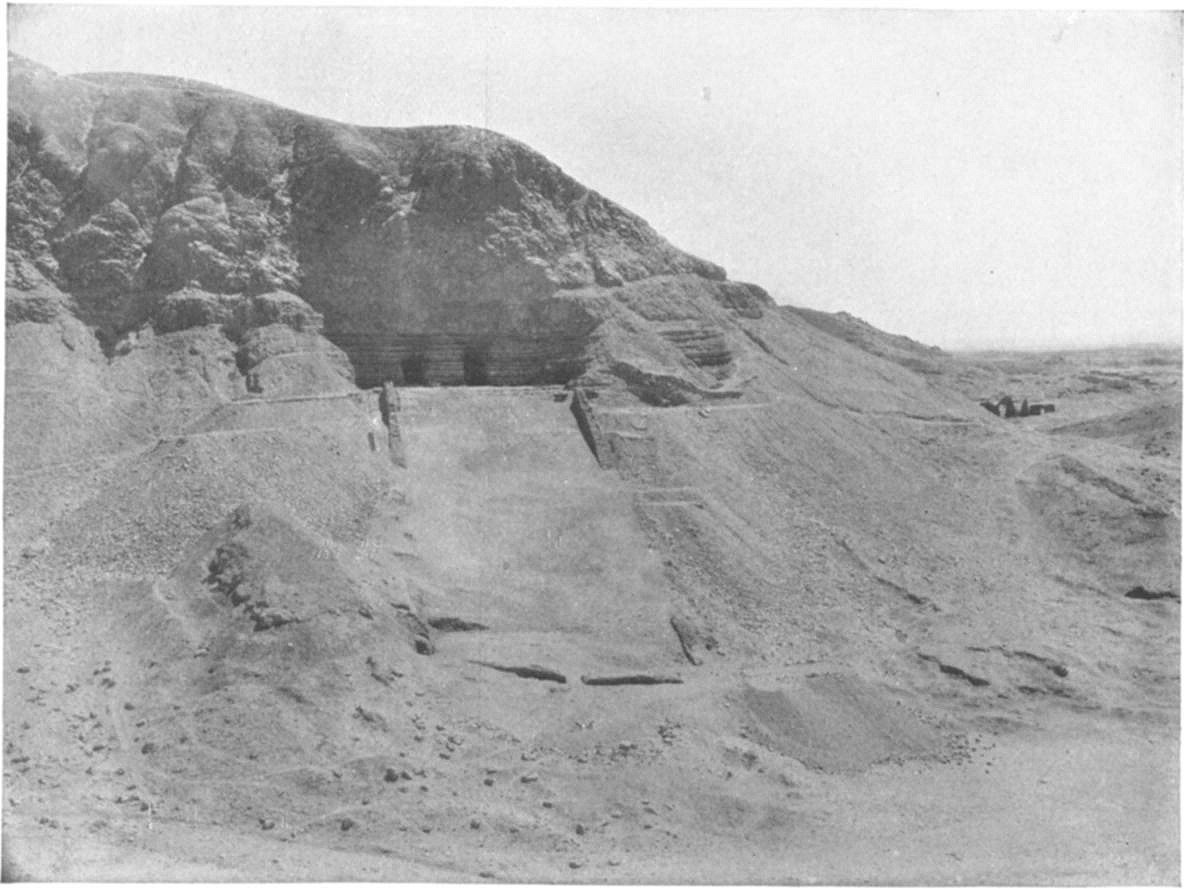
- Double entrance of the tomb in the hill with its causeway at the forefront

- Location within Egypt
- Coordinates: 25°44′08″N 32°36′15″E
- Location: Sheikh Abd el-Qurna, Theban Necropolis
- Discovered: 1895
- Excavated by: Georges Daressy (1895); Herbert Winlock (1920)
- ← Previous; TT279 Next → TT281

Tomb TT280 (MMA 1101), located in Sheikh Abd el-Qurna, part of the Theban Necropolis, is the burial place of the ancient Egyptian noble Meketre who was chancellor and chief steward during the reign of Mentuhotep II and Mentuhotep III, during the Eleventh Dynasty.

== Discovery and excavation ==
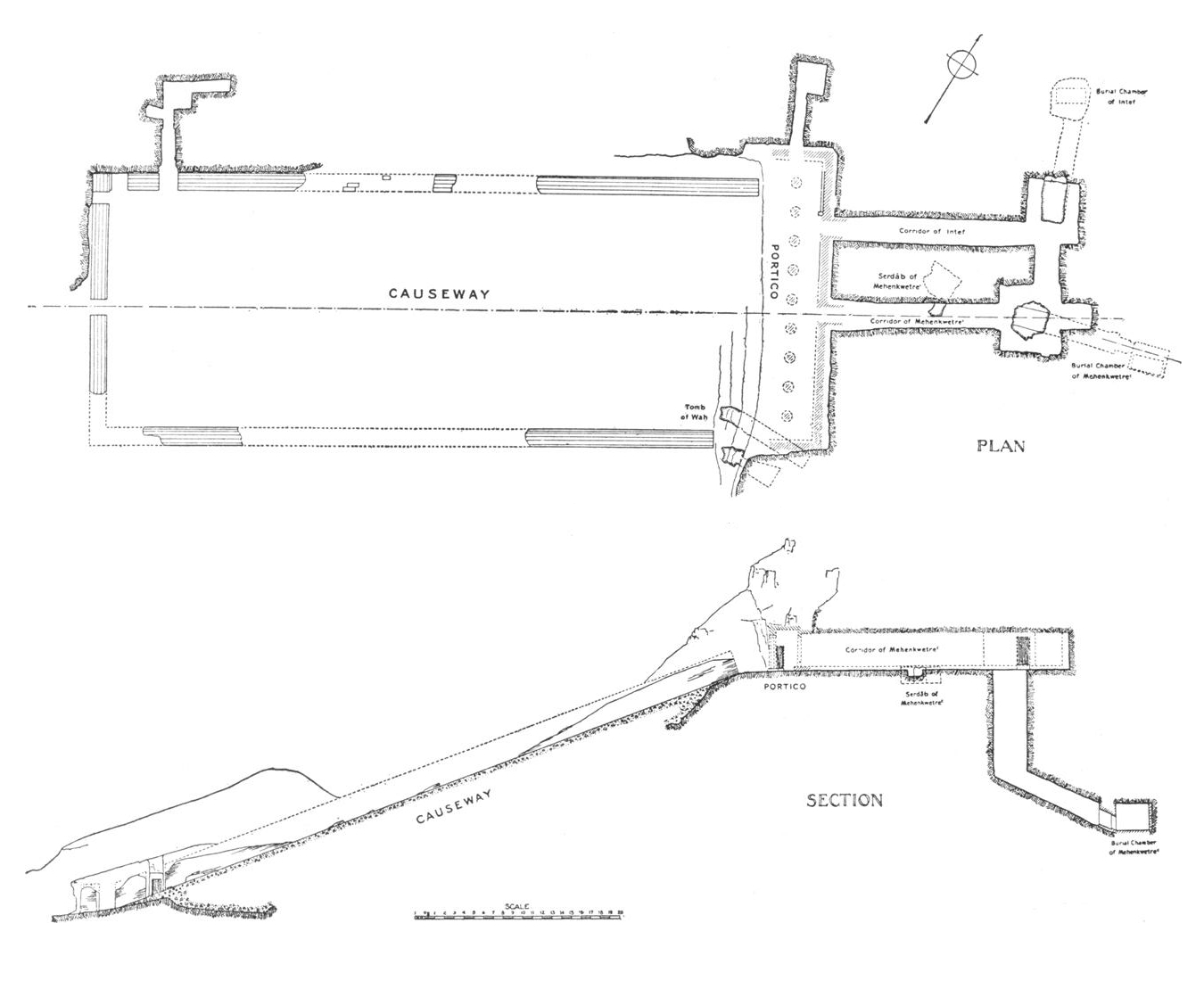
Floor plan and section of the tomb.

The tomb was discovered in 1895 by Georges Daressy. It had been plundered in ancient times, but when Herbert Winlock excavated it in 1920, an undisturbed room containing several models was discovered. These models cover daily life at the estate of the Vizier Meketre.

N5 m D39 k t Z2
Meketre
in hieroglyphs
Era: New Kingdom
(1550–1069 BC)

== Models ==
This tomb contained many models:

- In the Cairo Museum: two canoes with draw-net, Boat with paddles, and Meketre and son Antef under canopy, sailing-boat with Meketre under canopy, Kitchen tender, Sailing-boat with wicker cabin, Sailing-boat, house in garden, Carpenter's shop, Spinning and weaving, Inspection of cattle, Female offering-bringer with drink.
- In the Metropolitan Museum of Art, New York: rowing-boat with musicians and kitchen tender, Rowing-boat, Sailing boat with Meketre and son Antef under canopy, Boat with paddles, Boat with paddles, men harpooning fish, and Meketre and son Antef seated on deck, Female offering-bringer with food, Four male and female offering bringers in procession, Cattle in stable, Slaughterhouse, Granary, Brewers and Bakers, House in garden.
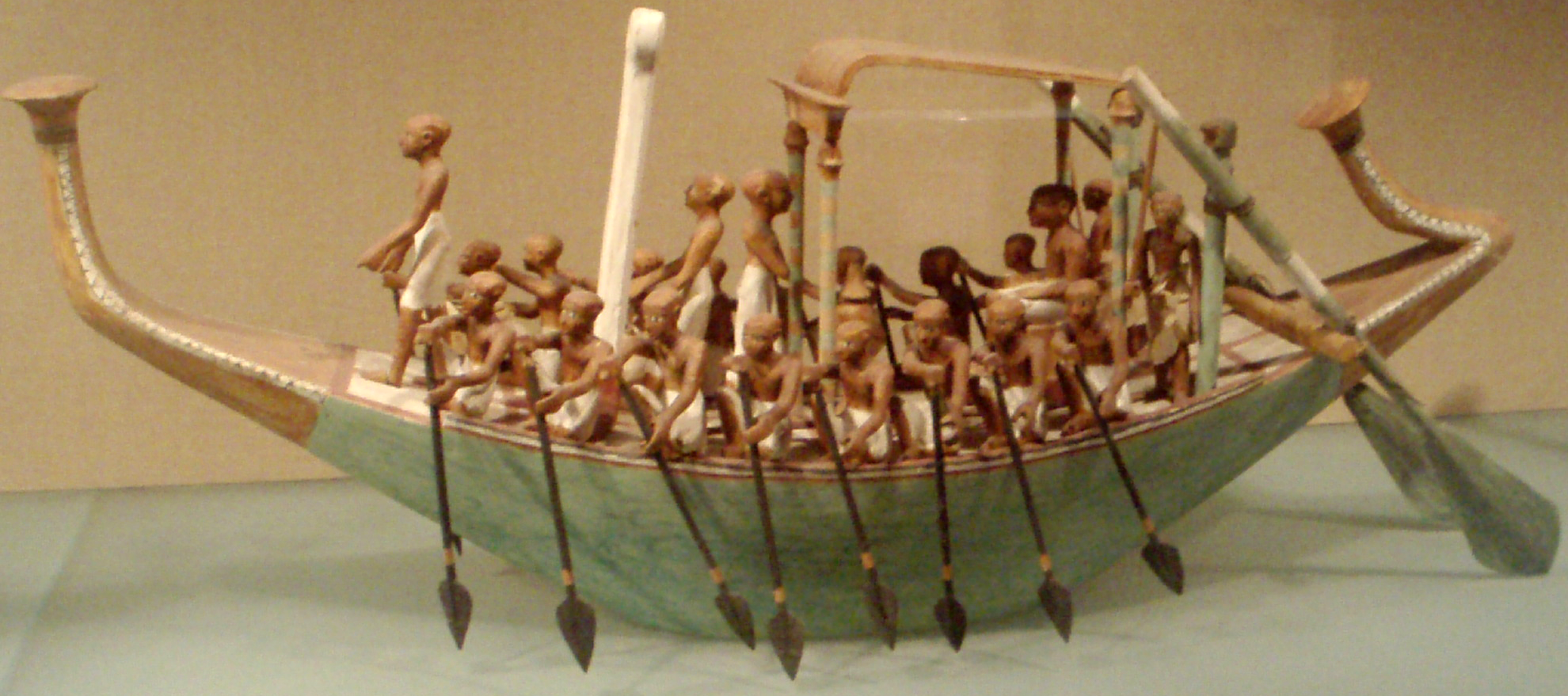
A model of a paddling funerary boat, painted and gessoed wood, originally from Thebes from TT280

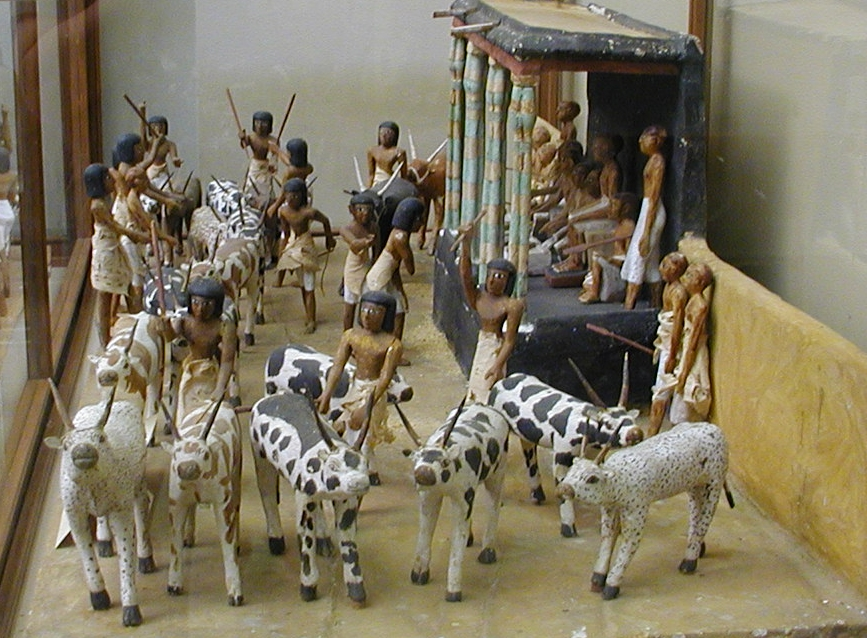
View from the cattle census

== Bibliography ==
- Winlock, Herbert E. (1920). "The Egyptian Expedition 1918-1920: II. Excavations at Thebes 1919-20". The Metropolitan Museum of Art Bulletin. 15 (12): 12–32. doi:10.2307/3253881.
- Porter, Bertha; Moss, Rosalind; Burney, Ethel W. (1960). Topographical Bibliography of Ancient Egyptian Hieroglyphic Text, Reliefs, and Paintings, Volume I: The Theban Necropolis, Part 1: Private Tombs (PDF) (2 ed.). Oxford: Clarendon Press. ISBN 9780900416156.
- Arnold, Dorothea (1991). "Amenemhat I and the Early Twelfth Dynasty at Thebes". The Metropolitan Museum of Art Bulletin. 26: 5–48.
- Slinger, Katherine (2022). Tomb Families: Private Tomb Distribution in the New Kingdom Theban Necropolis. Oxford: Archaeopress Publishing Ltd. ISBN 9781803270364.
- Willems, Harco (2022). "Egypt's Middle Kingdom: A View from Within". In Karen Radner; Nadine Moeller; D. T. Potts (eds.). The Oxford History of the Ancient Near East, Volume II: From the End of the Third Millennium BC to the Fall of Babylon. Oxford: Oxford University Press. pp. 656–727. doi:10.1093/oso/9780190687571.003.0019. ISBN 9780190687571.

== See also ==
- List of Theban tombs
