= Wooden tomb model =

Type of ancient Egyptian grave goods

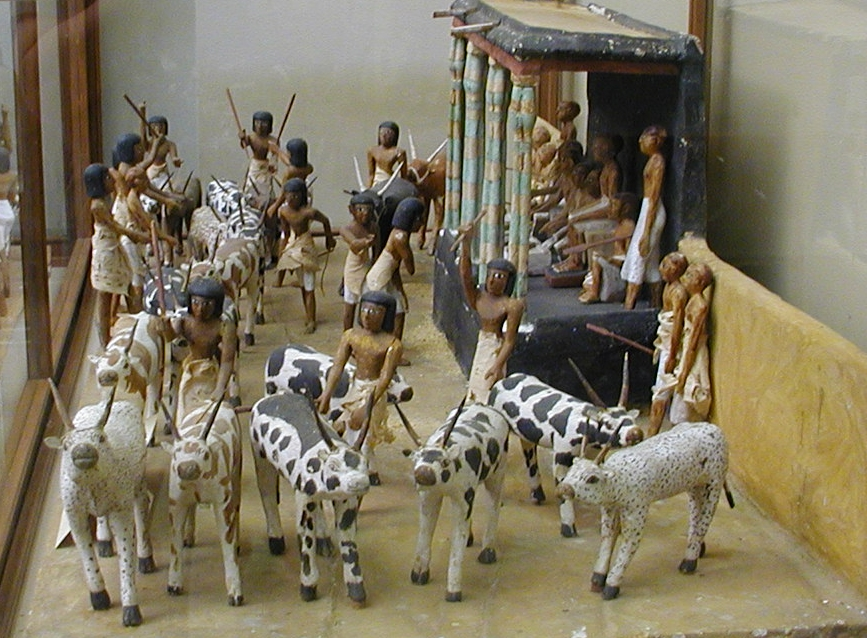
Model showing Meketre overseeing the counting of his cattle.

Wooden tomb models were deposited as grave goods in the tombs and burial shafts throughout early Egyptian History, most notably in the Middle Kingdom of Egypt. They included a wide variety of wooden figurines and scenes, such as boats, granaries, baking and brewing scenes and butchery scenes.

These models served as ways to preserve the action depicted for eternity in honor of the dead. The use of wood rather than other materials became popular in the First Intermediate Period. Over time the models of boats, in particular, went from life size to much smaller scale though they remained numerous, some boats being less than a meter in length and fleets at times being larger than 50 models.

== Predynastic, Early Dynastic and Old Kingdom ==
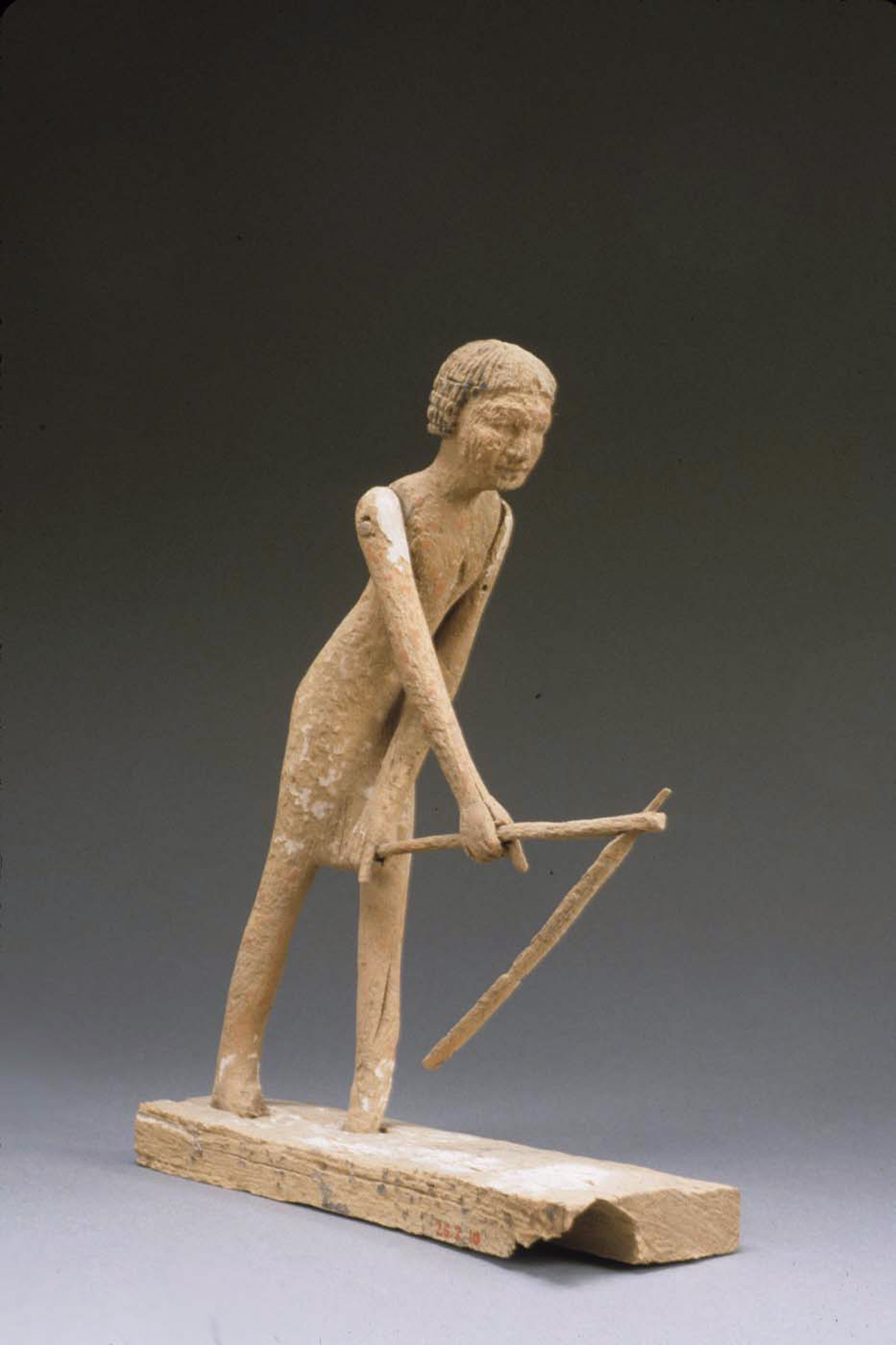
Example of a wooden funerary model that was found in the tomb of Tjeteti. The subject of the statue is believed to be a servant which is in line with other types of models of life at this time. This example comes from the 6th dynasty.

Pottery and ivory models from the Predynastic and Early Dynastic periods are rare, but have been found to include similar items and scenes to the later models such as granaries. There are some boats of the predynastic period, which are thought to have been modeled after boats used in swamps. Stone miniature containers were developed at this time and use for ritual purposes with an introduction of copper containers in the 6th Dynasty however, pottery remained popular. These types of jars would also go on to inspire wooden models of stone containers in the Middle Kingdom.

During the Old Kingdom, limestone models of single figures taking part in a variety of daily life activities such as farming, food preparation, brewing, animal butchering, and entertainment were produced. Wooden boat models also had become popular and have been found in elite burials. The funerary boats of the Old Kingdom were often life size or at times oversized, believed to be part of the funerary precession a mummy would take or an offering to the deceased. The Old Kingdom introduced square shaped river boats into the corpus. The models are often buried outside of the tomb, in the serdab, or in statue niches within the tomb.

Towards the end of the 5th Dynasty was when the first wooden models came into production, though often alongside stone pieces. These wooden models were smaller than those of later periods and less decorative in style. An example of this type of model can be seen to the right. Following the reign of Pepi II, such models are increasingly found in elite burials and in greater numbers.

== First Intermediate Period and Middle Kingdom ==
The First Intermediate Period models usually consisted of two or more human figures attached to a base in a scene. These scenes can depict a variety of tasks including food production, crafting and other modes of specialized work though boats remained popular through this period as well.

Most funerary models that survive today are from the Middle Kingdom, where not only the number of models but the variety of the models increased. Boats continued to diversify with the introduction of a new type of curved river boat, as well as boats that modeled ceremonial boats relating to solar worship and funerary practices.

Models in the Middle Kingdom could be found in many areas of the burial such as the tomb chapel, floor niches and shafts, or in the burial chamber. Models found in the burial chamber were oriented to the cardinal directions and coffin, and could be found both on top of the coffin and on the floor beside it. Boats would often come in pairs of rowing and sailing boats, representing both a trip north and south. Most of the models shared themes with scenes that are found on contemporary tomb chapel walls and coffins. For example, granaries are found depicted on southern walls of tomb chambers, particularly in the Old Kingdom, and as well as on the foot ends of Middle Kingdom coffins.

Some of the best known are the twenty-four wooden models that come from the tomb of Meketre (TT280), which are now found in the Egyptian Museum in Cairo and Metropolitan Museum of Art in New York City. The largest collection of models were found in Tomb 10A of Djehutynakht and his wife, also called Djehutynakht, at Dayr al-Barshā by the 1915 Harvard University-Boston Museum of Fine Arts excavation which included "some 58 model boats and nearly three dozen models of daily life." These models are now at the Boston Museum of Fine Arts.

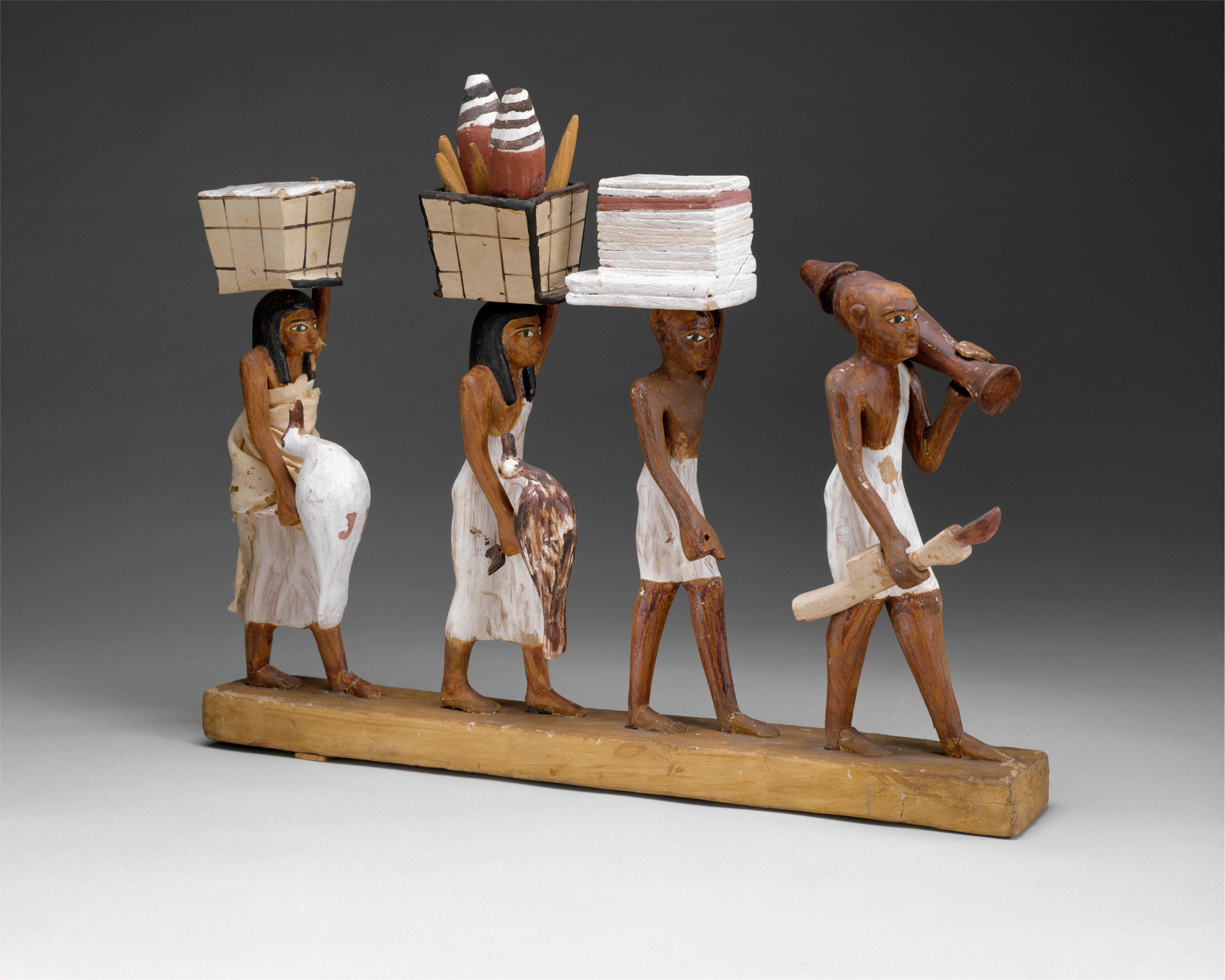
A procession of offerings found in the tomb of Meketre in the 12th dynasty. The people depicted are believed to possibly be his children carrying these goods to his tomb.

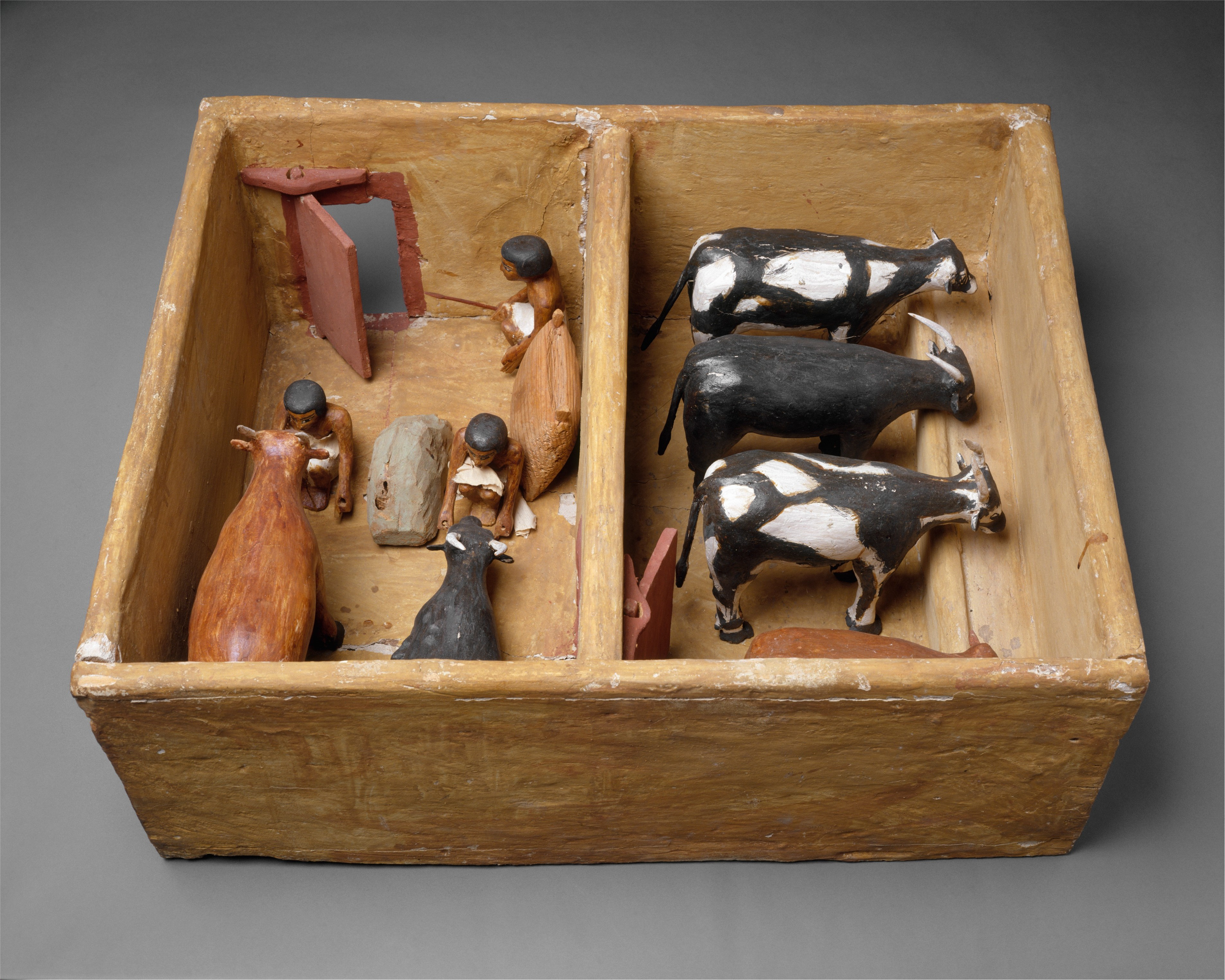
Another model from the tomb of Meketre. This model depicts the practice of fattening up cattle before slaughter. In this model two workers are feeding the animals, one of which is too fat to stand, all of this is being watched by an overseer who is holding a baton.

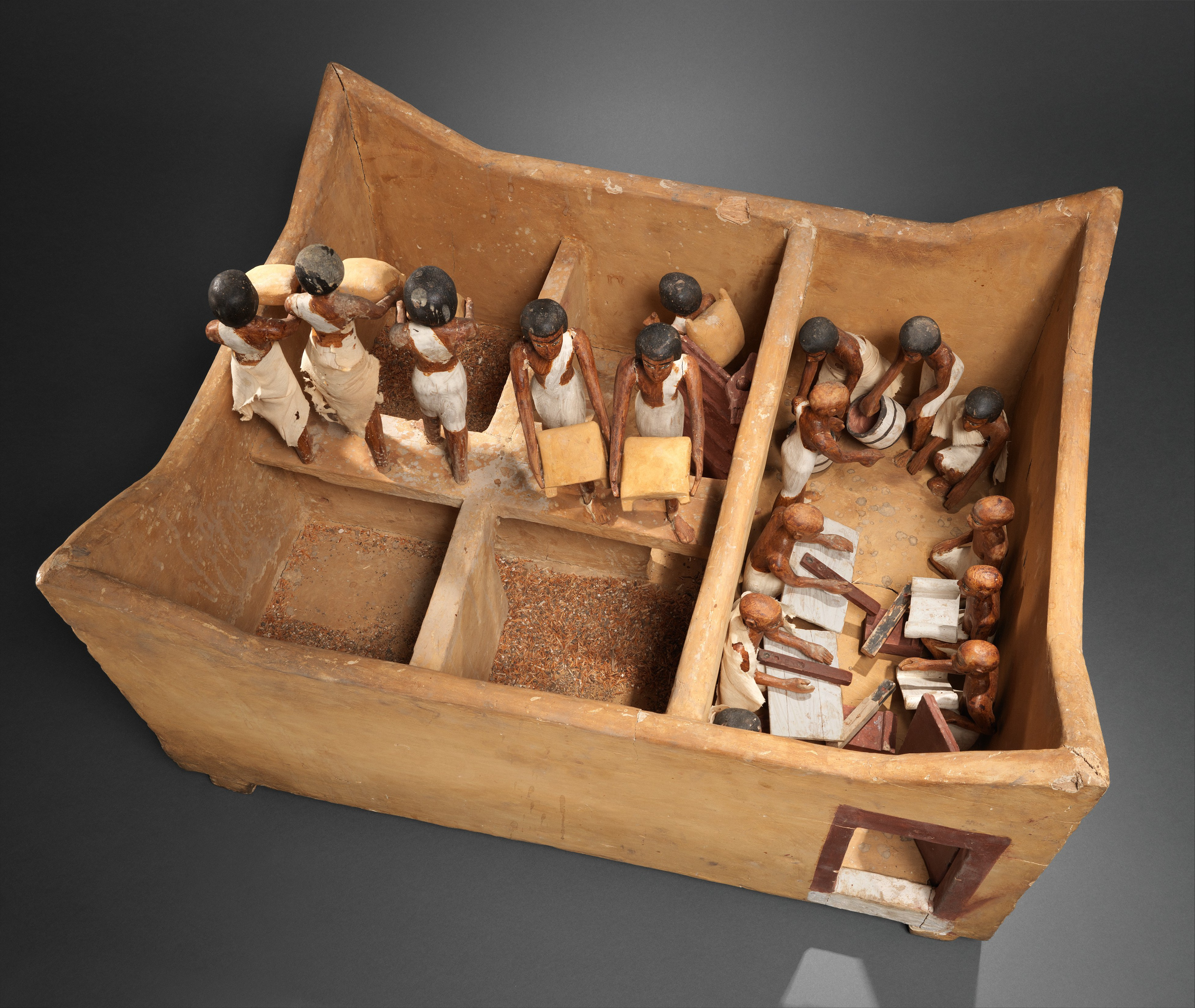
Another model from the tomb of Meketre, depicting a granary. This model contains several workers counting the grain as others pour grain into the storage areas. The accountants write on scrolls of papyrus and wooden writing boards. The corners of the building are peaked which is believed to prevent rodent infestation and discourage thieves.

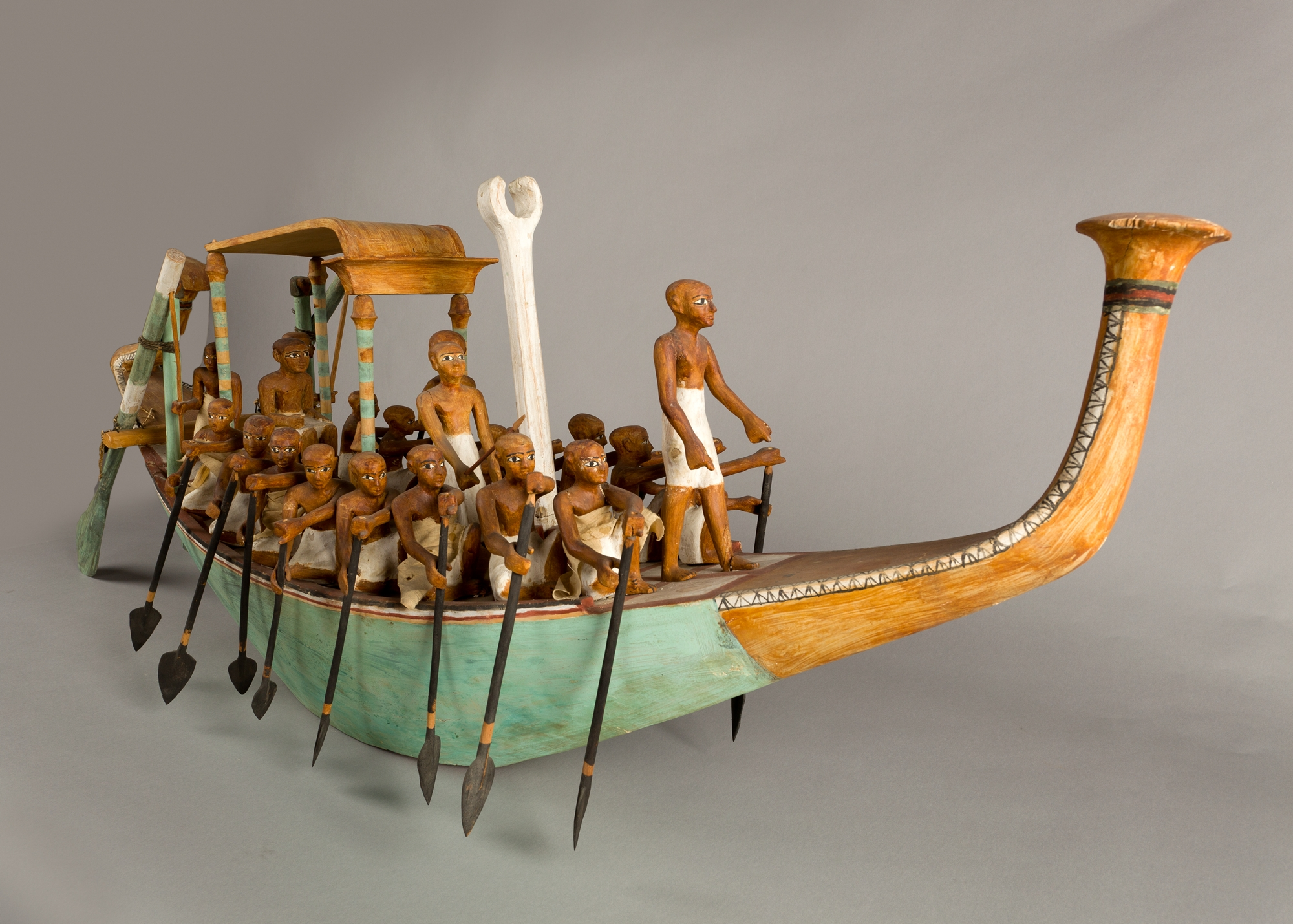
One of many boats found in the tomb of Meketre, this paddle boat depicts a religious ceremony. In this ceremony a statue of the deceased would be taken on boat to Abydos to the temple of Osiris. This became a more common practice from the Middle Kingdom onward.

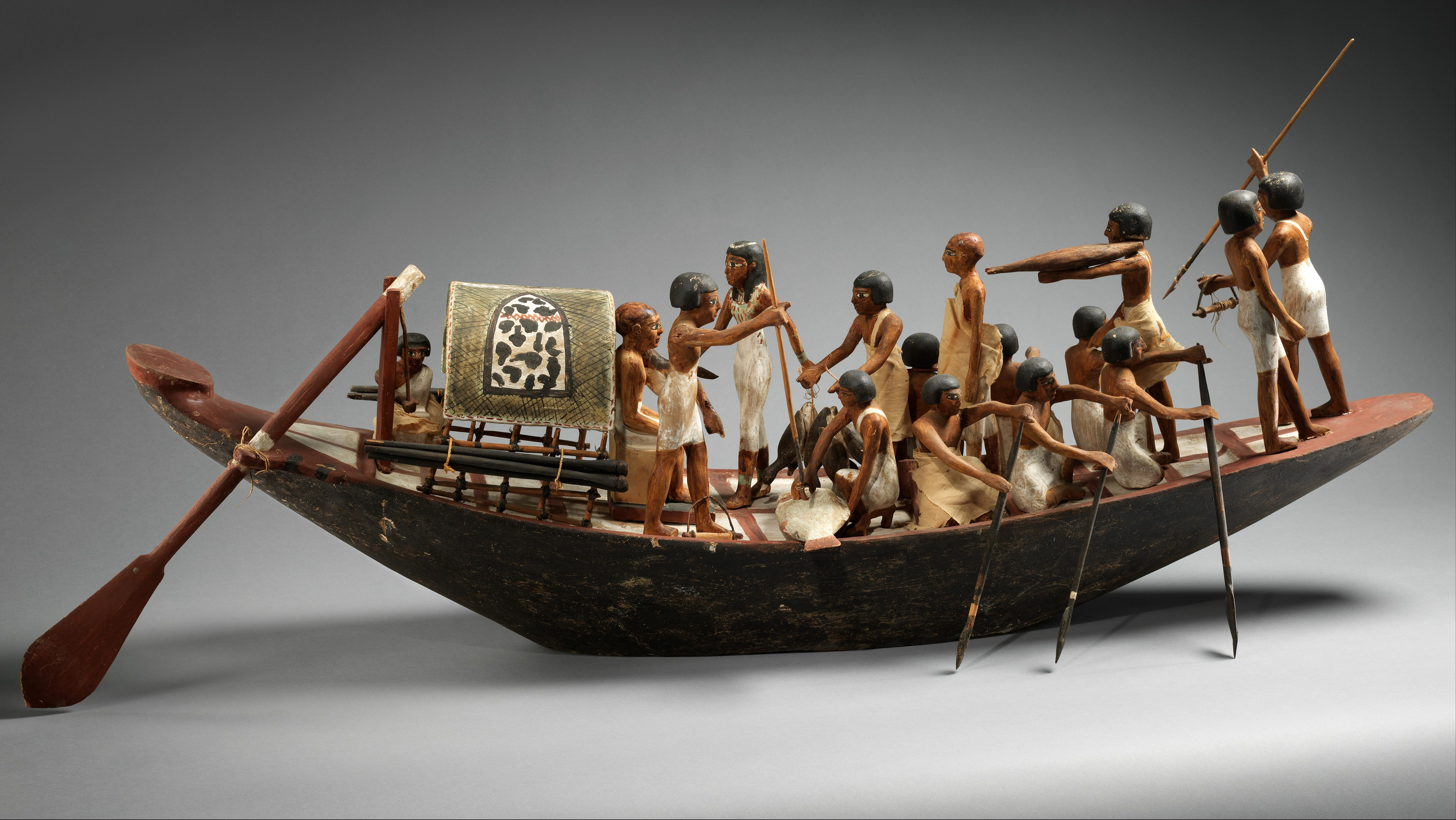
Another boat from the tomb of Meketre, this boat is believed to depict a fishing scene. A series of men assist in harpooning fish while others handle things that have already been caught.

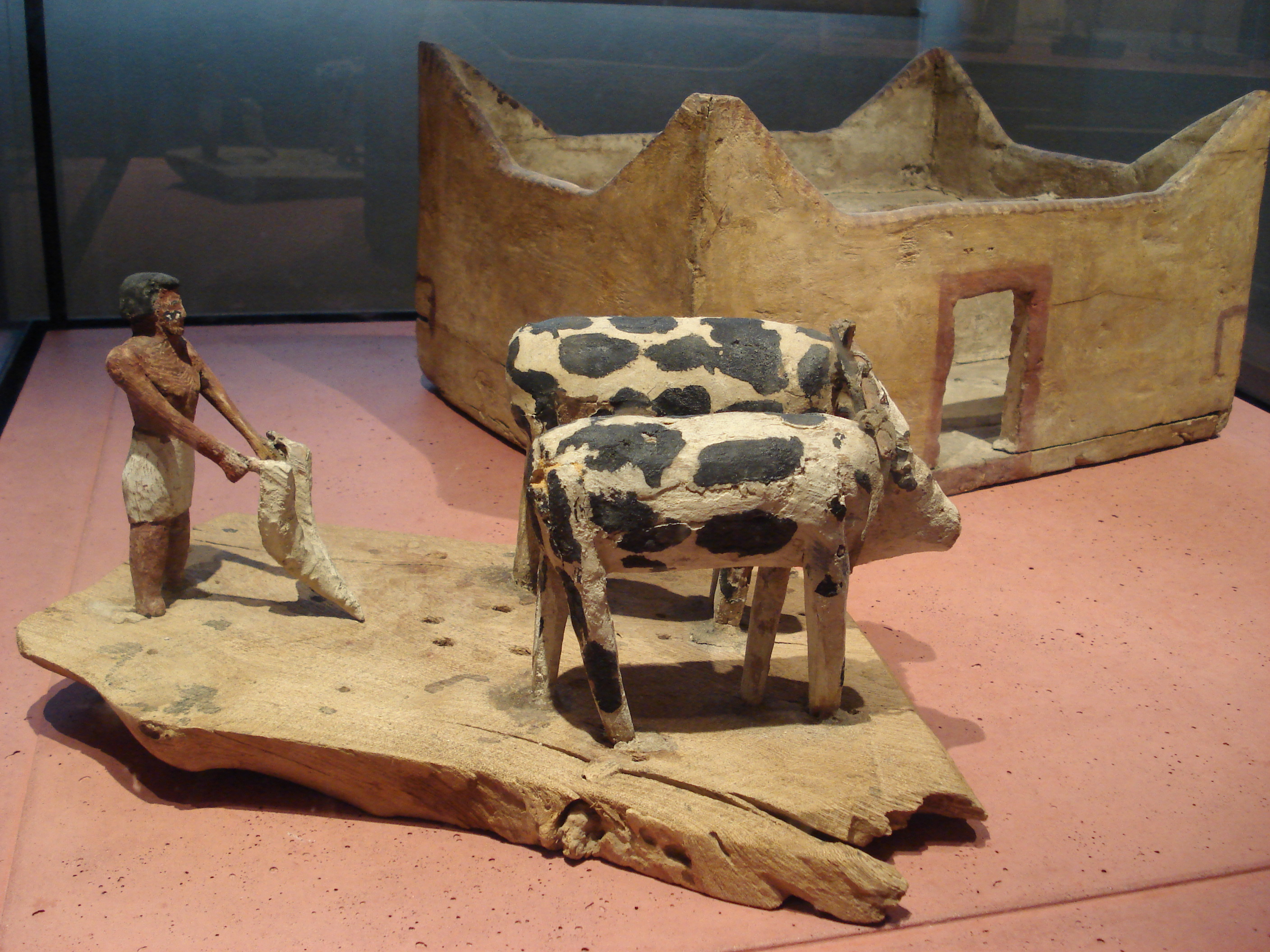
The exact dating for this model is unknown it is believed to have possibly been from the First Intermediate Period or the Middle Kingdom. The model consists of a farming scene.

== Late Middle Kingdom and New Kingdom ==
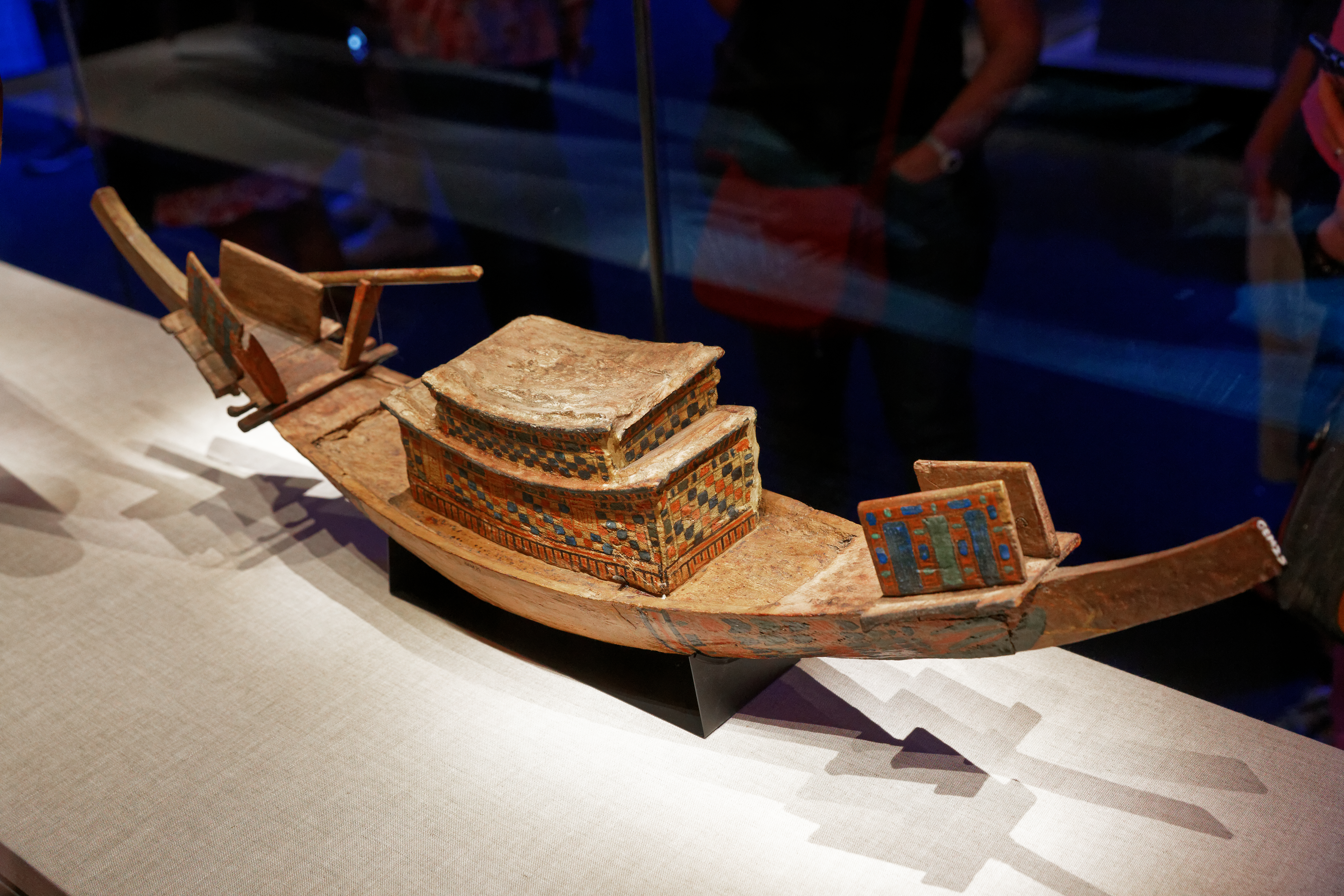
Boat model from the tomb of Tutankhamun

During the reign of Senusret III, the use of wooden models in tombs declines and are no longer found. However, frequently included in discussions of Middle Kingdom models are several model boats that have been found in New Kingdom royal burials, most notably the burial of Tutankhamun. Tutankhamun's flotilla included thirty-five boats. Other notable New Kingdom models are the boats of Queen Aahotep at Dra Abu el-Naga which includes one made of gold with silver figures and another made entirely of silver.
