= Rolf Kreienberg =

German gynaecologist and obstetrician (1946–2021)

Professor Dr. med. Rolf Kreienberg
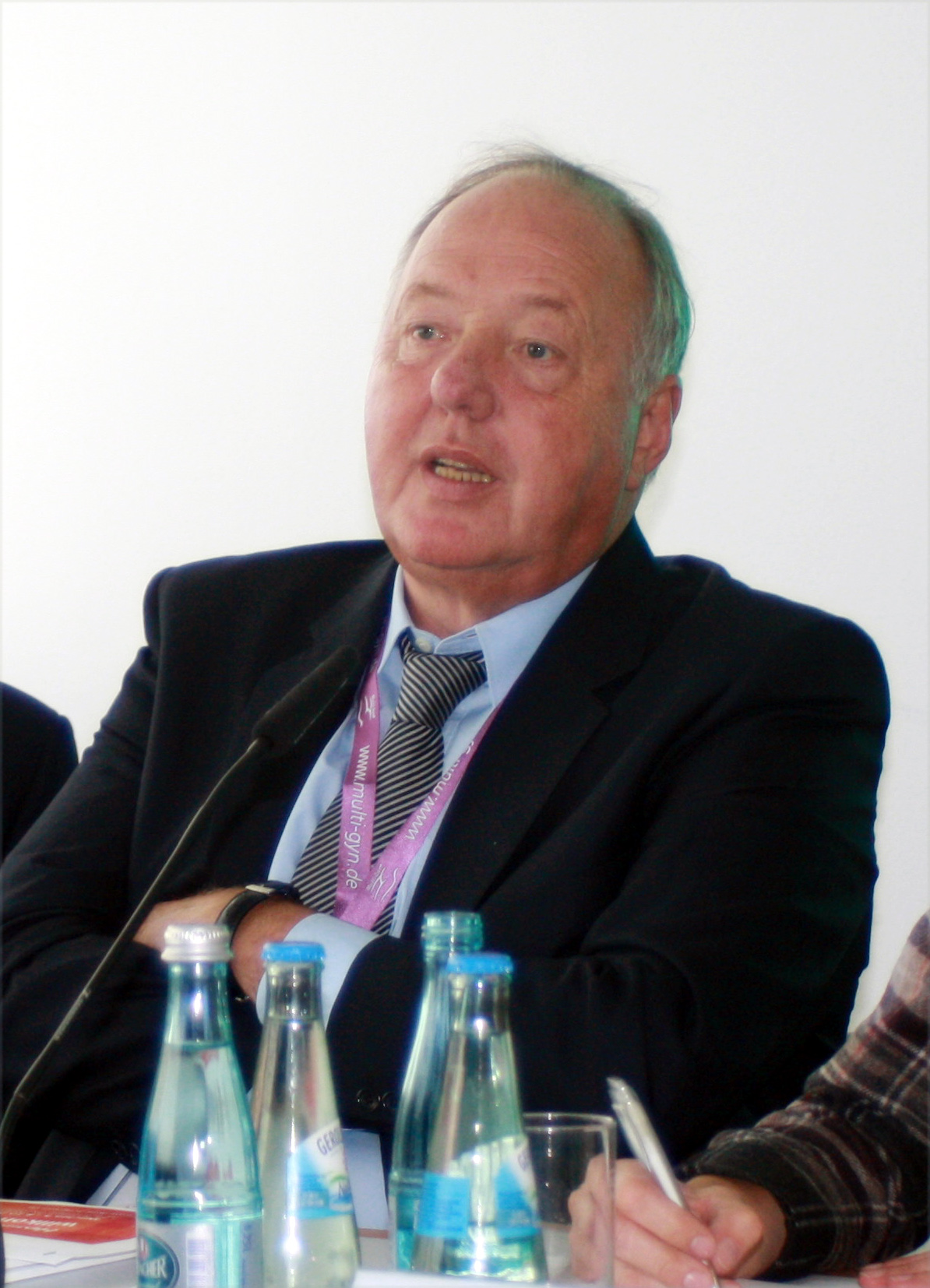
- Rolf Kreienberg (2010)
- Born: 27 October 1946; Kaiserslautern, French occupation zone
- Died: 10 May 2021 (aged 74); Mainz, Germany
- Education: University of Mainz, University of Vienna
- Occupations: gynaecologist, obstetrician
- Medical career
- Institutions: University of Mainz, University of Ulm
- Awards: Johann-Georg-Zimmermann Award, Karl-Heinrich-Bauer Award

Rolf Kreienberg (27 October 1946 – 10 May 2021) was a German gynaecologist and obstetrician.

== Life ==
From 1966 to 1971, Kreienberg studied medicine at the universities of Mainz, Germany and Vienna, Austria. After his preliminary examination he temporarily stayed at the University of Vienna, Austria. In 1971, he passed the state medical examination in Mainz and completed his doctoral thesis in 1972, earning his license to practice medicine in 1973.

From 1973 to 1974, he did his military service as a surgeon sergeant in the German marine corps. His next station was at the Institute for Anesthesiology in Mainz where he worked as a research fellow. In 1975, he started in the Department of Gynecology, University of Mainz under Professor Volker Friedberg. In 1981, he was awarded board certification in gynecology. He completed his post-doctoral thesis in 1983 and was appointed managing senior resident and staff manager at the Mainz University Medical Center in 1984. One year later, he was given a life-time full professorship (C2 grade). From 1988 to 1989, Kreienberg was acting director of the Mainz University Medical Center.

In 1992, he accepted an appointment as chair of gynecology in Ulm. Up to his retirement in 2012, he had served as medical director of the Department of Obstetrics and Gynaecology at the University of Ulm Medical Centre. From 2000 to 2002, he was president of the German Cancer Society (DKG). He was transformational in forging the development of quality assurance processes in oncology and building a certification system whilst evolving evidence-based guidelines. In addition, he was founding member and board member of the German Working Group for Gynecological Oncology (AGO). From 2008 to 2010, he served as president of the German Society for Gynaecology and Obstetrics (DGGG) and organized their 58th Congress from 5 to 8 September 2010 in Munich according to the motto "Values, Knowledge, Change" (Werte, Wissen, Wandel). Furthermore, he was an associate editor of the journal Onkologie – International Journal of Cancer Research and Treatment, co-publisher of Der Gynäkologe and member of the editorial board of Archives of Gynecology and Obstetrics.

The focus of his clinical and scientific work encompassed gynecological oncology, surgical techniques, chemotherapy and hormone therapy of breast cancer and gynecological tumors for which he earned interdisciplinary acclaim.

Kreienberg received the Johann-Georg-Zimmermann Award in 2010 and the Karl-Heinrich-Bauer Award in 2018.

In May 2012, he was elected to the AWMF (Arbeitsgemeinschaft der Wissenschaftlichen Medizinischen Fachgesellschaften) Board. He was Guideline Commission Chairman and had been AWMF President since 2015. He died suddenly and unexpectedly at age 74 on 10 May 2021. Just two days prior, he had just been re-elected as AWMF President by its Conference of Delegates.

== Memberships ==
- German Society for Gynaecology and Obstetrics (DGGG), vice president from 2006 to 2008, president since 2008.
- German Working Group for Gynecological Oncology (AGO), founding member and board member
- German Society for Plastic and Reconstructive Surgery
- Working Group for Reconstructive Surgical Procedures in Gynaecology (AWO)
- Working Group for Information Processing in Gynaecology and Obstetrics (AIG)
- Upper Rhine Society for Obstetrics and Gynaecology
- Middle Rhine Society for Obstetrics and Gynaecology
- International Gynecologic Society (IGCS)
- German Cancer Society (DKG), president from 2000 to 2002
- German National Academy of Sciences Leopoldina (since 2003)
- German Society for Senology (DGS), board member
- American Society of Clinical Oncology (ASCO)
- German Working Group for Gene Therapy (DAG-GT)
- Association of Leading Clinicians in Germany
- German University Association

== Publications ==
- Quantitative Untersuchungen an Operationspräparaten menschlicher Brustdrüsen und deren pathohistologische Beurteilung: statistische Studien am Einsendungsgut des Pathologischen Instituts der Universität Mainz aus der Zeit von 1960–1969. Dissertation. Johannes Gutenberg-Universität Mainz, 1972, DNB-IDN 730610683 (52 S.).
- Die Bedeutung von Tumormarkern in der gynäkologischen Onkologie und beim Mammakarzinom. Georg Thieme Verlag, Stuttgart 1984, ISBN 3-13-668801-5.
- Die Rolle der Anthrazykline in der Therapie des Mamma- und Ovarialkarzinoms (= Onkologie. Band 23. Suppl. 2). Karger Verlag, Basel 2000, ISBN 3-8055-7084-8.
- as ed.: Zervixkarzinom (= Der Onkologe. Band 7). Springer Verlag, Berlin 2001, ISSN 0947-8965, doi:10.1007/s007610170161.
- Brustkrebsrisiko: ererbt? umweltbedingt? beeinflussbar? Scultetus-Gesellschaft e. V., Ulm 2001, DNB-IDN 96745977X (18 S.).
- with V. Möbus, T. Volm and D. Alt: Management des Mammakarzinoms. 3rd Edition. Springer Verlag, Heidelberg 2006, ISBN 3-540-31747-3.
- with others: Neu-überarbeitete S3-Leitlinie für Diagnostik, Therapie und Nachsorge des Mammakarzinoms. Zuckschwerdt Verlag, München 2008, ISBN 978-3-88603-934-0.
- with Diethelm Wallwiener, Walter Jonat, Klaus Friese, Klaus Diedrich and Matthias W. Beckmann (Hrsg.): Atlas der gynäkologischen Operationen. Georg Thieme, 2008, ISBN 978-3-13-357007-7.
- Management des Ovarialkarzinoms. Springer Verlag, Heidelberg 2009, ISBN 978-3-540-41987-7, doi:10.1007/978-3-540-68857-0.
