= Maschinelles Austauschformat für Bibliotheken =

Bibliographic data exchange format

The Maschinelles Austauschformat für Bibliotheken or MAB (literally translating as "machine data exchange format for libraries") is a bibliographic data exchange format.

MAB was commonly used as an exchange format for metadata especially in German-speaking countries. Internationally, a comparable widespread exchange format today is MARC.

== Overview ==
MAB was mostly used in conjunction with the Regeln für die alphabetische Katalogisierung (RAK). The origins of MAB trace back to 1973, when a national exchange format was initiated in Germany under the leadership of the Deutsche Nationalbibliothek (DNB) together with the Arbeitsstelle für Bibliothekstechnik (ABT). A comprehensive revision of MAB led to the new format version MAB2 in 1995 after two years of development work. Later, four supplements to MAB2 were published.

The DNB neither used MAB as a cataloging format nor internally as a working format, but only for data exchange with other libraries. The use of MAB in the German-speaking library sector has been replaced by a switch to MARC:

Since 2009, the DNB started to provide its bibliographic data and authority data also in MARC 21 format. With the introduction of the Gemeinsame Normdatei (GND) in April 2012 the delivery of authority data in MAB format by the DNB was discontinued. In June 2013, the delivery of data in MAB format was finally abandoned.

== Content and structure ==
Similar to its Anglo-American counterpart MARC, MAB consists of five sub-formats that characterize different types of data:

1. MAB format for bibliographic data (MAB-Titel)
2. MAB format for name authority data (MAB-PND)
3. MAB format for corporate bodies (MAB-GKD)
4. MAB format for subject headings (MAB-SWD)
5. MAB format for local data (MAB-Lokal)

The MAB format allows a finer granularity when marking bibliographical elements than MARC. The greater diversification can be absorbed by grouping similar elements. Elements that belong together are arranged hierarchically.

== Comparison with MARC ==
Although influenced by MARC, MAB does not represent a strictly congruent equivalent mapping compared to the MARC architecture, but shows some significant conceptual differences.

While the MARC formats follow a relatively strict sequence of record headers and secondary entries when recording a title, MAB allows elements that match each other to be arranged in segments.

The approach of the MAB is therefore more geared towards the linking of semantically related components than to the comparatively static structure of the MARC formats.

Another difference is the assignment between bibliographical elements and fields. While MARC may combine several bibliographical elements in fields or subfields, MAB generally only assigns one element to each field. For example, field 245 of the MARC bibliographic format records a subject title along with a parallel title, while MAB would define a separate field for the parallel title. Overall, MAB prefers a more finely granulated breakdown and then puts the individual components in a context. In MARC, information about a multi-volume work would possibly be summarized in one sentence, while MAB in this case forms several sentences that belong together (main clauses, sub-clauses and suffixes). These sentences are in a hierarchical relationship to one another.

Furthermore, the MAB format only allows a certain number of field repetitions. In MARC, on the other hand, the (often arbitrary) repetition of a field is possible using the field addition "repeatable".

== MAB in XML ==
An XML version of MAB2, named MABxml, exists since the end of 2003. This makes it possible to transport MAB data via XML-based exchange protocols such as OAI-PMH or SRU.

== See also ==
- Anglo-American Cataloguing Rules (AACR)
- Schlagwortkatalog
