= Schlagwortkatalog =

German library catalog

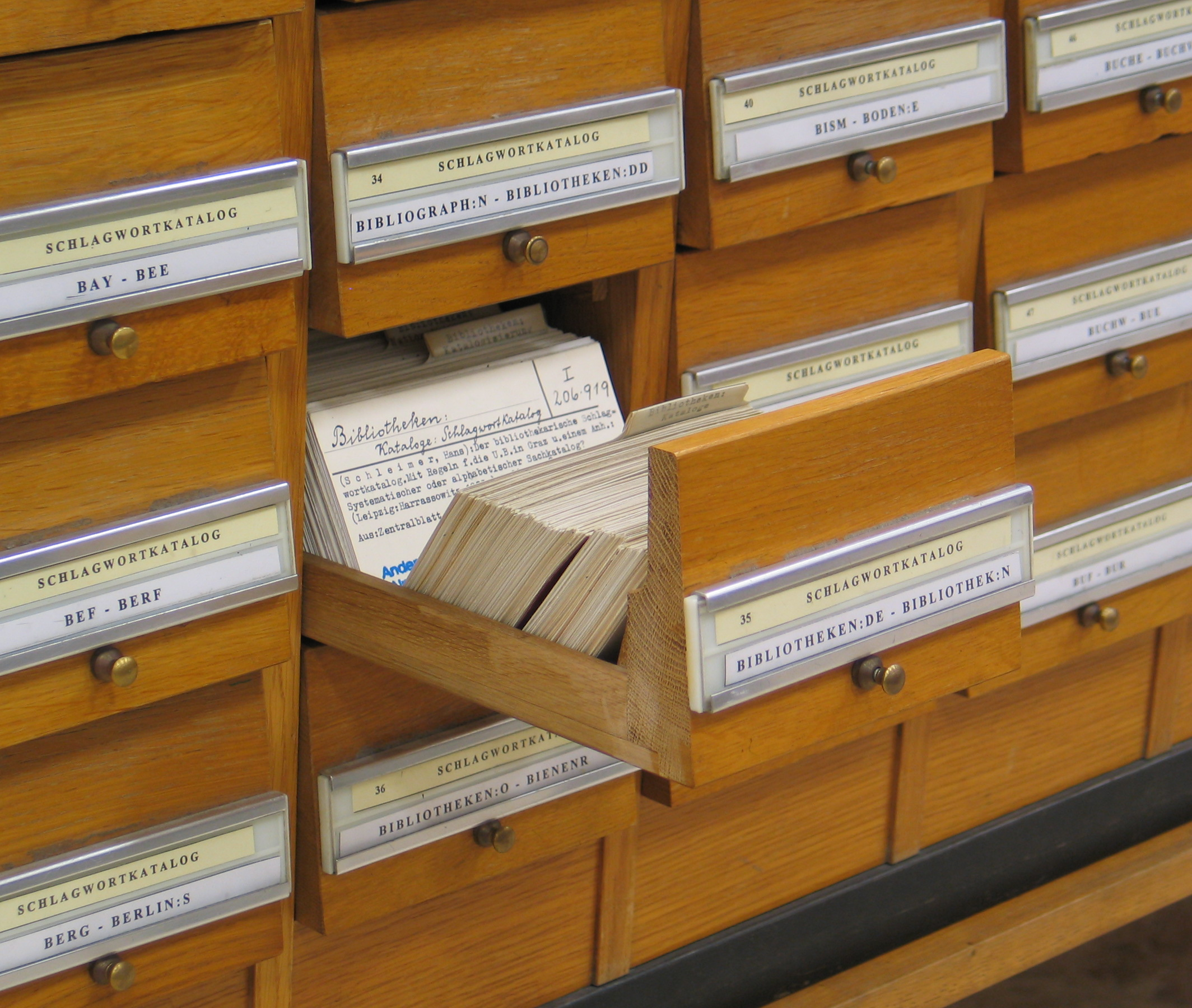
Schlagwortkatalog 1926–1993 in the University Library of Graz

Schlagwortkatalog or SWK (English: Keyword catalog) is a German word for a library catalog that lists the publications according to descriptor keywords and thus allows selective thematic searches for literature. A keyword is understood to be a natural language expression that reproduces the content of the publication as briefly but precisely as possible. Complex content can be described using a syntactical keyword chain, a combination of several individual keywords (example: Uganda / child / soldier / experience report). The sub-keywords are not only used for targeted research, but also allow catalog users to see whether the document found is relevant to their search. While earlier keyword catalogs were kept as an independent card catalog, the search option for keywords is integrated in modern OPACs.

== Rules for keyword cataloging ==
The Regeln für die Schlagwortkatalogisierung (English: Rules for subject headings cataloging) (RSWK), up to the third edition in 2016 still called Regeln für den Schlagwortkatalog (English: Rules for the subject headings catalog), are used in universal academic libraries and public libraries, and with restrictions also in special libraries in Germany, Austria, and in German-speaking parts of Switzerland and Italy (South Tyrol) for verbal subject cataloguing of bibliographical contents. In addition, there is an index of the keywords available, the Schlagwortnormdatei (SWD), which has been incorporated into the Gemeinsame Normdatei (GND) in 2012.

== See also ==
- Documentation
- Subject indexing (keywording)
- Authority file
- Systematics
- MAB-SWD
