= SWD =

SWD may refer to:

- Dragunov sniper rifle (Polish designation SWD)
- Schlagwortnormdatei (Subject Headings Authority File), a German indexing system
- Serial Wire Debug, an electrical interface
- Shift work sleep disorder (also known as Shift Work Disorder)
- Shortwave diathermy
- Southern Winds Airlines, ICAO code
- Southwest DeKalb High School, Georgia, US
- Sonic Wave Discs, Swervedriver band record label
- Spanish Water Dog
- Spotted wing drosophila, a fruit fly
- Stockton, Whatley, Davin & Co., financial company, Jacksonville, Florida, US
