= Gemeinsame Körperschaftsdatei =

German authority control

The Gemeinsame Körperschaftsdatei or GKD (translated as Corporate Bodies Authority File) is a German authority control for the organisation of corporation names (corporate bodies) from catalogues. It is used mainly for documentation in libraries. Like the Schlagwortnormdatei (SWD) (English: Subject Headings Authority File) and the Personennamendatei (PND) (English: Name Authority File), the GKD is looked after and updated by the German National Library (DNB), the Bavarian State Library, the Berlin State Library and, since 1997, the Austrian National Library, several library networks taking part. The responsible editor is the State Library in Berlin. The GKD was created in the 1970s from the catalogue data of the Zeitschriftendatenbank (ZDB). In April 2004, it contained more than 915,000 records.

Since April 2012 GKD, SWD and PND are part of the Gemeinsame Normdatei (GND) (English: Integrated Authority File).

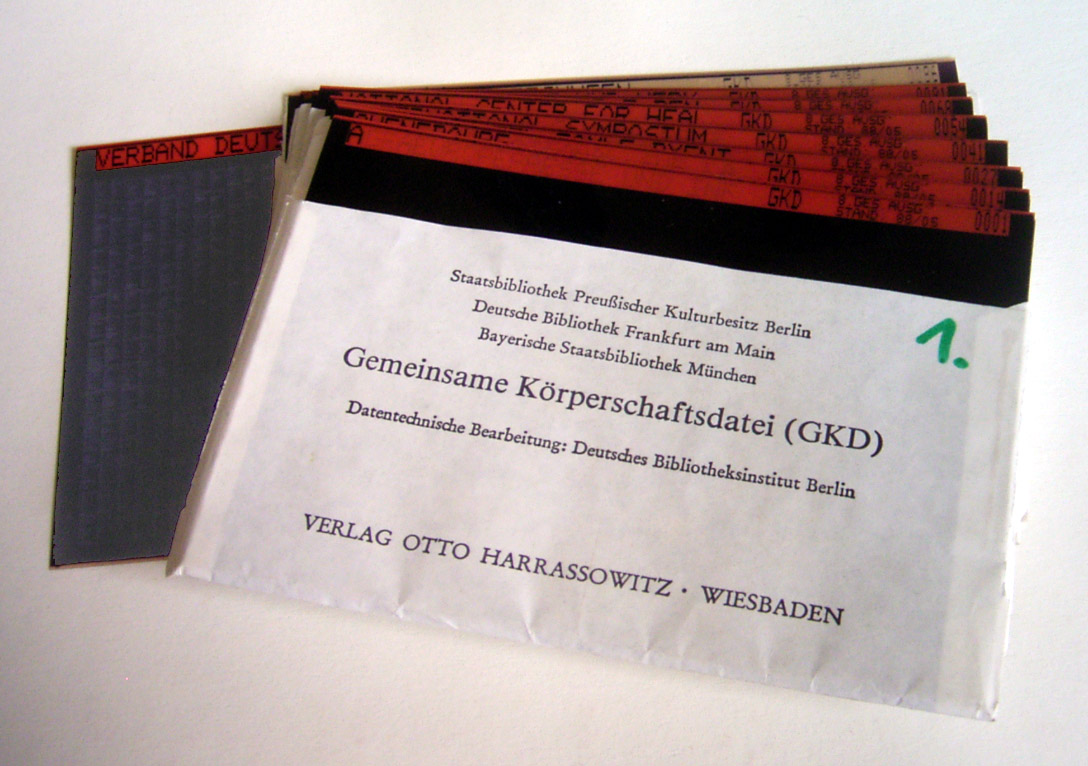
The GKD on microfiche

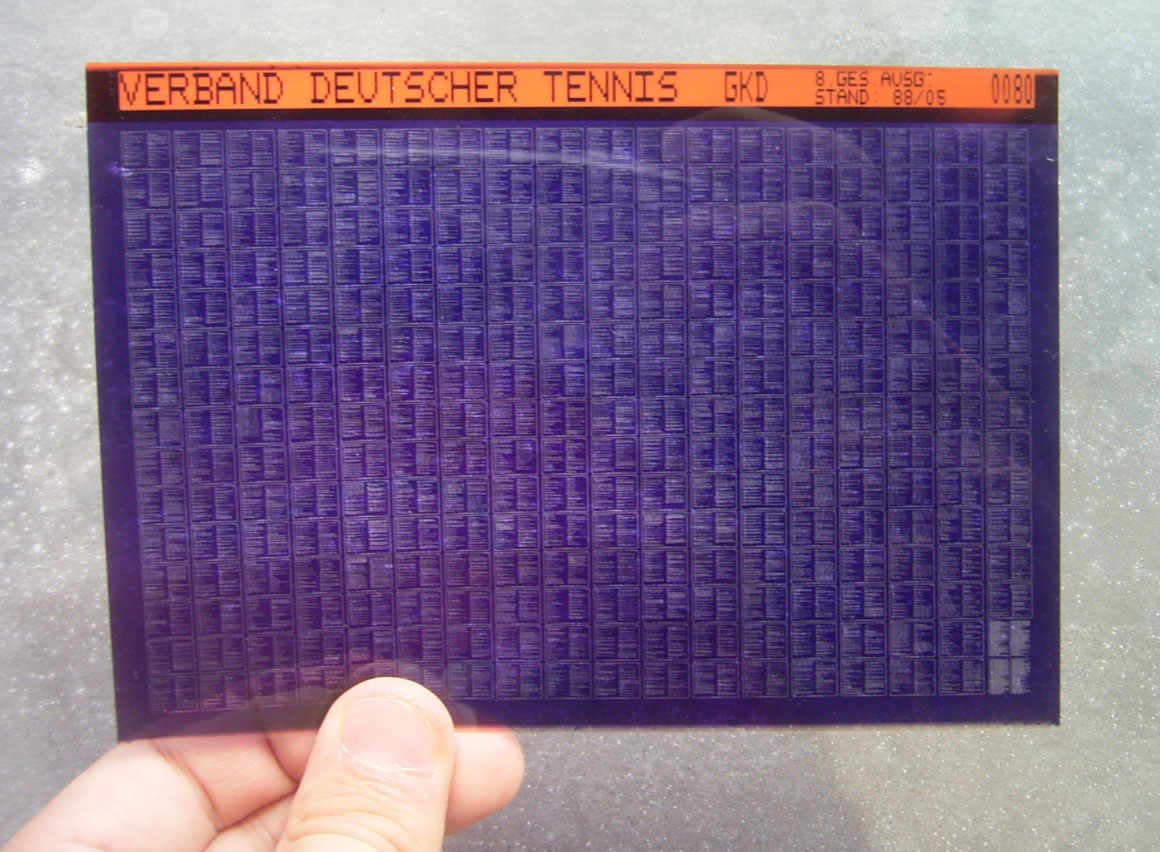
The GKD on microfiche

== Structure ==
As with the SWD and PND, the Regeln für die alphabetische Katalogisierung (RAK or RAK-WB) are used. They stipulate, amongst other things, what counts as a corporation. These include, inter alia, local authorities and associations such as firms and clubs, but also congresses and exhibitions.

In addition to names (index terms and synonyms) of individual corporations, GKD data files contain links to parent bodies as well as earlier and later names.

GKD records are uniquely identified by an ID number, the GKD number. The GKD number consists of digits, the last being a check digit, which can also be 'X' (for 10). The number ranges are divided into quotas by library network, so that, for newer records, it can be determined in which network they were created.

The GKD, like the PND and SWD, is available to information systems in libraries (usually library networks) and other areas via the DDB file on a standard CD-ROM or through a Z39.50 interface - but usually only for a fee. For access to authority records, there is a separate Maschinelles Austauschformat für Bibliotheken (MAB) for Corporate Bodies called MAB-GKD. Previously microfiches were used (see illustration).

The search for individual corporations enabled by the GKD is part of many catalogues.

A link to the name authorities of the Library of Congress is provided. A link to Wikipedia is still in the planning stage.

== Examples of a GKD file ==
ID Number (ID-Nummer)
2144828-0
Entry (Ansetzung)
Institut für Bibliothekswissenschaft <Berlin>
Remarks (Bemerkung)
Quelle: telM an DBL
Abbreviation (Abkürzung)
IfB
Corporation dates (Daten zur Körperschaft)
1. Oktober 1994
First reference (1. Verweisung)
Universität <Berlin, Humboldt-Universität> / Institut für Bibliothekswissenschaft
Second reference (2. Verweisung)
Universität <Berlin, Humboldt-Universität> / Philosophische Fakultät <1> / Institut für Bibliothekswissenschaft
Former name (Früherer Name) (Reference to its own record)
Institut für Bibliothekswissenschaft und Wissenschaftliche Information <Berlin>
State code (Ländercode)
XA-DE

The example is not given directly in internal PICA+ or MAB format.

== GKD references between data ==
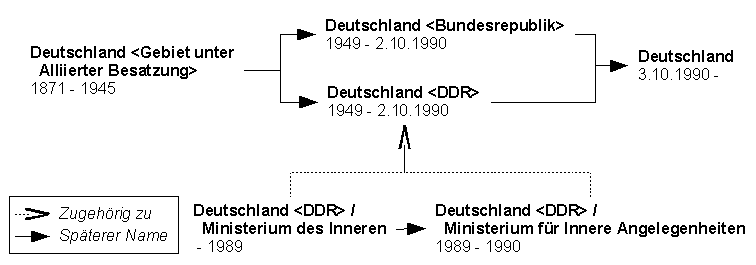
GKD records can refer to one another using "Earlier/later name" and "belonging to" fields. The following example contains an extract:
