= Zeitschriftendatenbank =

Central bibliographical database in Germany and Austria

The Zeitschriftendatenbank, or ZDB (translated as: German Union Catalogue of Serials), is the central bibliographical database for title and ownership records of ongoing collections in Germany and Austria, for example, from trade journals, magazines and newspapers. The ZDB holds records of almost all German scientific libraries and many other public libraries and is freely available on the Internet. The journal database is managed by the Staatsbibliothek zu Berlin (SBB) in cooperation with the Deutsche Nationalbibliothek (DNB), the German National Library, which is responsible for the technical system support and further development.

== Overview ==
The basic requirement for the inclusion of a title in the journal database is that it belongs to the genre of the continuous collective works like periodicals, serials or series issued in several parts (booklets, volumes) and which are not limited in the duration of publication (such as lexica). The spectrum includes not only printed evidence (print media), but also titles from electronic journals and microforms.

The database records which periodicals are available in the individual participating libraries and allows searching for magazine titles. The so-called inventory data record provides information about which volumes are available in which library. In contrast, the ZDB does not list any article title. (Note: See the bibliographical database "WorldCat".)

Due to its range of titles and inventory records, the ZDB is the backbone of the interlibrary loan system in Germany for the aforementioned types of literature. In addition to the holdings of German libraries, it also lists those from Austria and (to a limited extent) other European countries. As one of the world's largest databases of its kind, the ZDB comprises more than 1.9 million titles in all languages from 1500 up to the present day, and it contains over 17 million ownership records of around 3630 German and Austrian libraries for these titles.

Since June 2014, most of the metadata has been under the Creative Commons Zero (CC0 1.0) license and is therefore released for reuse.

In the 1970s, the former Gemeinsame Körperschaftsdatei (GKD) was created from the catalogue data of the ZDB. This was incorporated into the Gemeinsame Normdatei (GND) in April 2012.
