= Meketre =

Ancient Egyptian official

- Chancellor, High steward and Treasurer
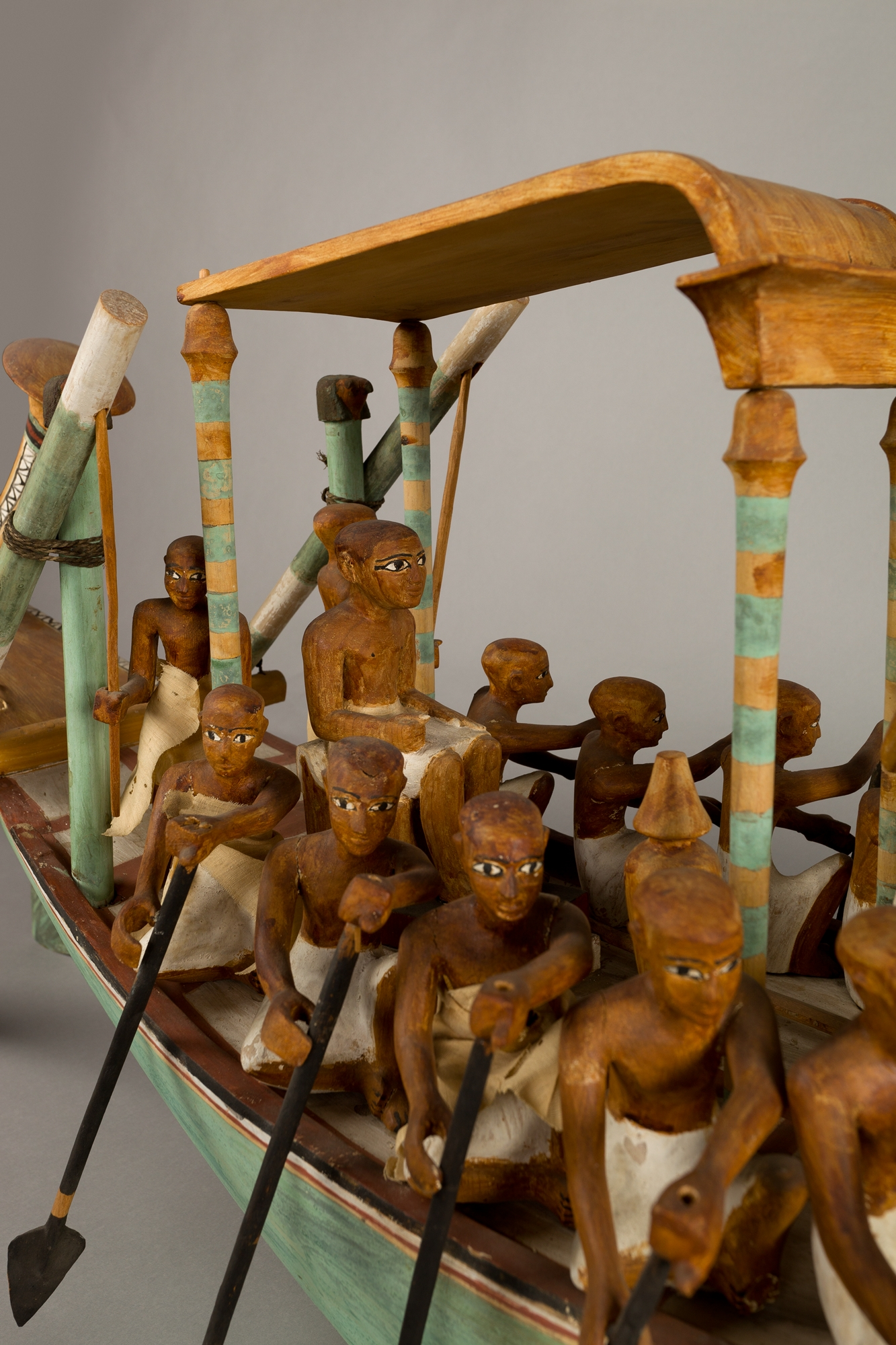
- Model of a paddling boat with a canopy and chair on it from the Tomb of Meketre
Egyptian name
ra m D37 k t Z2
- Tenure: c. 2000 BC
- Dynasty: 11th Dynasty
- Pharaoh: Mentuhotep II, Mentuhotep III, and Amenemhat I (possibly)
- Burial: TT280

Meketre (fl. c. 2000 BC) was a chancellor and high steward during the reign of Mentuhotep II, Mentuhotep III, and perhaps Amenemhat I, during the Middle Kingdom.

== Biography ==
Meketre is first attested in a rock inscription in the Wadi Shatt el-Rigala, bearing the simple title sealer. The inscription is dated to year 41 of king Mentuhotep II. On reliefs from the mortuary temple of the same king in Deir el-Bahari Meketre bears the title of chancellor and was evidently promoted in the meantime, succeeding Kheti. The same title was found on a statue in Meketre's tomb while on relief fragments in the tomb he held the main title of high steward.

== Tomb ==
The tomb TT280 is located in Sheikh Abd el-Qurna, part of the Theban Necropolis, and lies next to a large, unfinished royal tomb which was originally attributed to king Mentuhotep III and, after new research, to Amenemhat I. Therefore, Meketre most likely died under the latter king.

Meketre's tomb TT280 contained several wooden replicas, representing the daily activities and life in Ancient Egypt, together with figurines of ships and cattle were, miniature buildings and gardens. Selections of the replicas and other items from the tomb are on display at the Metropolitan Museum of Art in New York City. The other half of the wooden models are at the Egyptian Museum in Cairo.

== Gallery ==
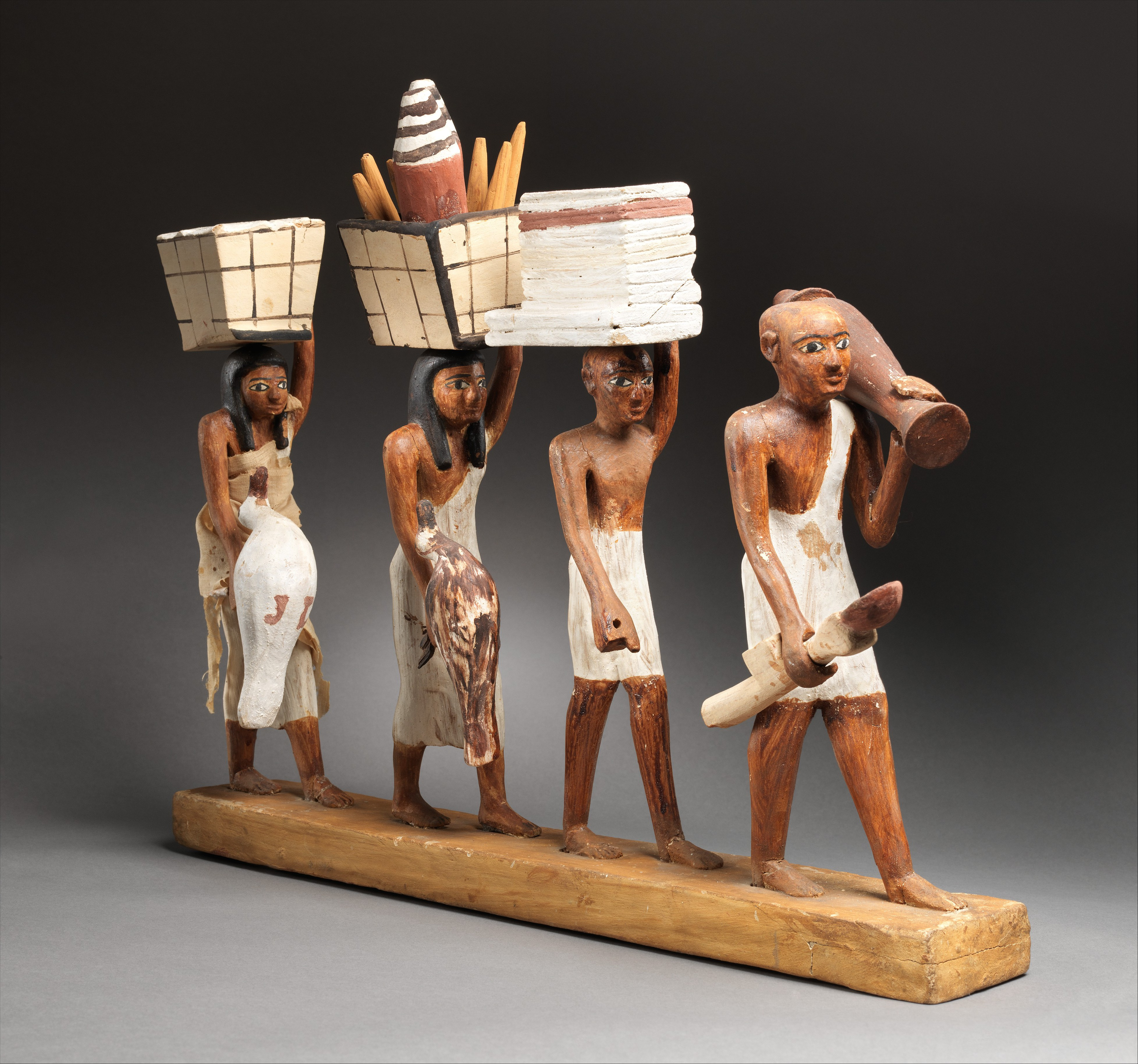
Procession of offerings

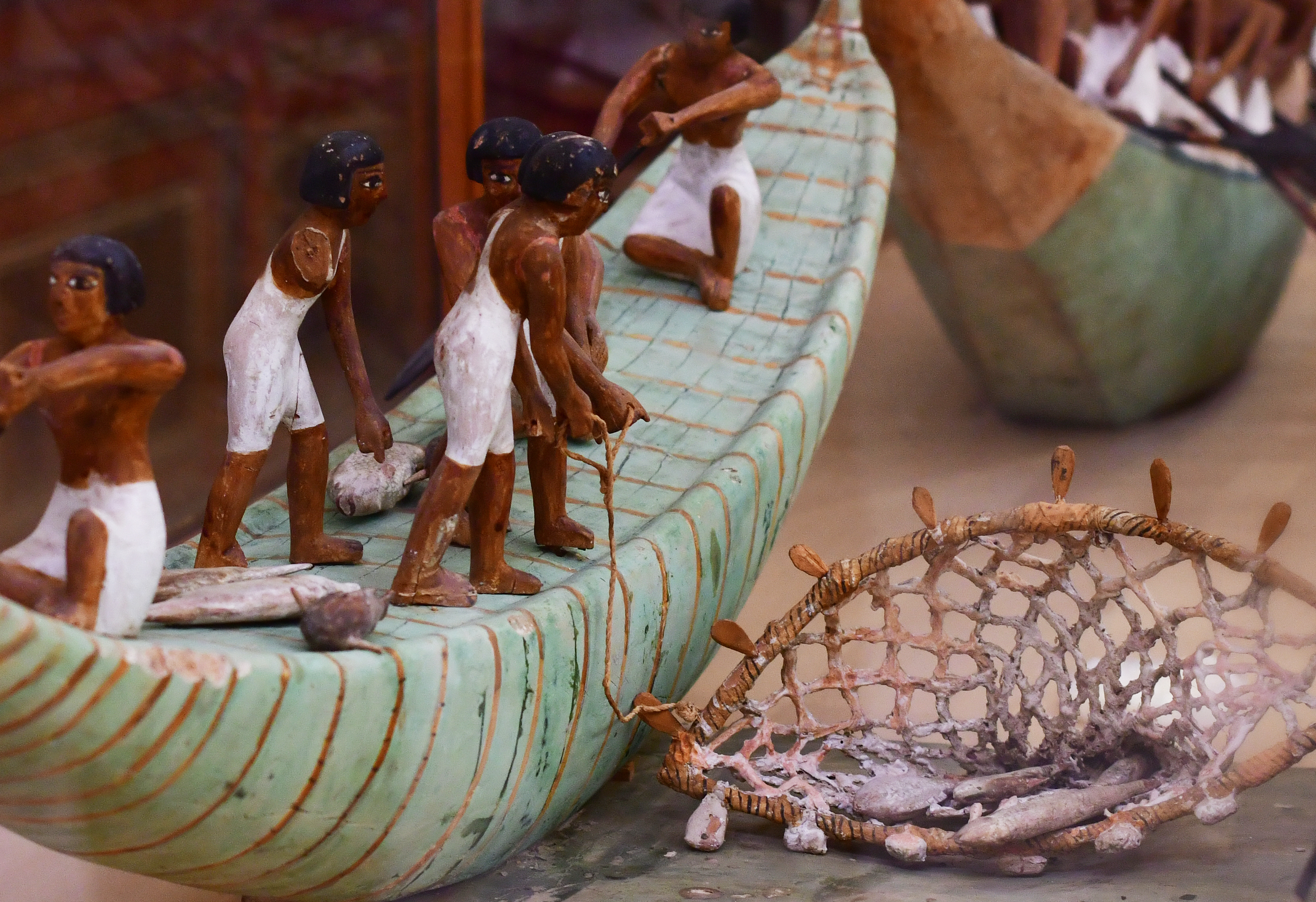
Fishing models from the Nile River

== Bibliography ==
- Dorothea Arnold: Amenemhet I and the Early Twelfth Dynasty at Thebes. In: Metropolitan Museum Journal. Vol. 26, 1991, ISSN 0077-8958, S. 5–48, online (PDF; 7,2 MB).
- H. E. Winlock: Models of Daily Life in Ancient Egypt. From the Tomb of Meket-Re at Thebes (= Publications of the Metropolitan Museum of Art. Egyptian Expedition. Vol. 18, ZDB-ID 86343-9). Published for the Metropolitan Museum of Art by Harvard University Press, Cambridge MA 1955.
