= Wolfgang Schadewaldt =

German classicist and translator (1900–1974)

- Born: 15 March 1900; Berlin, German Empire
- Died: 10 November 1974 (aged 74); Tübingen, West Germany
- Children: Dorothea Arnold

Academic background
- Education: Friedrich Wilhelm University

Wolfgang Schadewaldt (15 March 1900 in Berlin – 10 November 1974 in Tübingen) was a German classical philologist working mostly in the field of Greek philology and a translator. He also was a professor of University of Tübingen and University of Freiburg.

== Biography ==
The son of a Berlin doctor, Schadewaldt studied classical philology, archaeology, and German literature at the Friedrich Wilhelm University (now the Humboldt University of Berlin) under Ulrich von Wilamowitz-Moellendorff and Werner Jaeger. After his doctorate (1924) and Habilitation (1927), he was a Docent at the university. In 1928 he was appointed professor at the University of Königsberg. He moved in 1929 to the University of Freiburg, where as Dean in 1933 he was a supporter of the Rectorship of his friend Martin Heidegger and of Nazi policies in higher education. In 1934, however, he resigned as Dean and in the fall moved to the University of Leipzig as the successor to Erich Bethe. Schadewaldt was a co-editor of the philological journal Hermes from 1933 to 1944 and of the journal Die Antike, which was aimed at a broader public, from 1937 to 1944. In 1941 he returned to the University of Berlin, where he took up the chair of classical philology. From 1942, as a member of the interdisciplinary Mittwochsgesellschaft (Wednesday Society), he would have encountered figures active in the resistance to Hitler. In 1942 he was inducted into the Prussian Academy of Sciences. There he held various functions until 1950: he was a member of the Institute for Greek and Roman Antiquity and directed the Polybios-Lexicon, the Inscriptiones Graecae, and the Corpus Medicorum Graecorum. He was also a member of the commission for German and of the commission for the history of late antique religion, and founder and editor of the Goethe Dictionary. From 1950 to 1972 he taught at the University of Tübingen, from which he officially retired in 1968. He is buried in the Bergfriedhof in Tübingen. The Egyptologist Dorothea Arnold is his daughter.

== Scholarship ==
Schadewaldt is regarded as one of the most important twentieth-century German classical philologists as well as one of the most effective communicators of ancient Greek literature. Schadewaldt's published works cover all genres of ancient Greek poetry: epic, lyric, and drama as well as philosophy and historiography. His work on Homer marks a high point. In addition to countless separate publications, his analyses in all these areas are collected in his six volumes of Tübingen Lectures, delivered between 1950 and 1972.

Schadewaldt's influence is also felt in the form of his students, among whom are the early representatives of the Tübingen school of Platonic studies. This internationally recognized approach to Platonic interpretation was founded by Schadewaldt's students Hans Joachim Krämer and Konrad Gaiser, and subsequently advanced by Gaiser's successor Thomas A. Szlezák. Schadewaldt's students also include Wolfgang Kullmann and Hellmut Flashar, who studied with him in Berlin, and the ancient historian Alexander Demandt.

== Translations ==
Schadewaldt is known to a broader audience as translator of Homer's Iliad and Odyssey, which along with the renderings of Johann Heinrich Voss are regarded as the best German versions of the two epics. Unlike Voss, Schadewaldt opted not to employ the hexameter in his versions. He translated the Odyssey (1957) in prose; his posthumously published version of the Iliad (1975) employs free verse. In addition to Homer, Schadewaldt's translations include tragedies by Aeschylus and Sophocles, as well as the Carmina Burana.

== Publications ==
=== Monographs and collections ===
- Monolog und Selbstgeschpräch (1926)
- Iliasstudien (1938; 2d ed. 1943; 3d ed. 1966)
- Die Heimkehr des Odysseus (1946)
- Legende von Homer dem fahrenden Sänger (1942, 1959)
- Sophokles und das Leid (1948)
- Sappho. Welt und Dichtung. Dasein in der Liebe (1950)
- Griechische Sternsagen (1956)
- Hellas und Hesperien. Gesammelte Schriften zur Antike und zur neueren Literatur (1960)
- Goethe-Studien. Natur und Altertum (1963)
- Tübinger Vorlesungen. Vol. 1: Die Anfänge der Philosophie bei den Griechen, ed. by Ingeborg Schudoma, Frankfurt am Main, Suhrkamp, 1978
- Tübinger Vorlesungen. Vol. 2: Die Anfänge der Geschichtsschreibung bei den Griechen, ed. by Ingeborg Schudoma, Frankfurt am Main, Suhrkamp, 1982
- Tübinger Vorlesungen. Vol. 3: Die frühgriechische Lyrik, ed. by Ingeborg Schudoma, Frankfurt am Main, Suhrkamp, 1989
- Tübinger Vorlesungen. Vol. 4: Die griechische Tragödie, ed by Ingeborg Schudoma, Frankfurt am Main, Suhrkamp, 1991

== Translations ==
- Aristophanes: Die Frösche. Insel Verlag, Frankfurt am Main 1971 (Insel-Bücherei Nr. 962)
- Aristophanes: Lysistrata. Insel Verlag, Frankfurt am Main 1972 (Insel-Bücherei Nr. 967)
- Carmina Burana, 1953
- Homer: Odyssee, Hamburg, Rowohlt, 1958
- Homer: Ilias, Suhrkamp, Frankfurt am Main 1975
- Sophokles: Aias, Frankfurt am Main, Insel, 1993
- Sophokles: Antigone, Insel Verlag, Frankfurt am Main 1974
- Sophokles: Elektra, Insel Verlag, Frankfurt am Main und Leipzig 1994
- Sophokles: Die Frauen von Trachis, Insel Verlag, Frankfurt am Main und Leipzig 2000
- Sophokles: Ödipus auf Kolonos, Insel Verlag, Frankfurt am Main und Leipzig 1996
- Sophokles: Philoktet, Insel Verlag, Frankfurt am Main und Leipzig 1999
- Sternsagen. Die Mythologie der Sternbilder, Insel Verlag, Frankfurt am Main und Leipzig 2002

== Honors and awards ==
- 1934: Member of the Leipzig Academy of Sciences
- 1934: Member of the German Academy of Sciences Leopoldina
- 1942: Member of the Prussian Academy of Sciences
- 1946 German Academy of Sciences at Berlin
- 1958: Member of the Heidelberg Academy of Sciences
- 1962: Pour le Mérite for Sciences and Arts
- 1963: Reuchlin Prize
- 1964: Grand Merit Cross with Star of the Order of Merit of the Federal Republic of Germany
- 1965: Translation Prize of the German Academy for Language and Poetry
- 1972: Austrian Decoration for Science and Art

== See also ==
- Plato's unwritten doctrines, for Schadewaldt's students and the Tübingen School of Plato interpretation
