= Library of Congress Control Number =

Numbering system for catalog records

The Library of Congress Control Number (LCCN) is a serially based system of numbering cataloged records in the Library of Congress, in the United States. It is not related to the contents of any book, and should not be confused with Library of Congress Classification (LCC).

== History ==
The LCCN numbering system has been in use since 1898, at which time the initialism LCCN originally stood for Library of Congress Card Number. It has also been called the Library of Congress Catalog Card Number, among other names. The Library of Congress prepared cards of bibliographic information for its library catalog and would sell duplicate sets of the cards to other libraries for use in their catalogs. This is known as centralized cataloging. Each set of cards was given a serial number to help identify it.

Although most of the bibliographic information is now electronically created, stored, and shared with other libraries, there is still a need to identify each unique record, and the LCCN continues to perform that function.

Librarians from all over the world use this unique identifier in the process of cataloging most books which have been published in the United States. It helps them reach the correct cataloging data (known as a cataloging record), which the Library of Congress and third parties make available on the Web and through other media.

In February 2008, the Library of Congress created the LCCN Permalink service, providing a stable URL for all LCCNs that have not been suppressed. Although an item might have an assigned LCCN, it will not be associated with a record (i.e., not used in permalink, not useful in search tool) if it was removed from the collection or never added to it.

== Format ==
The two basic elements of an LCCN are a year and a serial number.

- The year has two digits for 1898 to 2000, and four digits beginning in 2001. The three ambiguous years (1898, 1899, and 1900) are distinguished by the size of the serial number. There are also some peculiarities in numbers beginning with a "7" because of an experiment applied between 1969 and 1972 which added a check digit.
- Serial numbers are six digits long and should include leading zeros. The leading zeros padding the number are a more recent addition to the format, so many older works will show less-full codes. The hyphen that is often seen separating the year and serial number is optional. More recently, the Library of Congress has instructed publishers not to include a hyphen.

== See also ==
- Accession number (library science)
- Authority control
- Books in the United States
- International Standard Book Number (ISBN)
- Library of Congress Linked Data Service
- Virtual International Authority File
