= Library of Congress Linked Data Service =

On-line system providing authority data

- Owner: Library of Congress
- Website: id.loc.gov
- Commercial: No
- Content license: Public domain
- Written in: Python

The LC Linked Data Service is an initiative of the Library of Congress that publishes authority data as linked data. It is commonly referred to by its URI: id.loc.gov.

The first offering of the LC Linked Data Service was the Library of Congress Subject Headings (LCSH) dataset, which was released in April 2009.

== Datasets ==
- Library of Congress Subject Headings (LCSH)
- Library of Congress Name Authority File (LCNAF)
- Library of Congress Classification—because LC Classification uses a different MARC format than LC Authorities, mapping LC Classification to MADS/RDF was more difficult than mapping LCSH or LCNAF.
- Library of Congress Thesaurus for Graphic Materials
- Various MARC codes
- Various preservation vocabularies

The Library of Congress offers users the opportunity to create their own datasets with library application profiles (APIs). Create your own datasets

=== Formats ===
The service presents data in MADS/RDF and SKOS where appropriate, but also uses its own ontology to describe classification resources and relationships more accurately. All records are available individually via content negotiation as XHTML/RDFa, RDF/XML, N-Triples, and JSON.

Each vocabulary is also available to download in its entirety. Id.loc.gov does not currently provide a SPARQL endpoint.

== Uses ==
All of LCSH are crosslinked with RAMEAU (Répertoire d’autorité-matière encyclopédique et alphabétique unifié), an authority file from the Bibliothèque nationale de France.

== Technical aspects ==
The id.loc.gov site initially used a fairly lightweight Python program to serve linked data.

See also

- Authority control
- BIBFRAME
- Library of Congress Control Number (LCCN)
- Personennamendatei (PND)
- Virtual International Authority File (VIAF)
