= Herbert Eustis Winlock =

American Egyptologist

- Born: February 1, 1884; Washington D.C.
- Died: January 26, 1950 (aged 65); Venice, Florida
- Occupation: Egyptologist
- Employer: Metropolitan Museum of Art

Herbert Eustis Winlock (February 1, 1884 – January 27, 1950) was an American Egyptologist and archaeologist, employed by the Metropolitan Museum of Art (the Met) for his entire career. Between 1906 and 1931 he took part in excavations at El-Lisht, Kharga Oasis and around Luxor, before serving as director of the Metropolitan Museum from 1932 to 1939.

== Life ==
Born in Washington, D.C., Winlock's father, William Crawford Winlock, was an assistant secretary at the Smithsonian Institution. Winlock studied Egyptology at Harvard, graduating in 1906. Mentored by Albert Lythgoe at Harvard, on graduating Winlock became the youngest member of the Metropolitan Museum's expedition to the royal necropolis at El-Lisht, 25 miles south of Cairo. After two years, he transferred to the Kharga Oasis 100 miles west of Luxor, where he helped restore a temple of the god Amun. In 1910, the Met's Egyptian Expedition gained a concession to dig at Malkata, near Luxor, (Thebes in ancient times), the site of the palace of Amenhotep III.

In 1911 Winlock began excavating the mortuary complex of the 11th Dynasty pharaoh Mentuhotep II (2010–1998 B.C.) at Deir el-Bahari in the Valley of the Kings, where he discovered tomb MMA 507 containing the bodies of sixty soldiers slain in battle and buried in linen shrouds decorated with the cartouche of Mentuhotep.

From 1914 Winlock was based in New York, working at the Metropolitan Museum, leaving to serve in the American Army from 1917 during World War I. He returned to Luxor in 1919 when the Met's Egyptian Expedition resumed full-scale activities in its Theban concession. On March 17, 1920, Winlock discovered the tomb of Mentuhotep II's prime minister Meketre, in which he found many wooden tomb models. During the 1920s, Winlock continued working at Deir el Bahari, where he discovered and restored the colossal statues of Hatshepshut, damaged in ancient times, which had once decorated her temple.

Winlock was instrumental in the design of the Dig House, close to the Valley of the Kings. Most often known as "the American House", it was headquarters and accommodation for Winlock and his team of archaeologists, several of whom were seconded to work on the tomb of Tutankhamun once it was discovered by Howard Carter in November 1922. Winlock was closely involved in that excavation and, as a friend of Carter's, helped mediate with the Egyptian authorities in Carter's absence when in 1924 the Egyptian Antiquities Service suspended the excavation. Winlock consistently dismissed the claims that a "curse" attached itself to those who visited the tomb or who were involved in the work on it.

In the wake of the Depression, funds for excavating in Egypt began to dry up, and the annual digs at Luxor ceased. In 1931 Winlock returned to New York, where he served as director of the Metropolitan Museum from 1932 until his retirement in 1939. His book Tutankhamun's Funeral, published in 1941 after his retirement, reviewed the 1907 discovery of funerary artifacts bearing Tutankhamun's name in the Valley of the Kings, close to where his tomb was later found. This find—in due course—provided Howard Carter with key clues in his search for that pharaoh's tomb.

=== Personal life ===
In 1912 Winlock married the artist Helen Chandler. They had two daughters: Frances, who died of tuberculosis in 1935 aged 21, and Barbara. During the 1920s excavating seasons, his family accompanied Winlock to Egypt, staying with him at the American House.

During the 1940s, Winlock suffered several years of declining health, dying in Venice, Florida, on January 27, 1950, a few days short of his sixty-sixth birthday.

== Legacy ==
Central to the great era of American museum-sponsored Egyptian excavations, Winlock's work contributed greatly to Egyptology's development, in particular, his reconstruction of the royal lineage of the Egyptian Middle Kingdom. Much of the Met's collection of Egyptian artifacts comes from his archaeological expeditions, particularly at Luxor, where he worked for several years on the excavations at the funerary temple of Hatshepshut.

During his career, Winlock received a number of honors. He accepted a number of honorary doctorates, including a LittD (hon.) from Yale, Princeton and Michigan universities, and an Art. D (hon.) from Harvard. He was director emeritus of the Metropolitan Museum of Art from his retirement in 1939 until his death. He was elected to the American Philosophical Society in 1939 and the American Academy of Arts and Sciences in 1944. He was also appointed a chevalier of the Belgian orders of Leopold and the Crown, and of the French Legion of Honor.

== Works ==
Winlock was a widely published writer on Egyptology. In addition to contributions to various journals, his main works include:

- The Tomb of Senebtisi at Lisht. New York: The Gilliss Press. 1916.
- Bas-reliefs from the Temple of Rameses I at Abydos. 1921.
- Materials used in the Embalming of Tūtánkh-Amūn. 1941.
- Excavations at Deir el Bahari, 1911–1931. 1942.
- The Slain Soldiers of Neb-hepet-Re' Mentu-hotep. 1945.
- The Rise and Fall of the Middle Kingdom at Thebes. 1947.
- Models of Daily Life in Ancient Egypt from the Tomb of Meket-Re at Thebes. 1955., (published posthumously).

== Notes ==
Cultural offices
Preceded by Edward Robinson	Director of the Metropolitan Museum of Art; 1932–1939	Succeeded by Francis Henry Taylor
