= Schlagwortnormdatei =

Controlled vocabulary index term system

The Schlagwortnormdatei or SWD (translated as Subject Headings Authority File) is a controlled vocabulary index term system used primarily for subject indexing in library catalogs. The SWD is managed by the German National Library (DNB) in cooperation with various library networks. The inclusion of keywords in the SWD is defined by Regeln für die Schlagwortkatalogisierung (RSWK) (English: Rules for the keyword catalogue). Similar authority systems in other languages include the Library of Congress Subject Headings (LCSH) and the Répertoire d’autorité-matière encyclopédique et alphabétique unifié (RAMEAU). Since April 2012 the SWD is part of the Gemeinsame Normdatei (GND) (English: Integrated Authority File).

== Scope ==
The SWD has about 600,000 descriptors and 700,000 non-descriptors (synonyms and quasi-synonyms) as well as synonymous descriptor chains with references to a descriptor. Its growth rate is about 5.5% per year. About three-quarters of the descriptors refer to individual concepts (language identifier, person, entity, title, ethnography etc.) and a quarter are abstract concepts. Linking using hierarchical (about 115,000) and associative (26,000) relations is not very dense, so the SWD cannot be viewed as a thesaurus (as of mid-2003).

The terms in the SWD are also arranged in a separate classification with nearly 500 classes in 36 main groups.

== Structure ==
The various terms are placed in a classification scheme and also contain references to sources, related terms, preferred term and to a lesser extent hierarchical links. But the SWD is probably not a complete thesaurus because of the low degree of linkage. The SWD is available online through the catalogue database ILTIS and is available for a fee as BIBLIODATA, together with the Personennamendatei (PND) (English: Name Authority File) and the Gemeinsame Körperschaftsdatei (GKD) (English: Corporate Bodies Authority File) on the standard data CD-ROM and the standard file TITAN. In both cases, the user interface of the SWD leaves much room for improvement. Instead of making SWD accessible as a user-friendly navigation tool, it assumes that users are familiar with SWD and its classification scheme and enter the appropriate descriptor in the correct form before running a search. Navigating the system or moving from one concept to another by means of hyperlinks is not possible. The strategy of the German Library to distribute authority records commercially makes the extended use of the SWD difficult, e.g. in other keyword systems.

For the exchange of authority records, there is a separate machine exchange format for libraries called MAB-SWD. The head official of the Southwest German Library Network (SWB) offers online access (OSWD).

== See also ==
- Schlagwortkatalog
- Faceted Application of Subject Terminology (FAST), a simplified syntax of LCSH
- Canadian Subject Headings (CSH)
