= Dorothea Arnold =

German Egyptologist (born 1935)

Dorothea Arnold (born Schadewaldt; born 1935, in Leipzig) is a German Egyptologist who specialises in Ancient Egyptian pottery.

Since 1985, she has worked with the Metropolitan Museum of Art where she became curator emeritus in 2012.

Arnold is the daughter of classical philologist Wolfgang Schadewaldt. She is married to Egyptologist Dieter Arnold. Their son Felix Arnold is an architect who works in the field of archeology.

== Publications ==
- Die Polykletnachfolge. Untersuchungen zur Kunst von Argos und Sikyon zwischen Polyklet und Lysipp. (= Jahrbuch des Deutschen Archäologischen Instituts. Ergänzungheft 25). de Gruyter, Berlin 1969 (= Dissertation).
- als Herausgeberin: Studien zur altägyptischen Keramik. von Zabern, Mainz 1982, ISBN 3-8053-0415-3.
- mit Janine Bourriau: An introduction to ancient Egyptian pottery. von Zabern, Mainz 1993, ISBN 3-8053-0623-7.
- The Royal Women of Amarna. Images of Beauty from Ancient Egypt Harry N. Abrams, Inc., New York 1996, ISBN 0-87099-816-1.
- Die ägyptische Kunst (= Beck’sche Reihe. Vol, 2550. C. H. Beck Wissen). Beck, München 2012, ISBN 978-3-406-63213-6.
