= Personennamendatei =

The Personennamendatei or PND (translated as Name Authority File) is an authority file of people, which served primarily to access literature in libraries. The PND has been built up between 1995 and 1998 and was published by the German National Library (DNB) until 2012. For each person, there is a record with their name, birth and occupation connected with a unique identifier, the PND number.

The PND comprises more than two million entries and is comparable with the Library of Congress Name Authority File (LCNAF). Since April 2012, the PND (which have since been discontinued) is part of the Gemeinsame Normdatei (GND) (aka Integrated Authority File).

For the exchange of name records, there is a separate machine exchange format for libraries called MAB-PND.

== See also ==
- Library of Congress
