= Integrated Authority File =

German database of authority data

Gemeinsame Normdatei
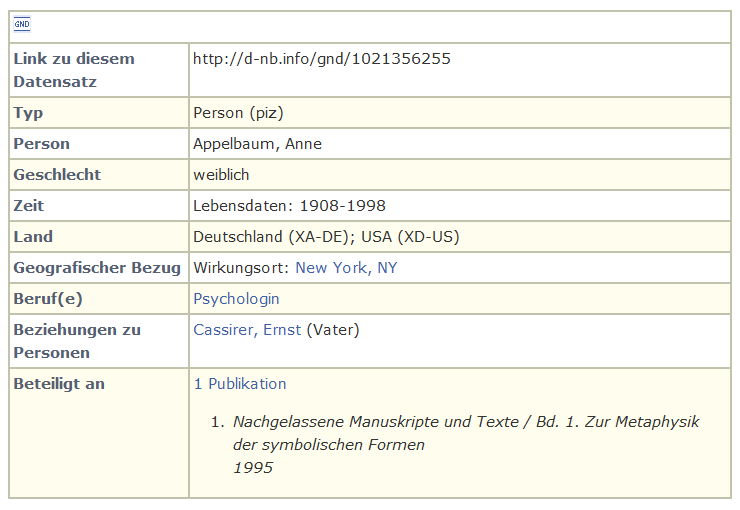
- GND: Screenshot of the German National Library.
- Acronym: GND
- Organisation: DNB
- Introduced: 5 April 2012
- Example: 7749153-1
- Website: d-nb.info/gnd

The Gemeinsame Normdatei (translated as Integrated Authority File) or GND is an international authority file for the organisation of personal names, subject headings and corporate bodies from catalogues. It is used mainly for documentation in libraries and increasingly also by archives and museums. The GND is managed by the German National Library (German: Deutsche Nationalbibliothek; DNB) in cooperation with various regional library networks in German-speaking Europe and other partners. The GND falls under the Creative Commons Zero (CC0) licence.

The GND specification provides a hierarchy of high-level entities and sub-classes, useful in library classification, and an approach to unambiguous identification of single elements. It also comprises an ontology intended for knowledge representation in the semantic web, available in the RDF format.

The GND became operational in April 2012 and integrates the content of the following authority files, which have since been discontinued:

- Personennamendatei (PND) (Translation: Name Authority File)
- Gemeinsame Körperschaftsdatei (GKD) (Translation: Corporate Bodies Authority File)
- Schlagwortnormdatei (SWD) (Translation: Subject Headings Authority File)
- Einheitssachtitel-Datei des Deutschen Musikarchivs (DMA-EST) (Translation: Uniform Title File of the German Music Archive)

It is referred to by identifiers named GND-ID.

At the time of its introduction on 5 April 2012, the GND held 9,493,860 files, including 2,650,000 personalised names. In July 2020 non-individualized files were deleted. In 2022, the GND held 9,370,736 files, including 5,937,788 personalised names.

The GND participates in the Virtual International Authority File (VIAF) project.

== Types of GND high-level entities ==
There are six main types of GND entities:

Typ	German (official)	English (translation)
p	Person	person
k	Körperschaft	corporate body
v	Veranstaltung	event
w	Werk	work
s	Sachbegriff	topical term
g	Geografikum	geographical place name
