= Canadian Subject Headings =

Canadian Subject Headings (CSH) is a list of subject headings in the English language, using controlled vocabulary, to access and express the topic content of documents on Canada and Canadian topics. Library and Archives Canada publishes and maintains CSH on the Web. Prior to the merger of the National Library of Canada and the National Archives of Canada, the National Library of Canada published a print version of CSH.

Université Laval also publishes Répertoire de vedettes-matière (RVM), a list intended to provide access to Canadian subject headings in the French language.

== See also ==
- Faceted Application of Subject Terminology (FAST), a simplified syntax of LCSH
- Library of Congress Subject Headings (LCSH)
- Subject Headings Authority File (SWD; German: Schlagwortnormdatei)
- RAMEAU (French: Répertoire d'autorité-matière encyclopédique et alphabétique unifié)
- Répertoire de vedettes-matière de l'Université Laval (RVM)

== General references ==
- Canadian Subject Headings
- Répertoire de vedettes-matière
