= ISO 2788 =

Monolingual thesauri for information retrieval

ISO 2788 was the ISO international standard for monolingual thesauri for information retrieval, first published in 1974 and revised in 1986. The official title of the standard was "Guidelines for the establishment and development of monolingual thesauri".

It was withdrawn in 2011 and replaced by ISO 25964-1.

== See also ==
- ISO 5964
