= Illegal aliens (Library of Congress Subject Heading) =

Subject term in The Library of Congress

Illegal aliens was a topical subject term in the Library of Congress Subject Headings thesaurus, a phrase assigned by librarians to describe the content of resources in a library catalog relating to undocumented immigration. The subject heading became a topic of political interest in the United States in 2016, when a decision by the Library of Congress to revise the heading and replace it with the terms Noncitizens and Unauthorized immigration was opposed by congressional Republicans. It was the first time in US history that Congress interfered in the determination of a Library of Congress Subject Heading. The Illegal aliens group of subject headings was replaced in 2021 with two headings, Noncitizens and Illegal immigration and the corresponding subheadings.

== Background ==
The subject heading Aliens, Illegal was established by the Library of Congress in 1980 and revised to Illegal aliens in 1993.

The subject heading incorporated references from non-preferred forms of the term including Aliens--Legal status, laws, etc.; Aliens, Illegal; Illegal aliens--Legal status, laws, etc.; Illegal immigrants; Illegal immigration; and Undocumented aliens. It also referenced related terms such as Alien detention centers and Human smuggling. Associated headings include Children of illegal aliens and Women illegal aliens.

== Calls for different wording ==
The Nobel Laureate Eliezer Elie Wiesel popularized the slogan "No human being is illegal", stating "you who are so-called illegal aliens should know that no human being is illegal. That is a contradiction in terms. Human beings can be beautiful or more beautiful, they can be fat or skinny, they can be right or wrong, but illegal? How can a human being be illegal?"

In 2010, racial justice organization Race Forward debuted a campaign to "Drop the I-Word," an effort to ask media sources to no longer use the word "illegal" when referring to undocumented immigrants, arguing that using the word to describe people was dehumanizing, racially charged, and legally inaccurate. Multiple news outlets stopped using "illegal" to describe people in the early 2010s.

In 2013, the Associated Press decided to use the word "illegal" only to refer to an action, not a person, as a person cannot technically be "illegal". Pulitzer Prize-winning journalist, Jose Antonio Vargas, explained, "The term dehumanizes and marginalizes the people it seeks to describe. Think of it this way, in what other context do we call someone illegal?"

Student activists at Dartmouth College, including the Dartmouth Coalition for Immigration Reform, Equality and DREAMERs (CoFIRED), issued a series of racial justice demands to the Dartmouth administration in February 2014, one of which requested the term Illegal aliens not be used in the library's catalog. Together with Dartmouth librarians, the students from CoFIRED submitted a formal request to the Library of Congress in the summer of 2014 for the heading to be revised to Undocumented immigrants. In February 2015, the Library of Congress announced it would not change the heading, in part because resources such as Black's Law Dictionary used "Illegal aliens" as an established term.

Librarian activists continued to gather support to ask for the heading's revision. The Council of the American Library Association passed a resolution in January 2016 calling the term "dehumanizing, offensive, inflammatory, and even a racial slur" and urging the Library of Congress to change the subject heading to Undocumented immigrants.

== 2016 announcement and subsequent developments ==
In March 2016, the Library of Congress announced that it would replace the heading with two new headings: Noncitizens and Unauthorized immigration. Following the announcement, Republican lawmakers made multiple attempts to block the revision of the subject heading, including the introduction of a bill by U.S. Representative Diane Black requiring the Library to retain the heading. In June 2016, the House of Representatives added a provision to the 2017 appropriations bill for the legislative branch requiring the Library of Congress to retain the heading without revision. While the final bill did not require LC to keep the "Illegal aliens" wording, LC was required "to make publicly available its process for changing or adding subject headings."

The 2019 documentary film Change the Subject, about the students at Dartmouth College, was screened throughout the U.S.

Over forty libraries and library systems revised the heading in their local catalogs. University libraries adopted alternative subject headings, cancelling "illegal alien", including the University of Colorado (2018), the California State University Libraries (2020), Harvard University (2021), Middlebury College (2021) and Vassar College (2021).

== 2021 revision ==
On November 12, 2021, the Library of Congress Policy and Standards Division announced they would replace the term Aliens with Noncitizens and the term Illegal aliens with Illegal immigration. That change was implemented in December 2021. Reactions to the chosen terms were mixed, with a letter signed by Senators Ted Cruz and Mike Braun calling the decision "a politically-motivated and Orwellian attempt to manipulate and control language," while some librarians expressed frustrations that the changed language remains dehumanizing.

== See also ==
- Library of Congress Classification
