= Alien (law) =

Person in a country not having citizenship

In law, an alien is a foreign-born resident who has not been naturalized and is still a citizen or subject of a foreign country, although definitions and terminology differ across legal systems.

== Lexicology ==
The term "alien" is derived from the Latin alienus. The Latin later came to mean a stranger, a foreigner, or someone not related by blood. Similar terms to "alien" in this context include foreigner and lander.

=== Categories ===
Different countries around the world use varying terms for foreign nationals, also called non-citizens. Those who have relinquished their citizenship and/or nationality may or not be an alien in the host country. The following are general categories:

- permanent resident — any immigrant who has been lawfully admitted into a nation and granted the legal right to remain therein as a permanent resident, including registered refugees, in accord with the nation's immigration laws.
- temporary resident — any foreign national who has been lawfully granted permission by the government to drive, fly, travel, lodge, reside, study or work for a specific number of years and then apply for an extension or leave the country before such permission expires.
- nonresident alien — any foreign national, such as a travel visa holder or a foreign tourist, who is lawfully within a nation but whose legal domicile is in another nation.
- alien enemy (or enemy alien) — any foreign national of any country that is at war with the host country.
- undocumented alien (or removable alien) — any person who has been found to be "subject to removal" by an Immigration Judge, generally because of one of three reasons: (a) violating the terms of the visa, (b) being convicted of specified crimes, or (c) entering the territory without formal authorization.

== Common law jurisdictions ==
An "alien" in English law denoted any person born outside of the monarch's dominions and who did not owe allegiance to the monarch. Aliens were not allowed to own land and were subject to different taxes to subjects. This idea was passed on in the Commonwealth to other common law jurisdictions.

=== Australia ===
In Australia, citizenship is defined in the Australian nationality law. Non-citizens in Australia are permanent residents, temporary residents, or "unlawful non-citizens". Most non-citizens (including those who lack citizenship documents) traveling to Australia must obtain a visa prior to travel. The only exceptions to the rule are holders of New Zealand passports and citizenship, who may apply for a visa on arrival according to the Trans-Tasman Travel Arrangement.

In 2020, in Love v Commonwealth, the High Court of Australia ruled that Aboriginal Australians (as defined in Mabo v Queensland (No 2)) cannot be considered aliens under the Constitution of Australia, regardless of whether they were born in Australia or hold Australian citizenship.

=== Canada ===
In Canada, the Immigration and Refugee Protection Act defines a foreign national as "a person who is not a Canadian citizen or a permanent resident, and includes a stateless person." The term "alien" is not used in federal statutes.

=== United Kingdom ===
In the United Kingdom, the British Nationality Act 1981 defines an alien as a person who is not a British citizen, a citizen of Ireland, a Commonwealth citizen, or a British protected person. The Aliens Act 1905, the British Nationality and Status of Aliens Act 1914 and the Aliens Restriction (Amendment) Act 1919 were all products of the turbulence in the early part of the 20th century.

=== United States ===
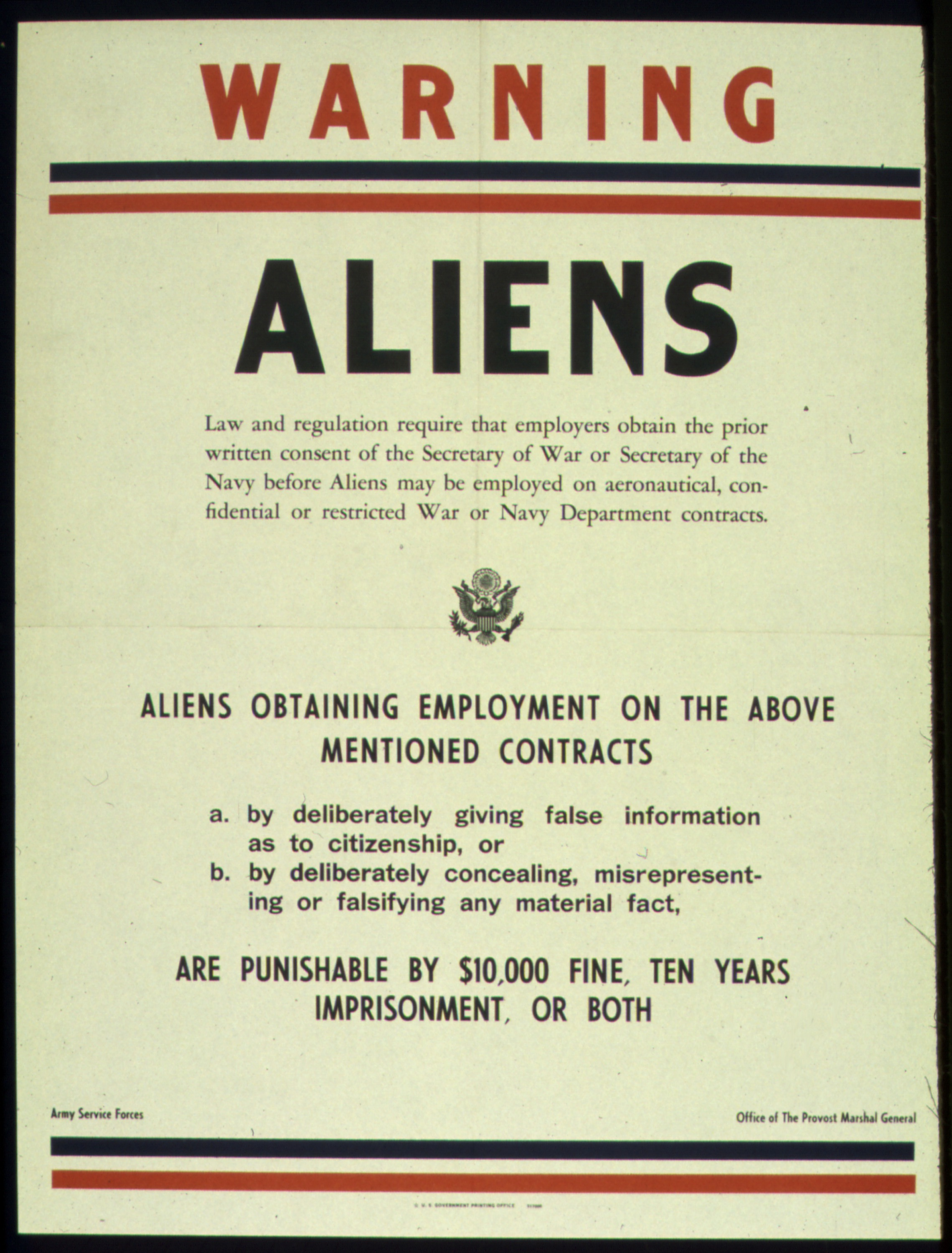
World War II poster

In the United States, the term "alien" is synonymous with foreign national. Under the Immigration and Nationality Act (INA) of the United States, "[t]he term 'alien' means any person not a citizen or national of the United States." People born in American Samoa or on Swains Island are statutorily "non-citizen nationals." Others, such as natives of Palau and the Marshall Islands, are noncitizen "nonimmigrants without visas" for INA purposes.

Every refugee that is admitted to the United States under 8 U.S.C. § 1157 automatically becomes an "immigrant" and then a "special immigrant" after receiving a green card.

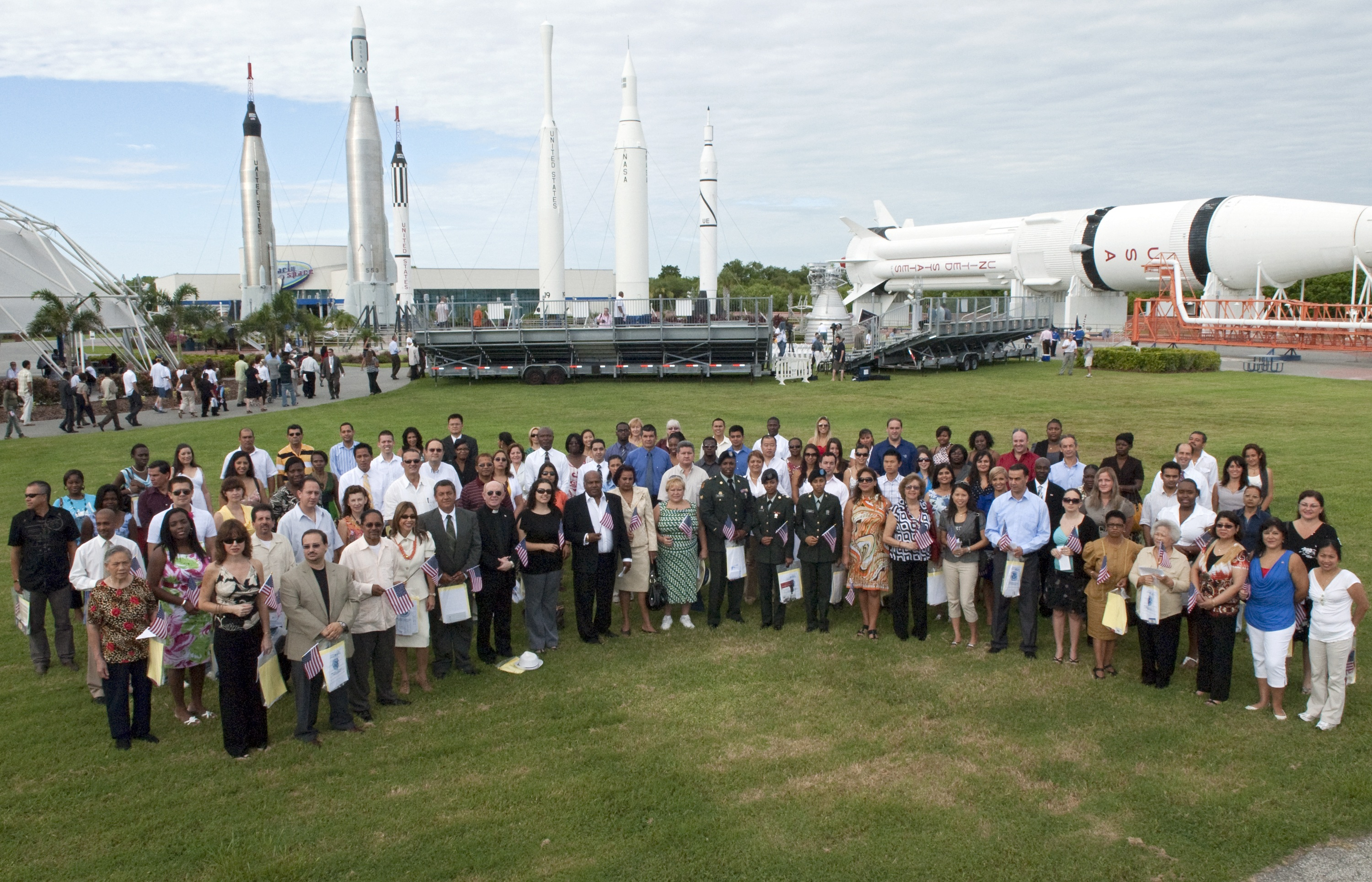
People of various background became naturalized at Kennedy Space Center in Florida (2010). Before the naturalization they were lawfully admitted permanent resident aliens.

The usage of the term "alien" dates back to 1790, when it was used in the Naturalization Act and then 1798 when it was used in the Alien and Sedition Acts. The INA contains 22 occurrences and a clear definition of the category of "alien lawfully admitted" and one occurrence of "illegal alien", with no explicit definition. The later is mentioned in a number of provisions under title 8 of the US code. Several provisions mention the term "unauthorized alien". "undocumented alien" or "undocumented person. According to PolitiFact, the term "illegal alien" scarcely occurs in federal law and is undefined or part of an introductory title or limited to apply to certain individuals convicted of felonies." According to Jeff Baker of the Pepperdine School of Law, 'alien' may be a technical term of art, but 'illegal alien' is almost always pejorative in contemporary usage."

The US Library of Congress replaced the term in 2021, adopting the subject headings "noncitizens" and "illegal immigration" in 2021. In that year, President Joe Biden similarly ordered Customs and Border Protection and ICE to use "noncitizen" rather than "alien." This policy, which was criticized for failing to distinguish between United States nationals and foreigners, was revoked by the second administration of Donald Trump in 2025.

There are a multitude of U.S. domestic tax laws and regulations affecting the U.S. tax residency of foreign nationals, both nonresident aliens and resident aliens, in addition to income tax and social security tax treaties and totalization agreements.

"Alienage", i.e., citizenship status, has been prohibited since 1989 in New York City from being considered for employment, under that city's Human Rights legislation.

== Other jurisdictions ==
=== Arab states ===
In the Gulf Cooperation Council (United Arab Emirates, Saudi Arabia, Kuwait, Oman, Bahrain, and Qatar), many non-natives have lived in the region since birth. However, these Arab states do not easily grant citizenship to non-natives. Most stateless Bedoon in Kuwait belong to indigenous northern tribes.

=== Europe ===
The European Parliament withdrew the term "alien" from documents relative to Eurodac, a European Union-wide biometric database that collects and maintains fingerprint records of non-EU/European Economic Area (EEA), adopting "third-country national or a stateless person".

== See also ==
- Alien land laws
- Alien Tort Statute
- California Alien Land Law of 1913
- Gaijin
- Laowai
- Persona non grata
- Unaccompanied Alien Children
