= Change the Subject =

2019 documentary film

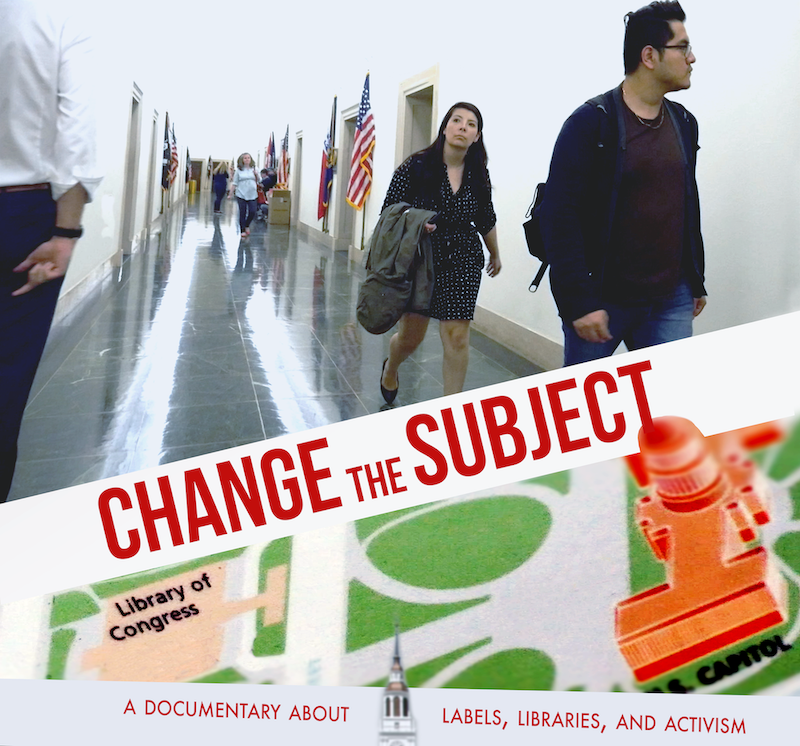
- Change the Subject film poster
- Directed by: Jill Baron, Sawyer Broadley
- Produced by: Óscar Rubén Cornejo Cásares, Melissa Padilla
- Starring: Óscar Rubén Cornejo Cásares, Melissa Padilla
- Release date: 2019
- Running time: 55 minutes
- Country: United States
- Language: English
- Budget: $25,000

Change the Subject is a 2019 documentary film directed by Jill Baron and Sawyer Broadley. The film documents Dartmouth College students lobbying the Library of Congress to replace the term "Illegal aliens" with "Undocumented immigrants" in the Library of Congress Subject Headings. While ultimately unsuccessful, the efforts of the students have inspired individual libraries to replace the term.

== Background ==
Library of Congress Subject Headings consist of controlled vocabulary terms developed and maintained by the Library of Congress (LC); the thesaurus is the most widely used subject vocabulary in the world.

The subject heading "Aliens, Illegal" was established by LC in 1980 and revised to "Illegal aliens" in 1993. LC has changed terms in the past once they are perceived to have become outdated. For example, the term "Negroes" was changed to "Blacks" in the 1970s, which was later split off to provide a new term for "Afro-Americans" in the 1990s, which was then changed to "African Americans" in 2000. By 2014, many news organizations in the US, including the Associated Press, USA Today, American Broadcasting Company, Chicago Tribune and the Los Angeles Times, had already ceased using the term "illegal" to refer to migrants lacking visa documentation.

== Film content ==
The term illegal alien is particularly problematic because of several reasons; the first in the way it is weaponized, and utilized in society. It is meant to be derogatory and dehumanize.

— Oscar Cornejo Casares

The film centers around Óscar Rubén Cornejo Cásares and Melissa Padilla, who noticed the term "Illegal aliens" appearing in the library catalog at Dartmouth College while they were completing their undergraduate degrees. After being told Dartmouth used the standardized terminology maintained by LC, and that the term could not be changed locally, Cásares, Padilla and other students petitioned LC directly in 2014 to change the term to "Undocumented immigrants". Their petition was rejected. The students and other librarians then successfully petitioned the American Library Association (ALA) to endorse the revision.

Following the endorsement from the ALA and other organizations, Dartmouth students petitioned LC a second time in 2016. LC accepted and agreed to change the term, but faced a backlash from several Republican members of Congress. Representative Diane Black initiated legislation to block the change in April 2016, on the grounds it was "political correctness" and disrespectful to change a term which she incorrectly claimed had been used by LC since the "early 1900s". It was the first time Congress had attempted to halt LC changing a catalog term. Following the Republican backlash, LC did not change the term in their system. Library of Congress administrators declined to be interviewed for the documentary.

== Aftermath ==
Despite the efforts of the students being unsuccessful, many libraries inspired by the Dartmouth students have replaced the term "Illegal aliens" in their own local catalog systems, and have continued to pressure LC to change the term. Institutions that have voluntarily changed the term include the University of California, Berkeley, the University of Colorado Boulder, California State University, and Yale University. On November 15, 2021, the Library of Congress announced the decision to replace the terms "Aliens" with "Noncitizens," along with replacing the heading "Illegal aliens" with the headings "Noncitizens" and "Illegal immigration."

The film has been screened at many universities, often accompanied by activists featured in the film for panel discussions, and was an official selection at the 2019 Maine International Film Festival and the 2019 Boston Latino International Film Festival.
