= Academic Search =

Monthly bibliographic indexing service

Academic Search Complete
- Producer: EBSCO publishing (United States)
- History: 1990 or 1997 to present
- Languages: Multilingual – native languages

Access
- Providers: EBSCO host

Coverage
- Disciplines: Humanities, Arts, Sciences, Social Sciences
- Record depth: Index, abstract, full-text, citation indexing
- Format coverage: Full-text, academic journal titles, author, publication dates, abstracts, summations, cited references, and relevant images
- Temporal coverage: PDF back-files to 1887
- Geospatial coverage: Global
- Update frequency: Daily

Print edition
- ISSN: 1097-0886

Links
- Website: www.ebscohost.com/academic/academic-search-complete
- Title list(s): www.ebscohost.com/titleLists/a9h-journals.htm

Academic Search is a monthly indexing service. It was first published in 1997 by EBSCO Publishing in Ipswich, Massachusetts. Its academic focus is international universities, covering social science, education, psychology, and other subjects. Publishing formats covered are academic journals, magazines, newspapers, and CD-ROM.

== Academic Search Complete ==
Academic Search Complete was first published in 2007 as Academic Premier. It is an indexing and abstracting service, accessible via the World Wide Web. Coverage includes more than 8,500 full-text periodicals, including more than 7,300 peer-reviewed journals. In addition to full text, Academic Complete offers indexing and abstracts for more than 10,100 journals and a total of more than 10,600 publications including monographs, reports, conference proceedings, among others. Although coverage is from 1965 to the present, PDF back-file content coverage is from 1887.

Subject areas covered include: animal science, anthropology, area studies, astronomy, biology, chemistry, civil engineering, electrical engineering, ethnic and multicultural studies, food science including related technology, general science, geography, geology, law, materials science, mathematics, mechanical engineering, music, pharmaceutical sciences, physics, psychology, religion and theology, veterinary science, women's studies, zoology and other fields. It is updated on a daily basis.

Field searches include full text articles (references can be included), academic journal titles, author, publication dates, abstracts, summations, cited references, and relevant images. Article results can also include thumbnail images.

== See also ==
- List of academic databases and search engines
- Google Scholar
