= Rameau (disambiguation) =

Jean-Philippe Rameau (1683–1764) was one of the most important French composers and music theorists of the 18th century.

Rameau may also refer to:

- Rameau (crater), a crater on Mercury
- 4734 Rameau (1982 UQ3), a main-belt asteroid
- RAMEAU, a French-language equivalent of Répertoire de vedettes-matière de l'Université Laval (RVM) still in use today

== People with the surname ==
- Emil Rameau (1878–1957), German theatre director and actor
- Pierre Rameau (1674–1748), French Maître à danser (Master of dance) and theorist

== People with the given name ==
- Rameau Thierry Sokoudjou (born 1984), mixed martial artist
- Rameau Poleon, folk fiddler from Saint Lucia

== See also ==
- Rameau's Nephew, a philosophical dialogue by Denis Diderot
