= Ngata people =

Ethnic group in the Democratic Republic of the Congo

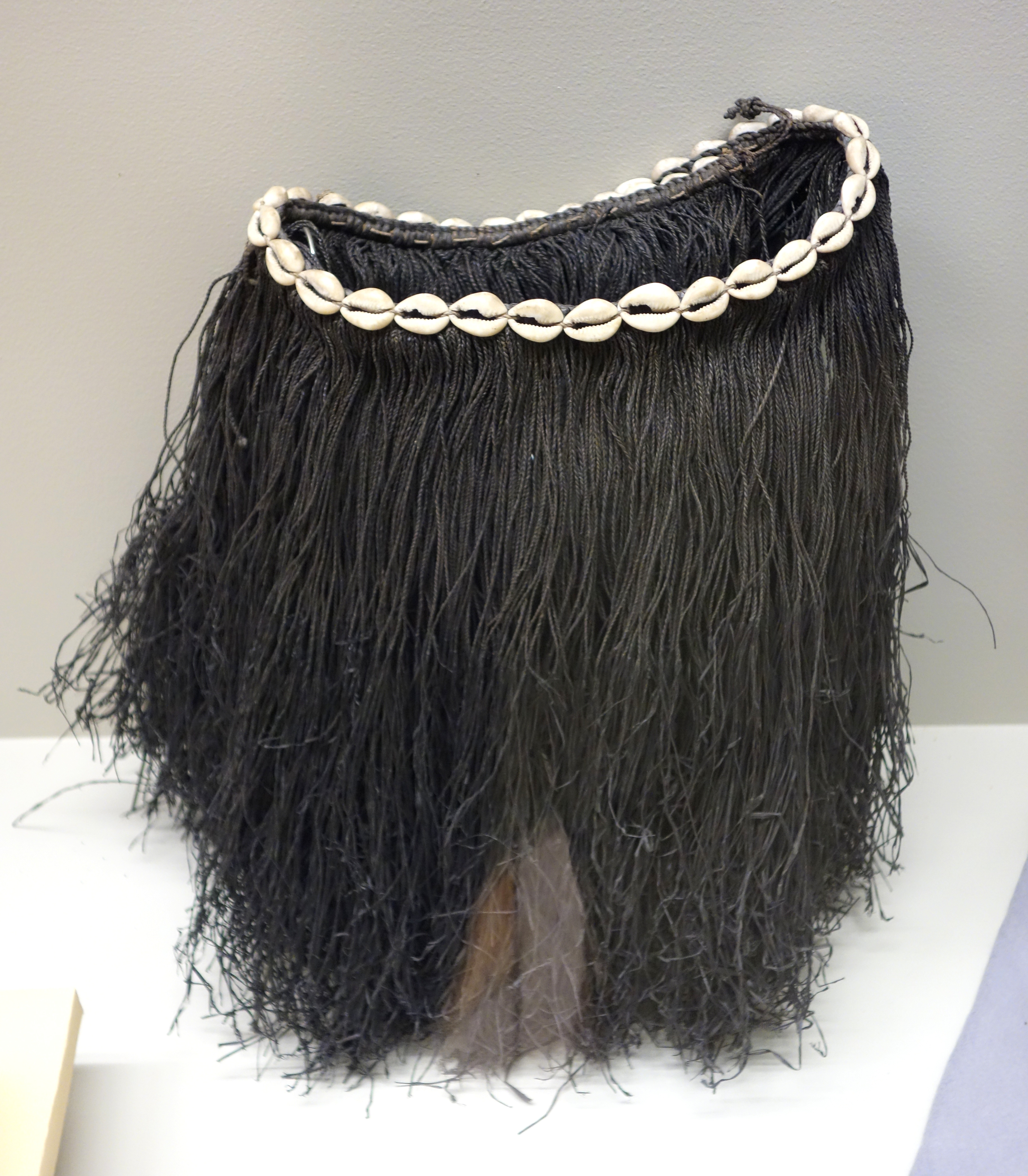
Ngata skirt

Ngata people are Bantus from the Democratic Republic of the Congo, Central Africa.

== Etymology ==
Ngatas are mentioned under various names in various sources. These include the following ones: Ngatas, Wangata.

== See also ==
- Ethnic groups of Africa

== Sources ==
- (in French) « Ngata » (notice Library of Congress Subject Headings, BnF)
- (in French) Alphonse Engels, Les Wangata (tribu du Congo belge). Étude ethnographique, Vromant, Bruxelles, 1912, 101 p. + pl.
