= Knowledge organization system =

Knowledge organization system (KOS), concept system, or concept scheme is the generic term used in knowledge organization (KO) for the selection of concepts with an indication of selected semantic relations. Despite their differences in type, coverage, and application, all KOS aim to support the organization of knowledge and information to facilitate their management and retrieval.

KOS vary in complexity from simple sorted lists to complex relational networks. They represent both structural and functional features, and serve to eliminate ambiguity, control synonyms, establish relationships, and present properties. From their origins in library and information science (LIS), KOS have been applied to other domains and disciplines within science and industry, although scholarly research and debate remain primarily within the KO field. Challenges of KOS include ambiguity of terminology, repercussions of biased systems, and potential obsolescence.

KOS can be expressed in RDF and RDFS as per the Simple Knowledge Organization System (SKOS) recommendation by W3C, which aims to enable the sharing and linking of KOS via the Web.

One of the largest collections of KOS is the BARTOC registry.

== Types ==
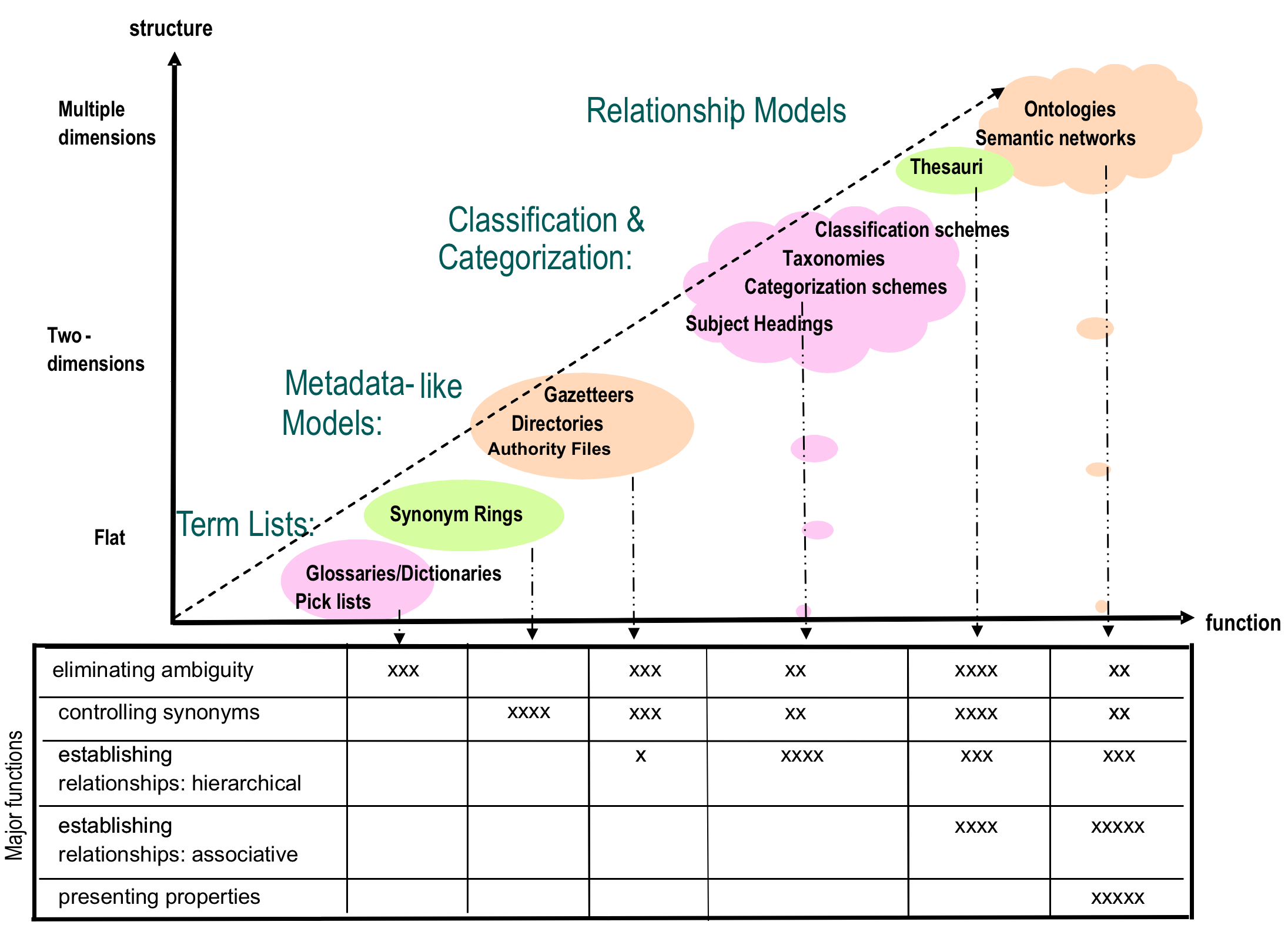
The "semantic staircase" of key structural components and functional roles of Knowledge Organization Systems (KOS) by Zeng (2008)

While different schema of KOS have been proposed, most are generally arranged in terms of the complexity of their construction and maintenance. Some scholars argue that organizing KOS on a spectrum oversimplifies the shared characteristics among them, and may even result in a non-ideal structure being chosen.

The following types are not exhaustive, and are often not mutually-exclusive in practice.

=== Term lists ===
Term lists are the least structured form of KOS. They include lists, glossaries, dictionaries, and synonym rings. Authority files and gazetteers may also be considered term lists, however other scholars categorize them and directories as "metadata-like models".

Examples include the Union List of Artist Names name authority file and the GeoNames gazetteer.

=== Categorization and classification ===
KOS that emphasize specific (and often hierarchical) structures include subject headings, taxonomies, categorization schema, and classification schema & systems.

Despite inconsistent use of the terms "categorization" and "classification" in some literature, categorization is generally loosely-assembled grouping schema and may include attributes that are not mutually exclusive (or having fuzzy boundaries), while classification is related to the arrangement of non-overlapping and mutually-exclusive classes.

Classification schema may be universal (such as Dewey Decimal Classification and Information Coding Classification) or domain-specific (such as the National Library of Medicine Classification).

=== Relationship models ===
The types of KOS with greatest complexity and which utilize connections between concepts include thesauri, (Note: In information retrieval, thesauri are a network of controlled vocabulary (not to be confused with its homonym relating to a synonym dictionary).) semantic networks, and ontologies.

One of the most prominent examples of a semantic network is WordNet.

=== Others ===
Certain structures proposed to be considered types of KOS—but are not consistently included in schema—include folksonomies, topic maps, web directory structures, publication organization systems, and bibliometric maps.

Some KOS organize other KOS themselves—for instance, PeriodO is a gazetteer of periodization categories.

== Applications ==
Some early KOS were developed as a support system for abstracting and indexing services to be used by specially-trained searchers. With the growth of information digitization, usability became increasingly accessible, and more complex structures were developed.

Prominent examples of KOS outside of LIS include organism taxonomy in biology, the periodic table of elements in chemistry, SIC and NAICS classification systems for industry & business, and AGROVOC agricultural controlled vocabulary.

== Challenges ==
The study and design of KOS is an ongoing topic of discussion among KO scholars.

=== Terminology ===
[There is] a serious lack of vocabulary control in the literature on controlled vocabulary.

— Bella Hass Weinberg, 1998

Inconsistency of terminology within the study of KOS is a common issue. For instance, "ontology" is used for both a specific type of KOS as well as a generic term for any KOS. The terms "taxonomy", "classification", and "categorization" are also sometimes used interchangeably.

=== Bias ===
As knowledge can be historically and culturally biased, scholars have also discussed how KOS themselves can perpetuate harmful practices or stereotypes. For example, a number of concerns and criticisms about the classification of mental disorders in the Diagnostic and Statistical Manual of Mental Disorders have been raised, contributing to ongoing revisions.

Ethical and intentional design approaches have been proposed for multi-perspective KOS in efforts to mitigate bias and other harmful practices.

=== Obsolescence ===
The possible obsolescence of the thesaurus and other simpler KOS has been the topic of debate, especially in the face of increasingly complex ontologies, the growing usage of "Google-like retrieval systems", and the move of KO theory and research away from LIS and toward computer science. Supporters of thesauri argue its continued usefulness for metadata enrichment, vocabulary mapping, and web services, as well as its usage in specific domains such as corporate intranets and digital image libraries.

== See also ==
- Library classification
- Information retrieval
- Epistemology
- Metadata
