= Overcategorization =

Concept in document classification

Overcategorization or category clutter is a phenomenon during classification where too many categories or classes are assigned to a document, record, or item. Overcategorization is related to the library and information science (LIS) concepts of document classification and subject indexing. It is also related to online shopping where excessive product categories can overwhelm users with too many choices or make it more difficult for customers to find the products they need. Although these categories are intended to improve organization and ease of navigation when shipping online, too many categories can lower customer satisfaction, increase difficulty navigating the online store, and reduce future shopping intentions.

In LIS, the ideal number of terms that should be assigned to classify an item are measured by the variables precision and recall. Assigning few category labels that are most closely related to the content of the item being classified will result in searches that have high precision, I.e., where a high proportion of the results are closely related to the query. Assigning more category labels to each item will reduce the precision of each search, but increase the recall, retrieving more relevant results. Related LIS concepts include exhaustivity of indexing and information overload.

== Basic principles ==
If too many categories are assigned to a given document, the implications for users depend on how informative the links are. If the user is able to distinguish between useful and not useful links, the damage is limited: The user only wastes time selecting links. In many cases, however, the user cannot judge whether or not a given link will turn out to be fruitful. In that case he or she has to follow the link and to read or skim another document. The worst case scenario is, of course, that even after reading the new document the user is unable to decide whether or not it might be useful if its subject matter is not thoroughly investigated.

Overcategorization also has another unpleasant implication: It makes the system (for example in Wikipedia) difficult to maintain in a consistent way. If the system is inconsistent, it means that when the user considers the links in a given category, he or she will not find all documents relevant to that category.

Basically, the problem of overcategorization should be understood from the perspective of relevance and the traditional measures of recall and precision. If too few relevant categories are assigned to a document, recall may decrease. If too many non-relevant categories are assigned, precision becomes lower. The hard job is to say which categories are fruitful or relevant for future use of the document.

== See also ==
- Exhaustivity
- Information overload
- Information pollution
- Relevance
- Subject (documents)
- Subject indexing
- Overfitting
