= ISO 5964 =

International standard

ISO 5964 was the ISO standard for the establishment and development of multilingual thesauri. Its full title was Guidelines for the establishment and development of multilingual thesauri. It was withdrawn in 2011, when replaced by ISO 25964-1. See more explanation on the official website for ISO 25964

== See also ==
- ISO 25964-1:2011 Information and documentation -- Thesauri and interoperability with other vocabularies -- Part 1: Thesauri for information retrieval
