= BARTOC =

Database of knowledge organization systems

Basic Register of Thesauri, Ontologies & Classifications
- Developers: International Society for Knowledge Organization (ISKO), project coli-conc
- Release: November 2013; 12 years ago
- Type: Terminology registry / Knowledge Organization Systems database
- License: Public Domain Dedication and License (PDDL)
- Website: bartoc.org

The Basic Register of Thesauri, Ontologies & Classifications (BARTOC) is a database of Knowledge Organization Systems. Its main goal is to document knowledge organization systems (KOS), such as classifications, thesauri and authority files, in one place, in order to achieve greater visibility, highlight their features, make them searchable and comparable, and foster knowledge sharing. In contrast to other terminology registries, BARTOC includes any kind of KOS from any subject area, in any language, any publication format, and any form of accessibility. In addition, it manages a list of other terminology registries.

The creation of BARTOC was motivated by the need to create a bibliography and to teach information literacy. BARTOC launched in November 2013 and by November 2020 had collected information about more than 5,000 terminologies and almost 100 terminology registries. A comparative study of terminology types and registries confirmed BARTOC to contain "a relatively sufficient amount of metadata". Its content is available as public domain with the Public Domain Dedication and License (PDDL).

A circle of international editors has gathered around BARTOC from twelve countries across Europe. BARTOC has been approved by the International Society for Knowledge Organization.

In November 2020 the implementation of BARTOC was moved from Drupal at the University Library of Basel to a new technical infrastructure developed with project coli-conc. Since then, BARTOC has been hosted at the Common Library Network (GBV) in Göttingen.
