= Index term =

Word or phrase to label the topic of a document

In information retrieval, an index term (also known as subject term, subject heading, descriptor, or keyword) is a term that captures the essence of the topic of a document. Index terms make up a controlled vocabulary for use in bibliographic records. They are an integral part of bibliographic control, which is the function by which libraries collect, organize and disseminate documents. They are used as keywords to retrieve documents in an information system, for instance, a catalog or a search engine. A popular form of keywords on the web are tags, which are directly visible and can be assigned by non-experts. Index terms can consist of a word, phrase, or alphanumerical term. They are created by analyzing the document either manually with subject indexing or automatically with automatic indexing or more sophisticated methods of keyword extraction. Index terms can either come from a controlled vocabulary or be freely assigned.

The term "descriptor" was by Calvin Mooers in 1948. It is in particular used about a preferred term from a thesaurus.

The Simple Knowledge Organization System language (SKOS) provides a way to express index terms with Resource Description Framework for use in the context of the Semantic Web.

== In web search engines ==
Most web search engines are designed to search for words anywhere in a document—the title, the body, and so on. This being the case, a keyword can be any term that exists within the document. However, priority is given to words that occur in the title, words that recur numerous times, and words that are explicitly assigned as keywords within the coding. Index terms can be further refined using Boolean operators such as "AND, OR, NOT." "AND" is normally unnecessary as most search engines infer it. "OR" will search for results with one search term or another or both. "NOT" eliminates a word or phrase from the search, getting rid of any results that include it. Multiple words can also be enclosed in quotation marks to turn the individual index terms into a specific index phrase. These modifiers and methods all help to refine search terms, to better maximize the accuracy of search results.

== Author keywords ==
Author keywords are an integral part of literature. Many journals and databases provide access to index terms made by authors of the respective articles. How qualified the provider is decides the quality of both indexer-provided index terms and author-provided index terms. The quality of these two types of index terms is of research interest, particularly in relation to information retrieval. In general, an author will have difficulty providing indexing terms that characterize his or her document relative to other documents in the database.

== Examples ==
- Canadian Subject Headings (CS)
- Library of Congress Subject Headings (LCSH)
- Medical Subject Headings (MeSH)
- Polythematic Structured Subject Heading System (PSH)
- Subject Headings Authority File (SWD)

== See also ==
- Index (publishing)
- Keyword density
- Subject (documents)
- Tag (metadata)
- Tag cloud
