= Library of Congress Subject Headings =

Controlled vocabulary of bibliographic index terms

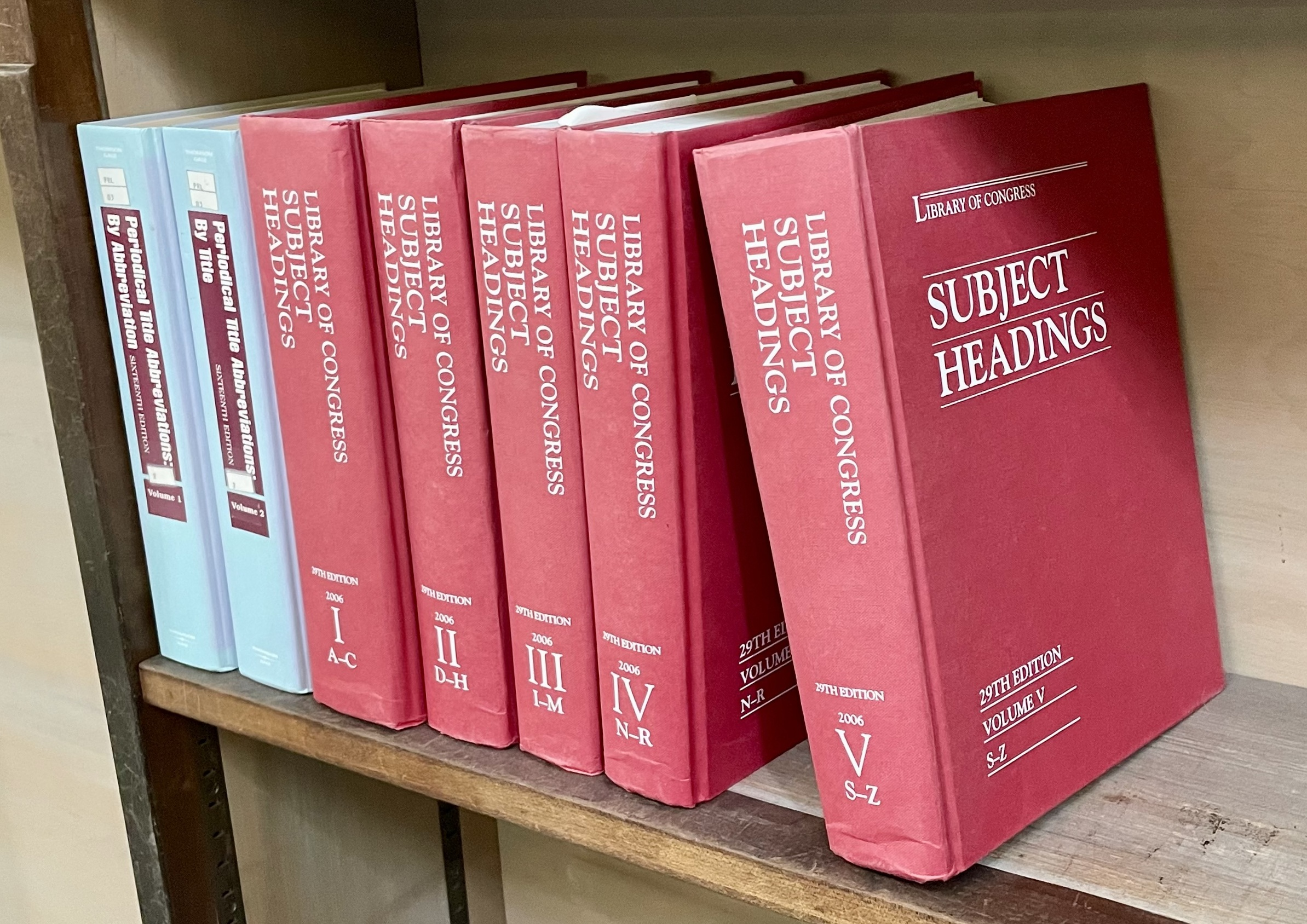
Printed Library of Congress Subject Headings, 29th edition.

The Library of Congress Subject Headings (LCSH) comprise a thesaurus (in the information science sense, a controlled vocabulary) of subject headings, maintained by the United States Library of Congress, for use in bibliographic records. LC Subject Headings are an integral part of bibliographic control, which is the function by which libraries collect, organize, and disseminate documents. It was first published in 1898, a year after the publication of Library of Congress Classification (1897). The last print edition was published in 2016. Access to the continuously revised vocabulary is now available via subscription and free services.

Subject headings are normally applied to every item within a library's collection and facilitate a user's access to items in the catalog that pertain to similar subject matter, in order to save time finding items of related subject matter. Only searching for items by 'title' or other descriptive fields, such as 'author' or 'publisher', would take more time and potentially miss locating many items because of the ineffective and inefficient search capability.

== An art and a science ==
The use of subject headings is a human and intellectual endeavor, by which trained professionals apply topic descriptions to items in their collections. Without a uniform standard, each library might choose to categorize the subject matter of their items differently. The widespread use and acceptance of the Library of Congress Subject Headings facilitates the uniform access to and retrieval of items in libraries across the world; users can use the same search strategy and LCSH thesaurus, if the correct headings have been applied to the item by the library. Some LCSH decisions are achieved by extensive debate and even controversy in the library community.

LCSH is the world's most widely used subject vocabulary. Despite LCSH's wide-ranging and comprehensive scope, libraries that deal with more specific types of collections or user communities may use other vocabularies; for example, many medical libraries in the United States use the National Library of Medicine's Medical Subject Headings (MeSH).

== Policy issues ==
Historically, given the complicated nature of the United States, its various ethnic groups, and changing society, numerous classification issues have been related to the terms used to identify racial or ethnic groups. The terms used to describe African Americans have changed over time, especially during the 20th century.

Until the 1990s, the LCSH administrators had a strict policy of not changing terms for a subject category. This was enforced to tighten and eliminate the duplication or confusion that might arise if subject headings were changed. As a result, the term 'Afro-American' to describe African-American topics in LCSH was used long after it lost currency and acceptance in the population. In 1996 LCSH decided to allow some alteration of terms to better reflect the needs and access of library users.

But, many common terms, or 'natural language' terms, are not used in LCSH. This may limit the ability of users to locate items. Research has increased in Library and Information Science faculties related to identifying and understanding the cultural and gender biases that affect the terms used in LCSH; these may limit or deprive library users access to information stored and disseminated in collections. In 2016 LCSH was subject to national news coverage when the Library of Congress decided to revise the heading 'Illegal aliens', an action opposed by congressional Republicans.

Sanford Berman, a notable American science scholar on this subject, has noted the difficulty in finding material on certain topics, such as various denialisms, because the Library of Congress has not yet incorporated the natural language terms for them, for example, climate change denialism, into LCSH.

As ideas about human sexuality have changed in the United States since the late 20th century, the LCSH has been criticized for biased organization and description of materials on sexuality. For instance, works about heterosexuality are scarcely labeled as such in LCSH; this suggests that heterosexuality is the norm and only queer sexuality needs a separate classification.

=== Data access ===
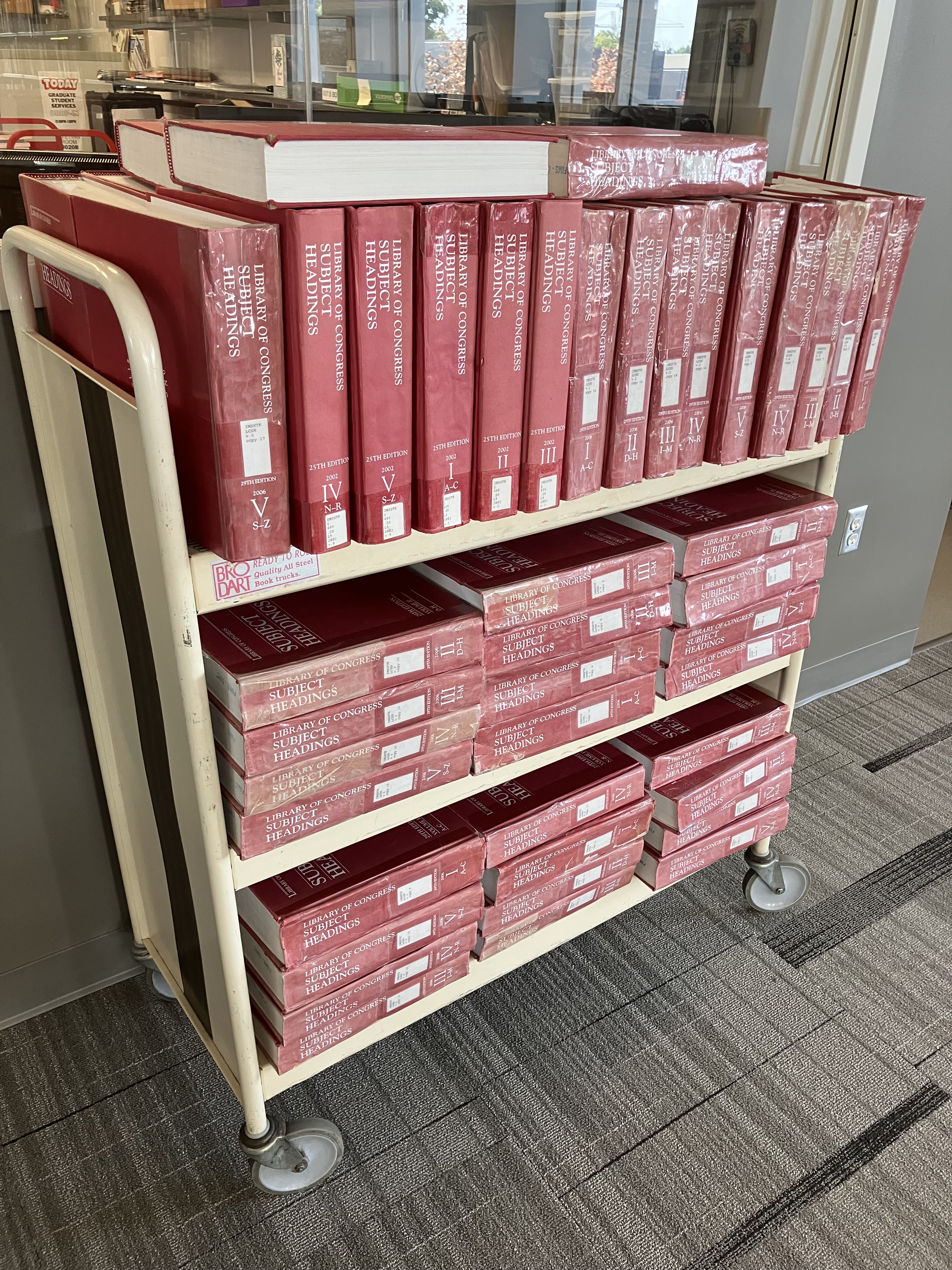
The large red LCSH volumes used for educating librarians in Canada

The Subject Headings were formerly published in large red volumes (currently ten), which are typically displayed in the reference sections of research libraries. They also may be accessed online in the Library of Congress Classification Web, a subscription service, or free of charge (as individual records) at Library of Congress Authorities. The Library of Congress adds new headings and revisions to LCSH each month.

A web service was set up by Ed Summers, a Library of Congress employee, circa April 2008, using SKOS to allow for simple browsing of the subject headings. lcsh.info was shut down by the Library of Congress's order on December 18, 2008. The library science and semantic web communities were dismayed, as expressed by Tim Spalding of LibraryThing.

After some delay, the Library set up its own web service for LCSH browsing at id.loc.gov in April 2009.

== Usage ==
Timothy Binga, director of libraries at the Center for Inquiry, notes issues that make it more difficult to use the standardized language of LCSH to find material. These include systems that allow patrons to informally tag materials in the catalog, book creators and publishers who do their own cataloging, and the incorrect application of LCSH to controversial material.

Increasingly, the use of hyperlinked, web-based Online Public Access Catalogues, or OPACs, allow users to hyperlink to a list of similar items displayed by LCSH once one item of interest is located. But, because LCSH are not necessarily expressed in natural language, many users may choose to search OPACs by keywords. Moreover, users unfamiliar with OPAC searching and LCSH, may incorrectly assume their library has no items on their desired topic, if they chose to search by 'subject' field, and the terms they entered do not strictly conform to a LCSH. For example, 'body temperature regulation' is used in place of 'thermoregulation'. The easiest way to find and use LCSH is to start with a 'keyword' search and then look at the Subject Headings of a relevant item to locate other related material.

== Criticism ==
=== Indigenous studies ===
LCSH use the term "Indian" which is considered inappropriate for scholarly use outside of referencing the Indian Act, or similar historical legislature. The ambiguous nature of the word also perpetuates a cycle of miscataloguing. On WorldCat, the search terms "Indians – Food" give results on South Asian Cuisine, while "Indian cooking" does not yield any results relating to Indigenous cooking.

LCSH has not adequately represented Native American perspectives. Cheryl Metoyer and Sandra Littletree created the Mashantucket Pequot Thesaurus of American Indian Terminology to add these perspectives into controlled vocabularies.

Shavonn Matsuda, a Hawaiian librarian, created the Hawaiian Knowledge Organization System because she found the LCSH unhelpful in accessing Hawaiian resources.

=== Judaica ===
The compilation Library of Congress Subject Headings in Jewish Studies does not have a separate list of generally applicable subdivisions or geographic headings, but the introduction notes that it does include "the generally applicable subdivisions for Jews, Judaism, Hebrew language, and Israel". The compiler goes on to explain that "some of these subdivisions are based on the pattern headings for ethnic groups, religions, languages, and places". Subdivisions based on pattern headings are interfiled with generally applicable ones (e.g., Encyclopedias), so it is hard for the Judaica cataloger to identify the subdivisions of Israel that may be applied to Holocaust for example.

== Developments in Canada ==
LCSH representatives worked with staff of the National Library of Canada to create a complementary set of Canadian Subject Headings (CSH) to express the topic content of documents on Canada and Canadian topics.

The Xwi7xwa Library at the Vancouver branch of the University of British Columbia use First Nations House of Learning (FNHL) Subject Headings. It is fully integrated with the main UBC Library.

== See also ==
- AGROVOC
- Books in the United States
- Comparison of Dewey and Library of Congress subject classification
- Faceted Application of Subject Terminology (FAST), a simplified syntax of LCSH
- Library of Congress Linked Data Service
- Library of Congress Control Number (LCCN)
- Library of Congress Classification
- Minnie Earl Sears: formulated the Sears Subject Headings, a simplification for use by small libraries.
