= Controlled vocabulary =

Method of organizing knowledge

A controlled vocabulary provides a way to organize knowledge for subsequent retrieval. Controlled vocabularies are used in subject indexing schemes, subject headings, thesauri, taxonomies, and other knowledge organization systems. Controlled vocabulary schemes mandate the use of predefined, preferred terms that have been preselected by the designers of the schemes, in contrast to natural language vocabularies, which have no such restriction.

== In library and information science ==
In library and information science, controlled vocabulary is a carefully selected list of words and phrases, which are used to tag units of information (document or work) so that they may be more easily retrieved by a search. Controlled vocabularies solve the problems of homographs, synonyms and polysemes by a bijection between concepts and preferred terms. In short, controlled vocabularies reduce unwanted ambiguity inherent in normal human languages where the same concept can be given different names and ensure consistency.

For example, in the Library of Congress Subject Headings (a subject heading system that uses a controlled vocabulary), preferred terms—subject headings in this case—have to be chosen to handle choices between variant spellings of the same word (American versus British), choice among scientific and popular terms (cockroach versus Periplaneta americana), and choices between synonyms (automobile versus car), among other difficult issues.

Choices of preferred terms are based on the principles of user warrant (what terms users are likely to use), literary warrant (what terms are generally used in the literature and documents), and structural warrant (terms chosen by considering the structure, scope of the controlled vocabulary).

Controlled vocabularies also typically handle the problem of homographs with qualifiers. For example, the term pool has to be qualified to refer to either swimming pool or the game pool to ensure that each preferred term or heading refers to only one concept.

=== Types used in libraries ===
There are two main kinds of controlled vocabulary tools used in libraries: subject headings and thesauri. While the differences between the two are diminishing, there are still some minor differences:

- Historically, subject headings were designed to describe books in library catalogs by catalogers while thesauri were used by indexers to apply index terms to documents and articles.
- Subject headings tend to be broader in scope describing whole books, while thesauri tend to be more specialized covering very specific disciplines.
- Because of the card catalog system, subject headings tend to have terms that are in indirect order (though with the rise of automated systems this is being removed), while thesaurus terms are always in direct order.
- Subject headings tend to use more pre-coordination of terms such that the designer of the controlled vocabulary will combine various concepts together to form one preferred subject heading. (e.g., children and terrorism) while thesauri tend to use singular direct terms. Thesauri list not only equivalent terms but also narrower, broader terms and related terms among various preferred and non-preferred (but potentially synonymous) terms, while historically most subject headings did not. For example, the Library of Congress Subject Heading itself did not have much syndetic structure until 1943, and it was not until 1985 when it began to adopt the thesauri type term "Broader term" and "Narrow term".

The terms are chosen and organized by trained professionals (including librarians and information scientists) who possess expertise in the subject area. Controlled vocabulary terms can accurately describe what a given document is actually about, even if the terms themselves do not occur within the document's text. Well known subject heading systems include the Library of Congress system, Medical Subject Headings (MeSH) created by the United States National Library of Medicine, and Sears. Well known thesauri include the Art and Architecture Thesaurus and the ERIC Thesaurus.

When selecting terms for a controlled vocabulary, the designer has to consider the specificity of the term chosen, whether to use direct entry, inter consistency and stability of the language.

Lastly the amount of pre-coordination (in which case the degree of enumeration versus synthesis becomes an issue) and post-coordination in the system is another important issue. Controlled vocabulary elements (terms/phrases) employed as tags, to aid in the content identification process of documents, or other information system entities (e.g. DBMS, Web Services) qualifies as metadata.

== Indexing languages ==
There are three main types of indexing languages.

- Controlled indexing language – only approved terms can be used by the indexer to describe the document
- Natural language indexing language – any term from the document in question can be used to describe the document
- Free indexing language – any term (not only from the document) can be used to describe the document

When indexing a document, the indexer also has to choose the level of indexing exhaustivity, the level of detail in which the document is described. For example, using low indexing exhaustivity, minor aspects of the work will not be described with index terms. In general the higher the indexing exhaustivity, the more terms indexed for each document.

In recent years free text search as a means of access to documents has become popular. This involves using natural language indexing with an indexing exhaustively set to maximum (every word in the text is indexed). These methods have been compared in some studies, such as the 2007 article, "A Comparative Evaluation of Full-text, Concept-based, and Context-sensitive Search".

=== Advantages ===
Controlled vocabularies are often claimed to improve the accuracy of free text searching, such as to reduce irrelevant items in the retrieval list. These irrelevant items (false positives) are often caused by the inherent ambiguity of natural language. Take the English word football for example. Football is the name given to a number of different team sports. Worldwide the most popular of these team sports is association football, which also happens to be called soccer in several countries. The word football is also applied to rugby football (rugby union and rugby league), American football, Australian rules football, Gaelic football, and Canadian football. A search for football therefore will retrieve documents that are about several completely different sports. Controlled vocabulary solves this problem by tagging the documents in such a way that the ambiguities are eliminated.

Compared to free text searching, the use of a controlled vocabulary can dramatically increase the performance of an information retrieval system, if performance is measured by precision (the percentage of documents in the retrieval list that are actually relevant to the search topic).

In some cases controlled vocabulary can enhance recall as well, because unlike natural language schemes, once the correct preferred term is searched, there is no need to search for other terms that might be synonyms of that term.

=== Disadvantages ===
A controlled vocabulary search may lead to unsatisfactory recall, in that it will fail to retrieve some documents that are actually relevant to the search question.

This is particularly problematic when the search question involves terms that are sufficiently tangential to the subject area such that the indexer might have decided to tag it using a different term (but the searcher might consider the same). Essentially, this can be avoided only by an experienced user of controlled vocabulary whose understanding of the vocabulary coincides with that of the indexer.

Another possibility is that the article is just not tagged by the indexer because indexing exhaustivity is low. For example, an article might mention football as a secondary focus, and the indexer might decide not to tag it with "football" because it is not important enough compared to the main focus. But it turns out that for the searcher that article is relevant and hence recall fails. A free text search would automatically pick up that article regardless.

On the other hand, free text searches have high exhaustivity (every word is searched) so although it has much lower precision, it has potential for high recall as long as the searcher overcome the problem of synonyms by entering every combination.

Controlled vocabularies may become outdated rapidly in fast developing fields of knowledge, unless the preferred terms are updated regularly. Even in an ideal scenario, a controlled vocabulary is often less specific than the words of the text itself. Indexers trying to choose the appropriate index terms might misinterpret the author, while this precise problem is not a factor in a free text, as it uses the author's own words.

The use of controlled vocabularies can be costly compared to free text searches because human experts or expensive automated systems are necessary to index each entry. Furthermore, the user has to be familiar with the controlled vocabulary scheme to make best use of the system. But as already mentioned, the control of synonyms, homographs can help increase precision.

Numerous methodologies have been developed to assist in the creation of controlled vocabularies, including faceted classification, which enables a given data record or document to be described in multiple ways.

Word choice in chosen vocabularies is not neutral, and the indexer must carefully consider the ethics of their word choices. For example, traditionally colonialist terms have often been the preferred terms in chosen vocabularies when discussing First Nations issues, which has caused controversy.

== Applications ==
Controlled vocabularies, such as the Library of Congress Subject Headings, are an essential component of bibliography, the study and classification of books. They were initially developed in library and information science. In the 1950s, government agencies began to develop controlled vocabularies for the burgeoning journal literature in specialized fields; an example is the Medical Subject Headings (MeSH) developed by the U.S. National Library of Medicine. Subsequently, for-profit firms (called Abstracting and indexing services) emerged to index the fast-growing literature in every field of knowledge. In the 1960s, an online bibliographic database industry developed based on dialup X.25 networking. These services were seldom made available to the public because they were difficult to use; specialist librarians called search intermediaries handled the searching job. In the 1980s, the first full text databases appeared; these databases contain the full text of the index articles as well as the bibliographic information. Online bibliographic databases have migrated to the Internet and are now publicly available; however, most are proprietary and can be expensive to use. Students enrolled in colleges and universities may be able to access some of these services without charge; some of these services may be accessible without charge at a public library.

=== Technical communication ===
In large organizations, controlled vocabularies may be introduced to improve technical communication. The use of controlled vocabulary ensures that everyone is using the same word to mean the same thing. This consistency of terms is one of the most important concepts in technical writing and knowledge management, where effort is expended to use the same word throughout a document or organization instead of slightly different ones to refer to the same thing.

=== Semantic web and structured data ===
Web searching could be dramatically improved by the development of a controlled vocabulary for describing Web pages; the use of such a vocabulary could culminate in a Semantic Web, in which the content of Web pages is described using a machine-readable metadata scheme. One of the first proposals for such a scheme is the Dublin Core Initiative. An example of a controlled vocabulary which is usable for indexing web pages is PSH.

It is unlikely that a single metadata scheme will ever succeed in describing the content of the entire Web. To create a Semantic Web, it may be necessary to draw from two or more metadata systems to describe a Web page's contents. The eXchangeable Faceted Metadata Language (XFML) is designed to enable controlled vocabulary creators to publish and share metadata systems. XFML is designed on faceted classification principles.

Controlled vocabularies of the Semantic Web define the concepts and relationships (terms) used to describe a field of interest or area of concern. For instance, to declare a person in a machine-readable format, a vocabulary is needed that has the formal definition of "Person", such as the Friend of a Friend (FOAF) vocabulary, which has a Person class that defines typical properties of a person including, but not limited to, name, honorific prefix, affiliation, email address, and homepage, or the Person vocabulary of Schema.org. Similarly, a book can be described using the Book vocabulary of Schema.org and general publication terms from the Dublin Core vocabulary, an event with the Event vocabulary of Schema.org, and so on.

To use machine-readable terms from any controlled vocabulary, web designers can choose from a variety of annotation formats, including RDFa, HTML5 Microdata, or JSON-LD in the markup, or RDF serializations (RDF/XML, Turtle, N3, TriG, TriX) in external files.

== See also ==
- Authority control – Unique headings used for bibliographic information
- Controlled natural language – Subset of a natural language
- Defining vocabulary – List of words used by lexicographers to write dictionary definitions
- IMS Vocabulary Definition Exchange – Mark-up language – or grammar – for controlled vocabularies developed by IMS Global
- Named-entity recognition – Extraction of named entity mentions in unstructured text into pre-defined categories
- Nomenclature – System of names or terms in a particular field of arts or sciences
- Ontology (computer science) – Specification of a conceptualization
- Terminology – Academic discipline studying terms and their general uses
- Universal Data Element Framework
- Vocabulary-based transformation – Transformation aided by semantic equivalence statements within a controlled vocabulary.
