= Gabriel Nadales =

American activist

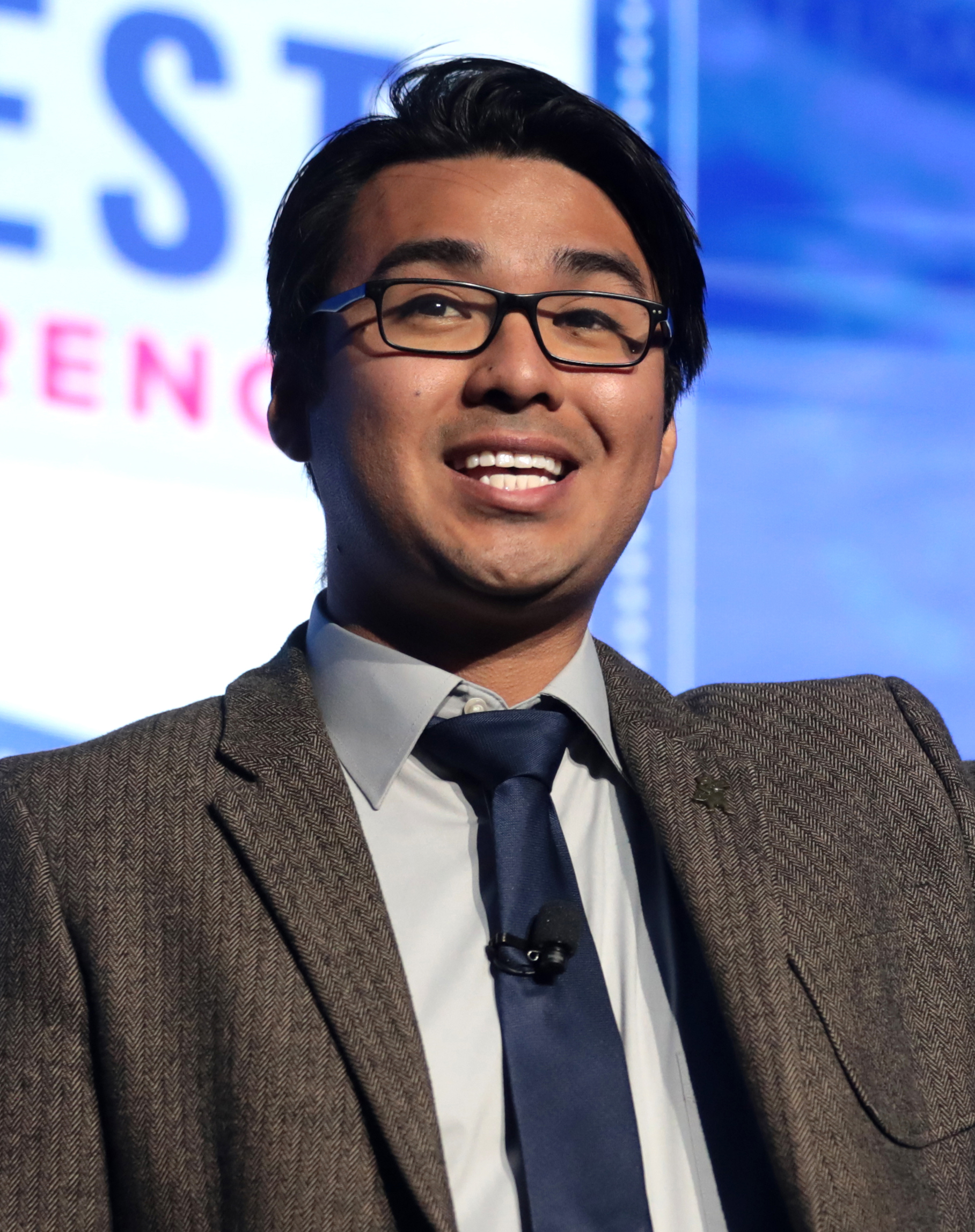
- Occupation: Political activist
- Movement: Conservatism; Libertarianism; Leftism; Antifa (United States) (formerly)

Gabriel Nadales is a conservative and libertarian activist who claims to have formerly been an Antifascist activist. He is currently the National Director for the pro-American organization Our America.

Gabe claimed he was a member of Antifascist action and to have attended several rallies and counter protest since 2008. In 2016, Gabe was nominated for the Network of enlightened Women Gentleman of the Year Under 30 award.

== Activism ==
From 2011 to 2012 17-year-old Gabriel Nadales participated in activities with a loose group who labeled themselves "Antifa." In November 2011 Nadales participated in Occupy Wall Street" protests, "before Antifa came to any prominence." Nadales wore black masks but, he states, "never personally engaged in any violence where he hurt another person. [He] was a kid back then. Many people who wore black masks at the Occupy protests did not act violently. At the very least, [his participation helped provide] cover for a few people who did commit some types of violence/direct criminal activity" and the black masked, nonviolent crowd provided cover when they stepped back "into the herd." He stopped going to protests in 2012 (as a 17-year-old minor) "because he realized it wasn't for him."

That fall, during his senior year of high school, he became interested in economics, Libertarianism and Conservatism, and stopped protesting because he realized the "Antifa" group he had connected with "were not actually interested in Antifascism, but wanted to fight people they didn't like."

Years later, he admitted to his father that he had stolen a bike and smashed a McDonald's window with a rock in protest of the corporation, and "[he] hated America so much that [he] refused to stand for the Pledge of Allegiance.” In 2013 Nadales entered Citrus College. He met Adam Weinberg of the Leadership Institute, who talked him into joining a new chapter of Young Americans for Liberty, whose mission is to expand libertarian and improve conservative activism on campuses. In 2014, the president of the Citrus College Young Americans for Liberty chapter, Vincenzo Sinapi-Riddle, with legal funding from the Foundation of Individual Rights in Education sued the school alleging several constitutional violations.

The lawsuit resulted in Citrus College slightly altering campus free-speech policies. It would not longer be necessary for an administrator to approve student flyers before campus distribution, and the campus "free-speech zone" would be expanded from a designated area in the center of campus to a larger footprint. Campus exceptions: all indoor areas, locations where activities would cause a fire hazard or restrict access rights to buildings, and all times when free speech disrupts normal educational processes. The college was ordered to pay $110,000 in legal fees to the filers of the lawsuit. An additional attempt by Gabriel Nadales & FIRE to file a resolution to force rescinding of all free speech policies on all California Community College Campuses failed.

November 14, 2019, as a conservative activist, Gabriel Nadales delivered a speech titled “Behind the Black Mask” in Reavis Hall at NIU, hosted by Young Americans for Liberty. He publicly denounced "Antifascism" and stated that it is a violent organization.

November 20, 2019, Turning Point USA's Emerson chapter hosted Nadales, who called for open dialogue across the political aisle and a breakdown of America's left-wing "conservative caricature."

In 2019, Nadales was (according to his autobiography) invited to the White House by the Trump administration to witness the signing of an executive order meant to promote free speech on college campuses.

Also in 2019, Nadales claimed that Antifa is "trying to hurt" and "harass" and called for the movement to be labeled a "Domestic Terrorism" threat.

In June 2020, on The Ingraham Angle show on Fox News, Nadales responded to U.S. Representative Jerry Nadler's claim that Antifa is an "imaginary" group, saying "That's just false" and "the protests I attended ... weren't imaginary."

== Books ==
Nadales is the author of Behind the Black Mask: My Time as an Antifa Activist published by the Post Hill Press in 2020. Also in 2020, Nadales contributed to Unmasking Antifa: Five Perspectives on a Growing Threat, which was published by Center for Security Policy.
