= Girls Gone Wild =

Girls Gone Wild or Girl Gone Wild may refer to:

- Girls Gone Wild, a 1929 film produced and released by Fox Film Corporation
- Girls Gone Wild (franchise), a pornographic entertainment franchise, 1997
- "Girls Gone Wild", a song by Baby Bash
- "Girls Gone Wild", a song by Captain Ahab
- "Girls Gone Wild", a song by DJ Antoine
- "Girls Gone Wild", a song by Inner Circle from The Best of Inner Circle
- "Girls Gone Wild", a song by Jagged Edge
- "Girls Gone Wild", a song by JT
- "Girls Gone Wild", a song by Lee Kernaghan from the album Planet Country
- "Girls Gone Wild", a 2006 song by Ludacris from the album Release Therapy
- "Girl Gone Wild", a song by Madonna
- Girls Gone Mild, a 2007 book on self-respect by Wendy Shalit

== See also ==
- Gone Wild (disambiguation)
