= Complaints of Khakheperraseneb =

Ancient Egyptian text

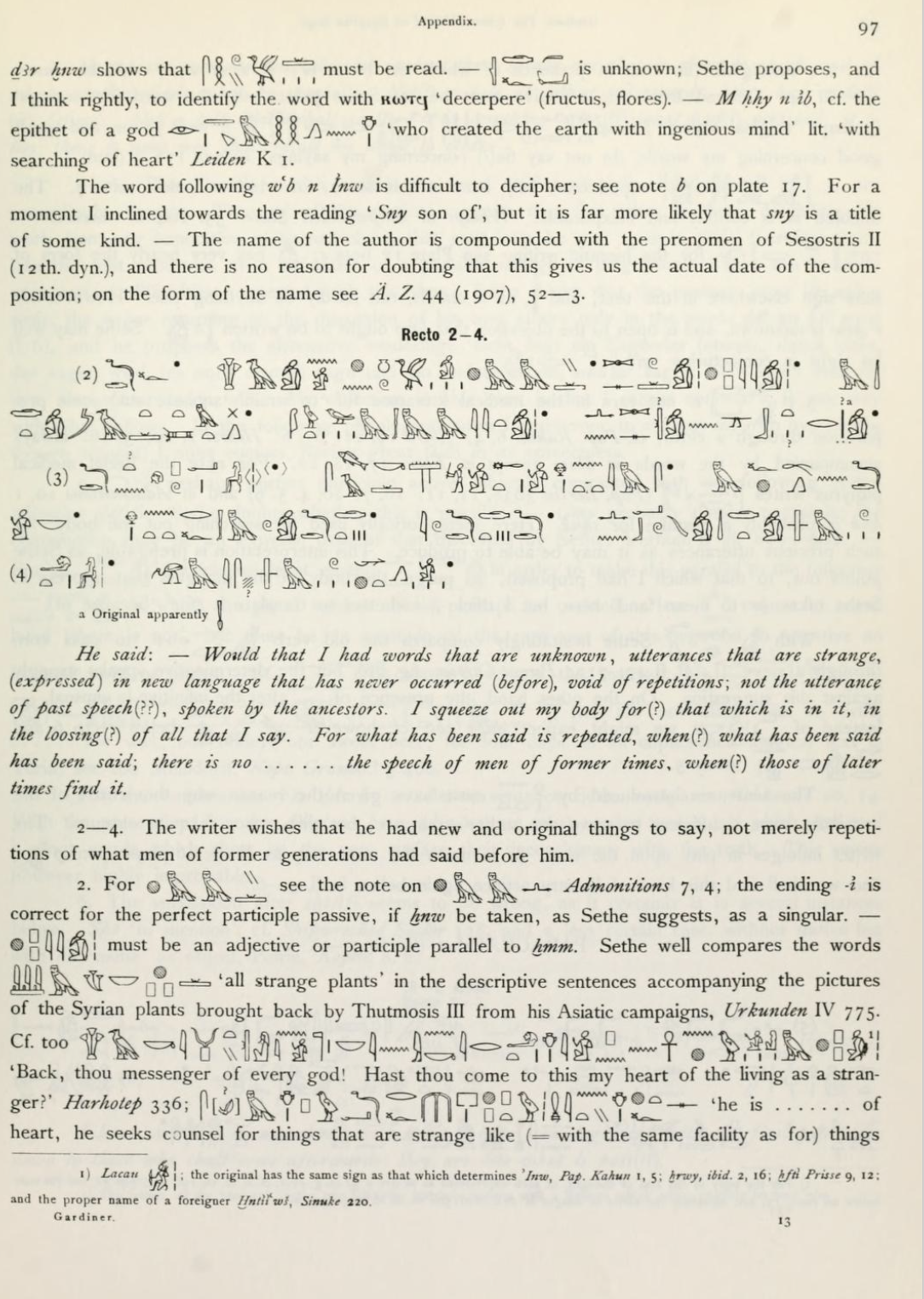
From Alan Gardiner's appendix on the Complaints of Kheperraseneb, 1909

The "Complaints of Khakheperraseneb", also called the "Lamentations of Khakheperraseneb", is an ancient Egyptian text. Our earliest extant copy of the work is likely dated between 1800 and 1650 BCE. Its outer bound is 1250 since writing tablets of this sort disappear from the archaeological record by that time but the style of script suggests a date much earlier by a margin of at least several centuries. It pairs with other literature of the second Egyptian Dark Age, and shows a particular affinity with the Ipuwer Papyrus.

“My surprise and pleasure were great when many of the rare words known to me from the Admonitions [of Ipuwer] made their appearance one by one, as I advanced with the transcription; it seemed almost as though this new text had been written for the express purpose of illustrating my Leiden papyrus! Nor were the resemblances confined to the vocabular)' alone: the latter parts contain a pessimistic description of the world that vividly recalled the descriptive portions of the Admonitions. At the same time I noted differences both in the form and in the matter which made a comparison with the Admonitions particularly instructive; and I soon became aware of an especially important point about the writing board, namely that its date can be fixed with certainty. From every point of view therefore it seemed advisable to publish this new document as an Appendix to my work on Pap. Leiden 344. ”

It begins:

Would that I had phrases unknown, sayings unused, new words not yet set down, free of repetitions, devoid of the phrases in that familiar language which the ancestors spoke.

And continues:

A speaker has not spoken who says what remains unspoken.

At length, the author explains the cause of this strange new desire:

I contemplate what has happened, the conditions which have come about throughout the land. Transformations are taking place; it is not like last year...The Lords of Silence (i.e. the dead) are disturbed. (When) morning comes each day, the face recoils at what has happened.

Regardless of whether K.’s document is reflective of the actual words of this figure, Khakheperrasedeb, whose shadow is so long that it stretches (thinly but distinctly) over records spaced out across two milliena, or if it is otherwise the pseudepigraphic production of a student working during the years in which the Middle Kingdom collapsed (which would be equally unique and without other distinct examples in the inventory of contemporaneous artifacts available to compare it with) then this text may be regarded as the earliest verbally articulated expression of the desire to think differently—to rise above traditional norms and break out beyond the frontiers of accustomed knowledge.

== Description and dating ==
Alan Gardiner's description of the tablet, never significantly revised in subsequent scholarship, reads as follows in a section of its introduction of the artifact into the inventory:

Brit. Mus. 5645 is a wooden board 55 cm. long and 29 cm. high, covered on both sides with a coating of stucco. The stucco is laid upon the wood by means of a coarse network of string, which was attached to the board with some adhesive matter. In the middle of the right hand side is a small hole, which made it possible for the board to be suspended from a wall. The text consists of four paragraphs of varying length, three of which are upon the recto; the verso contains the fourth paragraph, and, lower down, two lines of larger writing that have nothing to do with the preceding literary text. The entire board is covered with dirty reddish marks which may very easily be confused with the red verse-points, and all the more so since the latter have become very pale in colour. The writing is in places quite faint, and the task of decipherment was in consequence not always very easy. The hieratic hand is perhaps more nearly related to that of the Westcar papyrus* than to any other well-known text; however I am inclined to assign it to a somewhat later date...

*Re: The Westcar Papyrus (P. Berlin 3033) is presently dated 18th-16th century BCE. At the time that Gardiner was writing (1909), P. Berlin 3033 was dated to the earlier years of that timespan. Gardiner therefore indicates: sometime probably later than the first half of the century running from 1800-1701BCE. Notably, the Shepeherd King dynasty begins to get traction sometime around 1750BCE as the 13th dynasty is still vying for control but dying out.

This writing board is currently held in the British Museum. The date of its inscription is thought to be near the collapse of central control as new rulers from foreign lands are encroaching on the traditional pharaonic power structure—from the end of the 12th dynasty, through the 13th.

Context of the Date

The 14th dynasty is known as the period of the shepherd kings or foreign rulers (re: Hyksos) beginning (roughly) with the ascension to leadership of Yakub-Har (otherwise dated to the end of Merneferre Ay's reign) and arriving at its spectacular climax with the fall of Avaris. To call it a pharaonic dynasty, as has been suggested by Dodson and others, is almost a misnomer since virtually all major conventions of Pharaonic rule and its halo of cultural production fall out of the record during this period.

At the very earliest, this document is from the end of the 12th dynasty (according to analysis of the text's grammar), at the latest likely date it is written at the beginning of the 14th dynasty—or in other words after the Second Intermediate Period has already begun.

This work dates, therefore, to some year during the dawning of a dark age in Egyptian history, from the perspective of conservative Pharaonic forces of Kemet (the 'black land' on the banks of the Nile and especially in Upper Egypt, as opposed to Deshret—the red land of desert wilderness beyond that narrow strait, and also of the environs roundabout the Nile Delta in Lower Egypt). It reflects upon the sclerotic conservativism of attitudes and available forms of cultural production in Egypt in the midst of their extinction at the end of the Middle Kingdom.

Implications of the Language

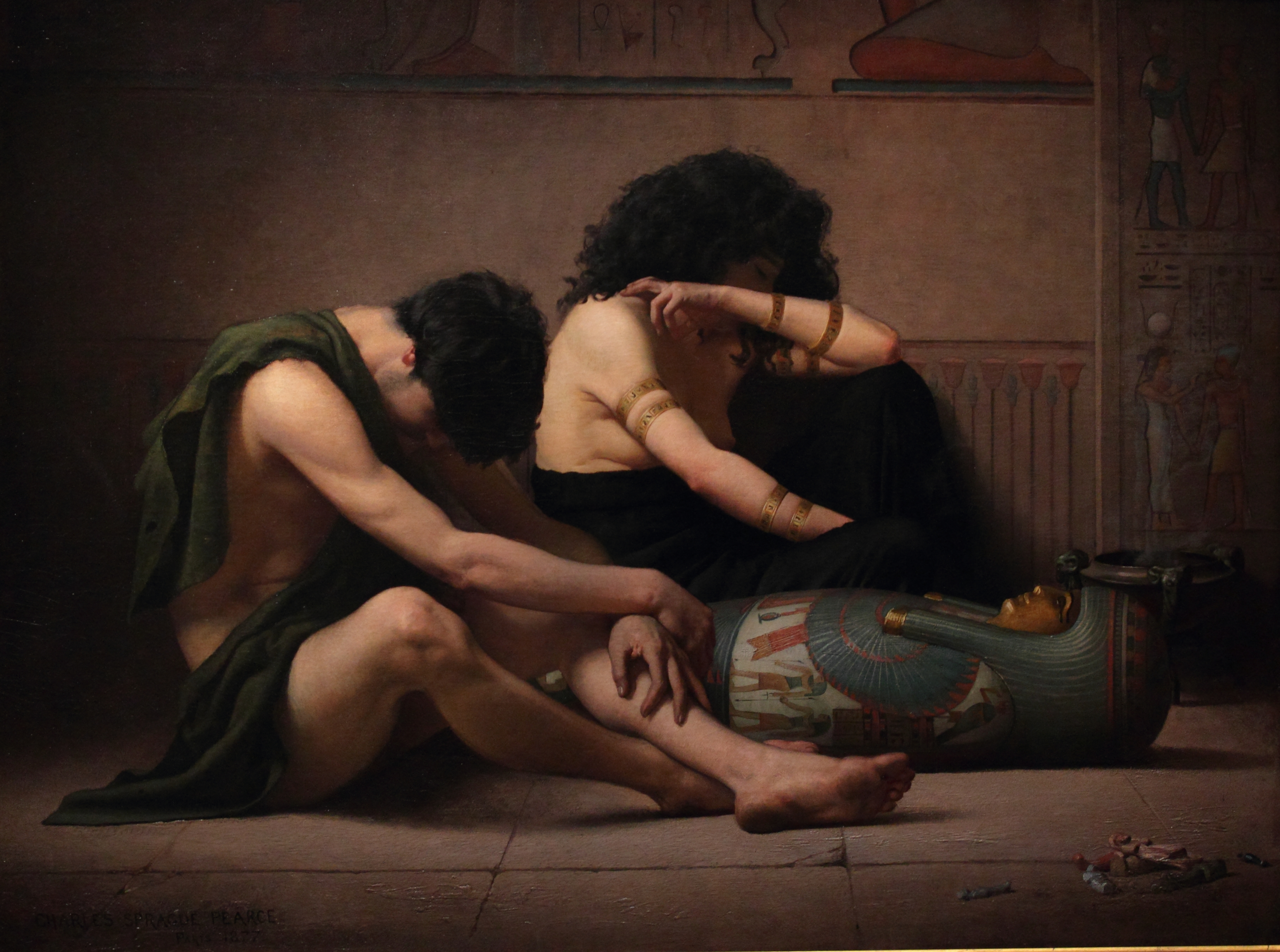
A 19th century European painterly representation of lamentations over the death of the firstborn, by Charles Sprague Pearce.

Alan Gardiner, in his initial presentation of the material, classes this text together with a later papyrus, The Admonitions of Ipuwer, as representative of the literature of Lamentations reflecting on the Second Intermediate Period.

"He had been struck by the number of philological similarities between the two texts and by the fact they both belong to that genre of pessimistic literature that includes such works as describe the dialogue between a man and his ba." One might think of the Egyptian ba as the voice that one hears in one's head when thinking; although these phenomenological categories were thought of differently in ancient Egypt, the comparison serves as an analogy.

Subsequent scholarship has not attempted to revise Gardiner's original judgment on this question.

== Translation of the text ==
A translation of the text drawn from the Egyptologist Gerald Kaddish and from his model in the original Gardiner publication appears below:

The compilation of old sayings, gleanings from maxims, the searching for phrases in racking the brain which the [?] priest of Heliopolis, Senys son, Kha-kheper-Rēr-senebu, called 'Ankhu, assembled.

He says: "Would that I had (some) phrases which were unknown," sayings that were unusual (or) new words not yet been used, free of repetition's devoid of the phrases of that familiar language which the ancestors spoke. I have drained my body' because of what was in it, to get rid of all that I have said (before),' inasmuch as it is indeed (mere) repetition of what has been said repeatedly.

What has been said is said."One cannot boast of the words of the ancestors or, indeed, of what subsequent generations discovered." A speaker has not (yet) spoken who says what is yet to be spoken."What is found of another's, that is what will be said,' without adding the statement afterwards: '"What they [i.e. the ancestors] did previously', without words which they [i.e. the modern copiers] had conceived of saying." It is courting ruin! It is falsehood! There is no one who will recall such a person's name to others.

I have said these things on the basis of what I have seen in the records of the past] from the first generation down through those which came thereafter. "These things have outlived what is past." Would indeed that I knew something others did not know, things which have not been repeated. (Then) I would express them, (so that) my heart might answer me. I would explain to it about my suffering and (thereby) shift to it the burden which is upon my back, (namely) the words which afflict me? I would relate to it the things which I suffer on account of it. (Then) I would (be able to) say: 'Ah!' because of my relief.

I contemplate what has happened, the conditions which have come about throughout the land. Transformations are taking place; it is not like last year. One year is more troublesome than the other. The land is breaking up, becoming a wasteland to me, his being made as ... "Justice has been cast aside, wrong-doing is (even) in the council-chamber. The plans of the gods are interfered with; their ordinances are neglected. The land is in continuous distress." Mourning is everywhere. The towns and nomes are in grief in All persons alike suffer wrongs. (As for) reverence, backs are turned to it. The Lords of Silence (i.e. the dead) are disturbed. (When) morning comes each day, the face recoils at what has happened."

I (must) speak about these things. My body is weighed down. "I am distressed because of my heart and it is painful to keep silent about it." Another heart would be bowed down and broken. "Now a brave heart, in evil circumstances, is a companion for its possessor." Would that I had such a heart, able to suffer, then I would (be able to) rely upon it. I would load it down with words of misery. I would thrust on to it my suffering. He says to his heart: 'Come, then, my heart, that I may speak to you, that you might answer for me my statements, that you might explain to me that which pervades the land, that that which was bright, has been cast down.

I contemplate what has happened. Misery has been introduced nowadays.

(Such) tribulations have not occurred since the ancestors. Everyone is silent on account of it. The entire land is thrown into a fit! No one is free from wrong-doing; all alike are commit [these outrages]. Hearts are sad. One who used to give commands is (now) one to whom commands are given; both are content. One awakens to these things daily; hearts cannot put them aside. The conditions from yesterday are the same today because of the transpiring of many things, because of cruelty (?) There is no man so wise that he understands it. None are (so) angry that he will speak out. One awakens to pain every day. Long and hard in my suffering. There is no strength for the wretched man to protect him from the strong man. It is painful to remain silent about what is heard. It is misery to reply to the ignorant man. To criticize a statement breeds enmity. The heart does not accept truth. A reply to a statement is not. A man's only interest is (in) his own words. All men put their trust in crooked (things). Correctness of speech is abandoned. I speak to you, O my heart, that you might answer me. A heart which is does not remain silent. Behold, the due of a servant is the same as a lord, things are burdensome because of you.

The author's psychic struggle here is notable, as ancient Egypt was an intensely conservative society where novelty and reinvention of old standards was considered an abomination. Both sides of this problem—the conservative impulse, and the desire to push against it to say something new for which there are not yet words—stand out in the text.

== Egyptian Lamentations: Overview and Comparison ==
Relationship to the Egyptian Literature of Lamentions, and to the Ipuwer Papyrus in particular

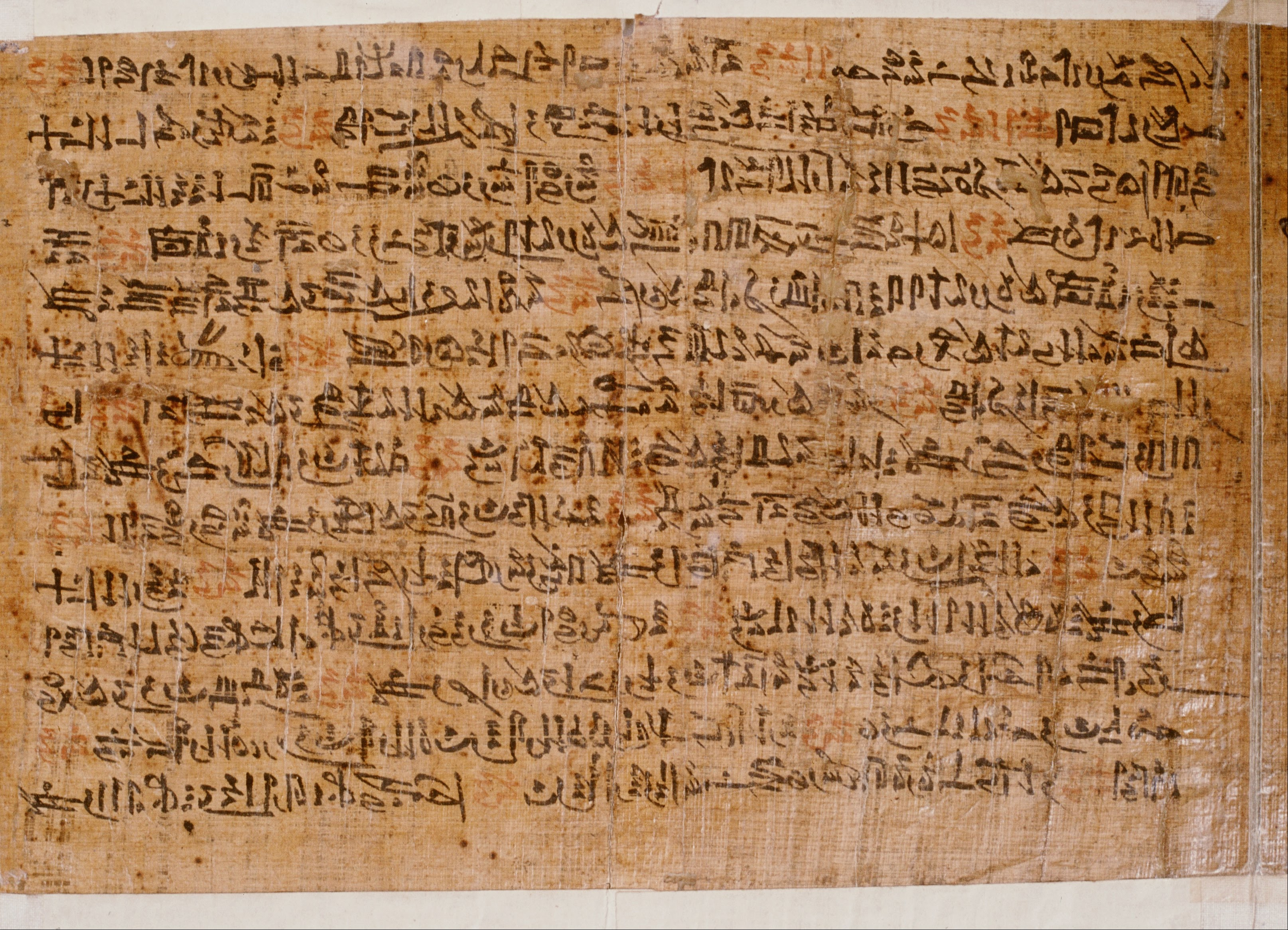
The Ipuwer Papyrus, c. 1250BCE mentions the Nile river turning to blood, slaves dancing in jewelry stolen from their masters, the flocks stolen from Egyptians by their servants and other details of commonly associated with the Biblical Exodus.

The fact that the only fragment by Khakheperrasedeb that remains to us in the record is a mere twenty lines in length suggests that the writing board is a short snippet from a much larger original work. It would be hard to believe that, “K.[hakheperrasedeb]’s reputation should have rested on so slender a foundation,” according to Egyptologist Gerald Kaddish. An author as revered in Egyptian records as K.[hakheperrasenab] either must have had several better known and more complete compositions associated with his name or, alternatively, this lamentation was originally the beginning of an elaborate epic whose full sweep and story astounded future Egyptians looking back on the work.

Without stating any positive belief or certainty in the proposition, Gardiner's theory of the textual relationship between the writing board and the Admonitions strongly implies that he thinks the earlier fragment is an introduction to a text very much like the one appearing under the name of Ipuwer which appear as a late adaptation of the former work begun on the writing board.

This is a constrained way of saying (on Gardiner's part): The relationship between the language in K.’s text with the longer story appearing under the name of Ipuwer is so strong that it is possible to read the later text as a late version or variation on the larger text that is imagined to follow K.’s introduction. Though there is no certain suggestion that this is literally true, it is philologically justified to think about the two texts in this way.

Overview of the Tradition of Lamentations

Other candidates included in the literature of Egyptian lamentation during the Middle and New Kingdoms period include the Tale of Khunipu, a Dialogue between a Man and his Ba, the Story of a Fowler, Tale of Neferpesdjet, the Lament of Sassobek, and (arguably) the Prophecy of Neferti from the cycle of tales in the Westcar Papyrus. There are echoes back and forth throughout all these tales (otherwise they would not be associated with each other as a literature).

For example: both the laments of the Fowler and those appearing in the story of Sassobek are narrated by a man thrown in jail. Both the tale of Khunipu (the only complete and unfragmented lamentation) and Neherpesdjet are told from the perspective of marginal figures trying to live by hunting game—an avocation of the starving only reverted to during famines, from an ancient Egyptian perspective). The prophecy of Neferti and K.’s complaints have a similar style of handwriting indicating they share the same period of composition, and appear within the same pedagogical regime (at least as far as handwriting is concerned). The dialogue of a man and his Ba share in common with both K. and Ipuwer their pessimistic tone, as well as the otherwise unaccustomed conceit of a man thinking to himself rather than by reference or with his thoughts recounted merely by recording his speech.

Special Identity of the Lamentations of Ipuwer & Khakheperraseneb

But none of these texts are as linguistically close to one another as Ipuwer and K.’s laments. And, notably, at the level of the phrases both Ipuwer and K. share images and sentiments that find their complement or reflection book of Exodus and, to a lesser degree of distinction, with some turns of phrase heard in Hebrew prophecy.

Context of the Lamentations of Ipuwer

Ipuwer's text is a copy or recollection of an old tale from the Dark Ages in Egypt—he wrote this copy down in c. 1250BCE shortly after the disruptive period of the Amarna heresy and about a century prior to the events that brought the New Kingdom (and thus the classical Pharaonic model of ancient Egypt, running from the Old Kingdom through the new) to a permanent end. The copyist known as K., meanwhile back in c. 1750, seems to have been writing about contemporary events in the voice of a legendary figure, or—just possibly—to be developing an old story actually available in the written records that was either attributed to or otherwise literally inscribed by the historical figure of Khakheperraseneb during an even earlier Dark Age (re: the first intermediate period).

There is also the possibility that the historical Khakheperrasedeb was not a writer at all but an administrator or vizier of special and legendary notoriety, and that his later reputation as an author in the early centuries of the current era is entirely due to a genre or tradition of pseudepigraphic writings, similar to the student writing board from which this sample text has been recovered, with all other members of the genre now extinct apart from (just possibly) the other candidate above-mentioned: the Ipuwer Papyrus.

The tendency in our inventory of lamentations in Egypt, in general, consists of texts written down much later than the events which they describe. The archaic vocabulary in many of these texts justifies to some extent the assumption of their even greater antiquity. But in general we see lamentations from older Dark Ages appearing at moments when Egyptian hegemony is threatened. Whether these are 1. exact copies of older texts, or 2. elaborations reflecting contemporary circumstances or 3. (most plausibly) whether this literature represents a combination of repetition and elaboration referring to older texts and their oral tradition within the event horizon of novel threats to Egyptian society in the time when they are actually inscribed, must remain an open question.

In the eventuality that either of these latter two interpretations of the genre accurately reflects the occasion and circumstance for composing a lamentation, then these artifacts amount to a form of historical screen memory covering over contemporary crises which are difficult or impossible to describe according to conventional modes of representation in Egyptian culture while also marking the presence of such pressures in the real-time background of their composition. In which case, K.’s lamentation—however fragmentary and provisional—suggests itself as the ne plus ultra of the whole genre, distilling the essence of the form.

Eccentricity of the Prophecy of Neferty in relation to K.’s Complaints

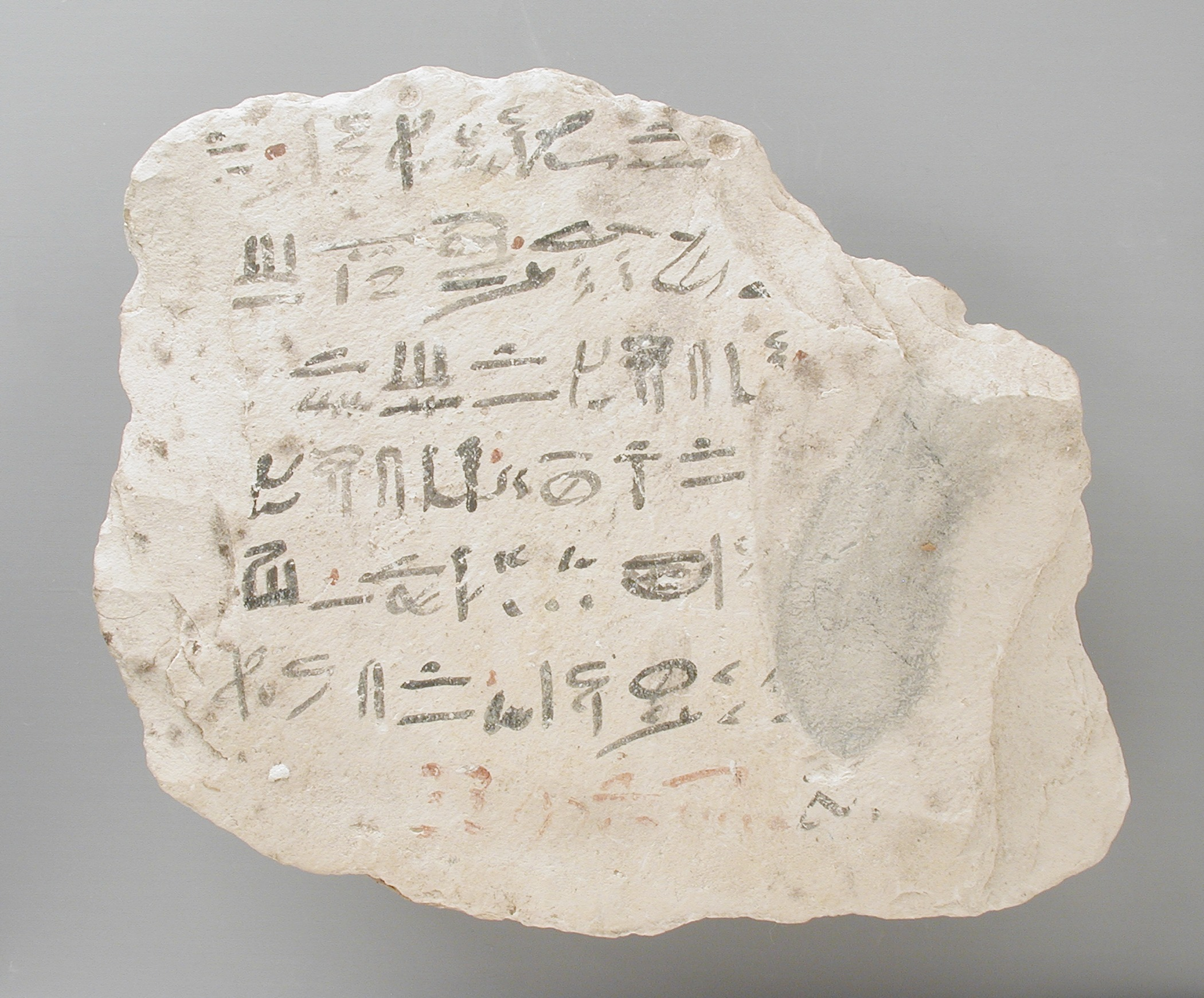
Ostrakon with fragment of the Prophecy of Neferti at LACMA (M.80.203.196) A complete version of this lamentation (Cairo 25224 and BM 5647)is held in St. Petersburg at the Hermitage Museum

In the same way that K.’s Complaints and the lamentations of Ipuwer are the most intimately bound exemplars amongst the literature of Egyptian lamentation, the prophecy of Neferty and the Complaints of Khakheperrasedeb might be said to represent the most extreme polarity within the inventory of lamentation. Neferty's language is most primitive and stereotyped but its text is the most complete. K.s complaint is in many respects the most unusual relative to the tendencies of Egyptian prose, and its text—unless speculatively joined to Ipuwer's—is the most fragmentary, consisting of only a single scrap (which is likely but uncertainly assumed to be the beginning of a prologue). A single but important variable marks an affinity between K. complaint and the prophecy: the hieratic hand in which both are written indicates their chronological proximity.

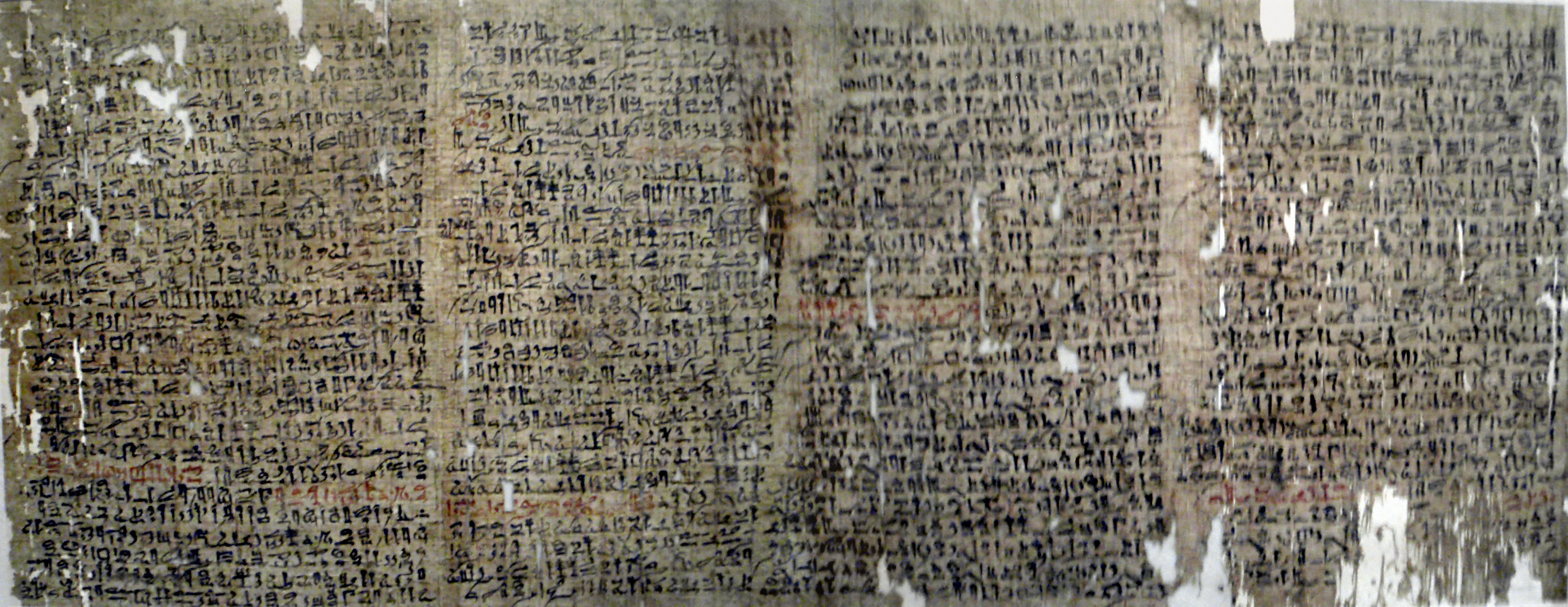
The Westcar Papyrus, c.1750-1650BCE

The prophecy of Neferty stands alone amongst our exemplars as a possible exception to the above-mentioned dynamics of lamentation as a pseudepigraphic genre of reflection in times of disaster, since its narrative contains a redemptive conclusion to the action in the arc of its lament: order is restored before the story comes to an end. This prophecy comes closer to conforming to more typical historical documents in the Egyptian records, though separated from the events it relates by roughly five centuries. It is not a chronicle, like the Papyrus Harris (to cite a late exemplar) but neither is it not clearly or completely mythological or purely liturgical in its character either.

But again this is a singular case in the records, an exception to the rule. A further the analysis of Khakheperrasedeb's reputation as an historical figure further illuminates the problem, touching upon Neferty's place within the genre as a whole.

== Reputation of Khakheperraseneb ==
Inscription at Saqqara

Khakheperraseneb's name appears in an inscription on a wall in Saqqara along with other great figures of a very distant past: Kheti (either a vizier or treasurer before the Second Intermediate period, c. 2100BCE), an even earlier figure called Kaires (a vizier during the 5th dynasty whose tomb has been recently discovered, c. 2400BCE), and Imhotep (c. 2800, vizier to Djoser, and architect of the early pyramids). Notably this inscription at Saqqara is etched sometime during the 19th dynasty (1295-1186BCE) near the end of the New Kingdom and each of these figures appear to have been viziers to Pharaohs so ancient that by the time they appear on the wall at Saqqara they are all but legendary. Notable also, in itself without respect to the early dates out of which these figures emerge, is that all of them are apparently viziers or chancellors—not Pharaohs but administrative rulers. This rather unusual, given the general inclination of Egyptian wall-carvings appearing at cult-sites towards deifying pharaohs and underplaying the contributions of the Pharaoh's staff and Personnel. Most of what we know about other figures in Egyptian history come from their own tomb carvings not from sites of the royal cult.

Khakheperraseneb is also remembered by the Egyptians as a formidable scribe in papyrus Chester-Beatty IV from the 19th Dynasty.

Appearance in a Canon of “Immortal” Egyptian Authors in the Chester Beatty Papyrus

However, the list where Khakheperraseneb's name appears in the Beatty Papyrus seems very likely to have been copied from the wall in Saqqara, and then embellished with the names of several other writers from later periods. Or at any rate: the earlier list is contained in the latter only as an ancestor, so to speak. It is even possible, incidentally, that two of the names appearing in the Chester Beatty Papyrus are corrupted spellings of Akehnaten and Nefertiti (Aknoy and Nfry).

More parsimoniously, the Nefri referred to in the Beatty papyrus is the well-known prophetess whose oracles predicted the reestablisment of Egyptian unity after the disruption of some sort of antediluvian civil war. Here Nefry is associated not with any Akhnoy or Akhenaten but with a figure called Kheti. In this famous prophecy of Nefry, included in the Westcar papyrus and existing in many copies (one of which is complete and appears on two tablets), Nefry tells the story of Kheti's uprising—of the vizier who apparently usurped a part of the previous Pharaoh's dominion and seized lands around the Nile Delta (or the Deshret) disestablishing the unity of the realm. The prophecy predicts that he will later to be overthrown and the lands of upper and lower Egypt reunified. The relationship between Nefry's Kheti and the historical Khetis (including a particularly generous treasurer) is not fully understood, but the possibility of a relationship here is suggestive.

However this attribution (which certainly accounts in part for the appearance of Nefry's name in this context) does not provide context for the figure of Akhnoy who is paired with Nefry in the list appearing in the “Student’s Miscellany” (that is: it does not appear in the relevant section of the Chester Beatty Papyrus).

This lengthy hymn, at whose climax the list of Egypt's immortal authors appears, is an epistolary hymn of supplication (Re: hereafter referred to as "The Student's Miscellany") asking for a student to be admitted to an academy so that "his name may live forever amongst the other great authors of Egyptian history." To resort to anachronism, it could be described as an ancient, epic-length college admission essay (in this case, written by the parent of the candidate for admission). All this would seem prohibitive of the pairing of Aknoy and Nfry being Akehanten and Nefertiti (the Heretic Pharaoh's Queen). A pharaoh would not have to beg for his child to be admitted to an academy so that the author's son could learn the arts of writing and rhetoric. But here there is a texture of fine distinctions apparent in the whole flow of the Student Miscellany's text, tipping the scales back the other way: The tone of "The Student Miscellany" dismissal of traditional burial rites and its author's preference for finding other avenues into the afterlife (or otherwise into the good graces of the great deity referenced in the poem) speaks in favor of the possibility that there is, indeed, some kind of corrupted memory of the literature of the old Amarna Heresy—mostly demolished by damnatio memoriae, yet evidently trailing survivals that bleed into later Hebrew poetry—somehow echoing in these verses. Adding some weight to this reading of the text, is the fact that there are similarities of language and imagery in the Beatty text that recall, in a vulgarized and deeply déclassé sense, elements of the Hymn to the Aten: as all creatures worship the Aten and are fed by him in the old New Kingdom hymn, here in the later coptic-era bequest of The Student's Miscellany, all mortals desiring permanence beyond the grave who can't afford to build themselves a pyramid get themselves to the library to read the classics and try to rewrite them. The exhaustive capaciousness of the poem's stretch and the rhythm of its delivery, almost moreso than the content, brings forth the semblance between the Student Miscellany and the Hymn to the Aten.

Let it be remembered as we puzzle over this aporia in the inventory of references to Khakheperraseneb, that the copyist of the Beatty papyri lived in an era of Egyptian history when Christianity briefly became predominant in Egypt, where Judaism was already long-established, and where the worship of the old gods of Egypt had died out or been subsumed in syncretism long ago, such that much of this late Coptic papyri is devoted to Biblical subjects and to homilies. The promotion (or otherwise the imitation) of Akhenaten's residues might have been especially selected for in this context.

The matter in question—whether or not we can believe these names are really the names of early authors from the most ancient Egyptian antiquity, and specifically whether the name Khakheperraseneb belongs among them for this reason—after all these considerations (all of which are further compounded by the gravely defective spelling and grammar of the Coptic author of the Beatty text and, even moreso, given that the date of composition is separated from the end of old Egypt with the extinction of the New Kingdom by almost fourteen hundred years), begins to slip past the perimeter of any effective or parsimonious judgment on these finer points of implication.

As such, the assertion that Khakheperraseneb was a scribe (as is clearly assumed in the Beatty Papyrus) may have originally connoted—in the ur-specimen where his name was inscribed on the wall at Saqqara during an earlier era—some great fame which had accrued to him during his tenure as an administrator of some sort during the Old Kingdom. Thereafter, it may only have been many centuries later, when some confusion amongst the copyists led to a misapprehension in which he began to be remembered as a writer rather than as a vizier.

A final option or consideration, however, remains—one that clarifies only when we return to the Saqqarra inscription and contemplate this list as if it were a lost pantheon.

All of these names are from the Old Kingdom, the deepest zone of Egyptian antiquity.

Recall that Imhotep is the ur-architect of the pyramids, that Kheti (very likely) refers to the most generous of all treasurers ever remembered to us in the Egyptian records—who poured out the coffers of the great and gave away the coin of the realm to the people. Remember that the tomb inscription of Kaires tells us that he was..."Pharaoh's only true friend," implying—almost—that he virtually ruled Egypt on the Pharaoh's behalf.

If Khakheperraseneb's accomplishments as a writer of the Old Kingdom were of such great stature that he really belongs on this list (or if he was—at least—the chosen figure onto which a special literary was projected during the Middle Kingdom) then the work (or works) representative of his production must have been very great indeed. They must have been remembered as some sort of great masterwork for the ages—something that, if all these speculative but plausible conditions were to be met—must have been later suppressed given that it is otherwise lost apart from these few remaining scraps that gesture back towards it in the eerie dawn of the old empire.

Otherwise we would never have learned of his reputation in this strange way, from fragments scattered over a period of almost two thousand years.

== Bibliography ==
- Assmann, Jan. "Cultural Memory and the Myth of the Axial Age." In The Axial Age and Its Consequences, edited by Bellah Robert N. and Joas Hans, 366–408. Cambridge, Massachusetts; London, England: Harvard University Press, 2012. JSTOR j.ctt2jbs61.18
- Bell, Barbara. "Climate and the History of Egypt: The Middle Kingdom." American Journal of Archaeology 79, no. 3 (1975): 223–69. doi:10.2307/503481
- Kadish, Gerald E. "British Museum Writing Board 5645: The Complaints of Kha-Kheper-Rē'-Senebu." The Journal of Egyptian Archaeology 59 (1973): 77–90. doi:10.2307/3856099
- Lichtheim, Miriam, and Antonio Loprieno. 2006. Ancient Egyptian Literature. Volume I, the Old and Middle Kingdoms. Berkeley, Calif.; London: University of California Press.
- Ockinga, Boyo G. "The Burden of Kha'kheperrē'sonbu." The Journal of Egyptian Archaeology 69 (1983): 88–95. doi:10.2307/3821439\
- Van de Mieroop, Marc. 2011. A History of Ancient Egypt. Chichester, West Sussex; Malden, MA: Wiley-Blackwell.
