= Network of enlightened Women =

Network of enlightened Women (NeW)
- Founded: 2004
- Founder: Karin Agness
- Type: Conservative college women's organization
- Website: http://enlightenedwomen.org/

The Network of enlightened Women (NeW) is an organization for culturally conservative women at American universities. Started as a book club at the University of Virginia in 2004, NeW seeks to cultivate "a community of conservative women and expands intellectual diversity on college campuses through its focus on education."

NeW members meet to discuss issues ranging from politics and gender to conservative principles. Since its founding, NeW has expanded to over 20 colleges campuses nationwide.

== Founding ==
NeW was founded in September 2004 by Karin Agness Lips as a book club at the University of Virginia (UVa). Agness Lips founded the club after finding the feminist environment at UVa hostile to conservative women.

== Activities ==
While NeW chapters continue to read books together to become better educated, their members also seek to engage their larger campus communities by hosting speakers, holding debates, promoting chivalrous behavior through a "Gentlemen’s Showcase," and challenging the controversial play The Vagina Monologues.

The national organization also hosts an annual national conference in Washington, DC each summer.

=== National conference ===
Each summer, NeW leaders, NeW supporters and those interested in learning more about NeW gather in Washington, DC for the annual NeW National Conference. The 2010 conference brought more than 60 women together, and Christina Hoff Sommers (author of Who Stole Feminism? How Women Have Betrayed Women and The War Against Boys: How Misguided Feminism Is Harming Our Young Men) was the keynote speaker. The Heritage Foundation's Insider Magazine praised the conference, and noted that NeW women are "hard at work... bringing intellectual diversity back to campus", commending NeW for "rescuing feminism from the feminists."

=== Gentlemen's Showcase ===
Each spring, NeW hosts the NeW Gentlemen’s Showcase, which is a national event recognizing and honoring gentlemen on college campuses. The event seeks to encourage mutual respect between the sexes on campuses. Nominees are submitted through Facebook and are voted on by students from all over the country. Some individual chapters also host their own college-wide contest.

In an op-ed in the Richmond Times-Dispatch, Agness discussed the Gentlemen's Showcase, concluding, "There are still gentlemen on college campuses. And with a little encouragement, there will be more. Instead of trying to change men on campus, we should seek to bring out the best in them. And this lesson applies to women as well."

=== The Vagina Monologues and V-Day ===
NeW has attracted attention for its campaign against the performance of The Vagina Monologues and the corresponding observance of V-Day. NeW members, including Agness, wrote articles criticizing Eve Ensler's play as vulgar, demeaning, and offensive, arguing that the explicit content and anatomical obsession of the play has made feminists "their own greatest enemy."

== Reception ==
NeW has been profiled in TIME, The Washington Times, Politico, More magazine, Townhall Magazine and many other media outlets. In October 2006, the comic strip Mallard Fillmore featured NeW twice.

NeW has been praised for equipping young women on campus to engage in intellectual discussions and for representing a view of women and feminism that has for too long been silenced or ignored on the collegiate level. Writing in The Washington Times, Rebecca Hagelin called NeW "feminine defenders" and notes the increased interest in the work done by NeW ladies on college campuses all over the country.

== NeW chapters ==
NeW has more than 50 chapters across the United States, including at the University of Virginia, University of South Florida, Cornell University, University of Florida, University of North Carolina at Chapel Hill, University of Kansas, and Ohio State University.

== Reading list ==
On the NeW website, the organization lists the following books as "suggested reading" for their book clubs:

- What Women Really Want
- Phyllis Schlafly and Grassroots Conservatism: A Woman’s Crusade
- What Our Mothers Didn’t Tell Us: Why Happiness Eludes the Modern Woman
- Letters to a Young Conservative
- Marriage: The Dream that Refuses to Die
- Domestic Tranquility: A Brief against Feminism
- Unprotected
- Power to the People
- The Politics of Prudence
- Politically Incorrect Guide to Women, Sex and Feminism
- Love & Economics: Why the Laissez-Faire Family Doesn’t Work
- Women Who Make the World Worse
- Taking Sex Differences Seriously
- It Takes a Family: Conservatism and the Common Good
- Feminist Fantasies
- The Good Girl Revolution
- A Return to Modesty: Discovering the Lost Virtue
- Who Stole Feminism?
- The War Against Boys
- Unhooked: How Young Women Pursue Sex, Delay Love and Lose at Both
- Talking from 9 to 5: How Women's and Men's Conversational Styles Affect Who Gets Heard, Who Gets Credit, and What Gets Done at Work

== See also ==
- Women in conservatism in the United States
