= Ipuwer Papyrus =

1250 BCE papyrus of a 2000–1800 BCE text

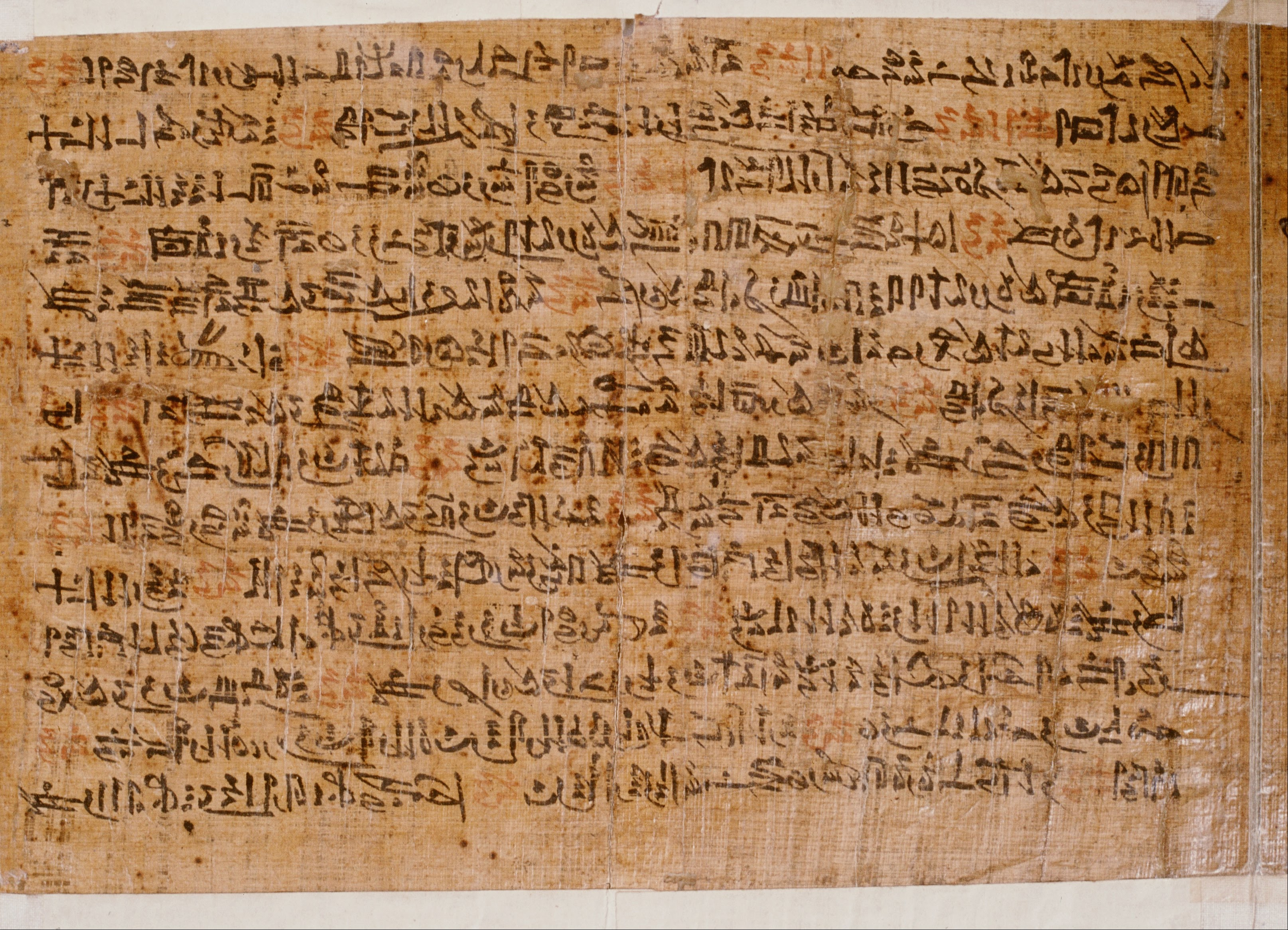
- Created: c. 1250 BCE
- Discovered: before 1829; Egypt
- Present location: Leiden, South Holland, The Netherlands

The Ipuwer Papyrus (officially Papyrus Leiden I 344 recto) is an ancient Egyptian hieratic papyrus made during the Nineteenth Dynasty of Egypt, and now held in the Rijksmuseum van Oudheden in Leiden, Netherlands. It contains the Admonitions of Ipuwer, an incomplete literary work whose original composition is dated no earlier than the late Twelfth Dynasty of Egypt (c. 1991–1803 BCE).

== Discovery ==
During the first half of the 19th century, many Egyptian ancient artifacts were discovered in Egypt by either scholars or merchants who tried to make a quick profit. The Ipuwer Papyrus was discovered by such unprofessional traders, who sold it to Giovanni Anastasi, who served as Consul in Egypt for Sweden and Norway. In 1828, Anastasi sold the papyrus to the Dutch government.

== Content ==
In the poem, Ipuwer – a name typical of the period 1850–1450 BCE – complains that the world has been turned upside-down: a woman who had not a single box now owns furniture, a girl who used to look at her face in the water now has a mirror, while the once-rich man is now in rags. He demands that the Lord of All (a title which could refer to either the king or the creator sun-god) destroy his enemies and remember his religious duties. This is followed by a vivid description of the disorders: there is no longer any respect for the law and even the king's burial inside the pyramid has been desecrated. The story continues with the recalling of better days until it abruptly ends due to the missing final part of the papyrus. It is likely that the poem concluded with a reply of the Lord of All, or prophesying the coming of a powerful king who would restore order.

== Discussion ==
The Ipuwer Papyrus has been dated no earlier than the Nineteenth Dynasty, around 1250 BCE but the text itself is much older, and dated back no earlier than the late Twelfth Dynasty of the Egyptian Middle Kingdom. The Admonitions is considered the world's earliest known treatise on political ethics, suggesting that a good king is one who controls unjust officials, thus carrying out the will of the gods. It is a textual lamentation, close to Sumerian City Laments and to Egyptian laments for the dead, using the past (the destruction of Memphis at the end of the Old Kingdom) as a gloomy backdrop to an ideal future.

It was previously thought that the Admonitions of Ipuwer presents an objective portrait of Egypt in the First Intermediate Period. In more recent times, it was found that the Admonitions, along with the Complaints of Khakheperraseneb, are most likely works of royal propaganda, both inspired by the earlier Prophecy of Neferti: the three compositions have in common the theme of a nation that has been plunged into chaos and disarray and the need for an intransigent king who would defeat chaos and restore maat. Toby Wilkinson suggested that the Admonitions and Khakheperresenb may thus have been composed during the reign of Senusret III, a pharaoh well known for his use of propaganda. Ian Shaw does not consider the Admonitions to be a reliable account of early Egyptian history, because of the long time interval between its original composition and the writing of the Leiden Papyrus.

Miriam Lichtheim assessed it as didactic literature, and the most obscure and fragmentary of the genre. It was neither referring to any historical period, nor addressing supposed calamities of the 1st Intermediate era as proposed by Alan Gardiner. Roland Enmarch explains that it presents a motif of an "inverted world" about order versus chaos. The setting of Ipuwer is vague and ahistoric, which gives the lament a timeless relevance.

== Ipuwer and the Book of Exodus ==
Ipuwer has often been put forward in popular literature as confirmation of the biblical account of the Exodus, most notably because of its statement that "the river is blood" and its frequent references to servants running away. This assertion has not gained acceptance among the majority of scholars. There are disparities between Ipuwer and the narrative in the Book of Exodus, such as that the papyrus describes the Asiatics as arriving in Egypt rather than leaving. The papyrus' statement that the "river is blood" phrase may refer to the red sediment colouring the Nile during disastrous floods, or simply be a poetic image of turmoil. Gary A. Rendsburg suggested that while it is not a reference to the first plague, the Biblical author may have drawn upon this recognized Egyptian literary trope.

Other scholars such as Joshua J. Mark have claimed that the Ipuwer papyrus was never intended to be a description of historical fact, and that interpreting it in this way takes it out of its ancient context. He also criticized amateur documentaries like Patterns of Evidence, and the work of David Rohl, describing them as "intellectually and historically dishonest". He concludes that the papyrus fits within the collective body of Middle Kingdom lamentation literature, and most likely has no relation to the Exodus story.

== See also ==
- Dispute between a Man and his Ba
- List of ancient Egyptian papyri
- List of artifacts in biblical archaeology
- Plagues of Egypt
- The Eloquent Peasant
