= A Return to Modesty =

1999 book by Wendy Shalit

A Return to Modesty: Discovering the Lost Virtue
- First edition cover
- Author: Wendy Shalit
- Cover artist: Albrecht Dürer, Eve, 1507
- Publisher: Free Press
- Publication date: 1999
- Publication place: United States
- Media type: Print (hardback and paperback)
- Pages: 291
- ISBN: 0684863170

A Return to Modesty: Discovering the Lost Virtue is a 1999 non-fiction debut book by Wendy Shalit.

In A Return to Modesty, Shalit claims that modern culture's emphasis on sexual explicitness has eroded the romantic allure and deeper meaning of sexuality, particularly for women. Shalit suggests that the loss of modesty in educational and social settings not only undermines traditional romance but also promotes a cultural norm that devalues sexual dignity and choice.

Shalit argues that modern culture stigmatizes virginity and punishes sexual restraint, especially in women, leading to emotional distress and confusion. She claims feminists, media, and liberal attitudes have undermined modesty and encouraged a harmful, promiscuous lifestyle.

== See also ==
- Girls Gone Mild
- Doesn't Anyone Blush Anymore?
- Chastity
