= Ruth Shalit =

American journalist

Ruth Shalit Barrett
- Born: Ruth Shalit; 1971 (age 54–55); Milwaukee, Wisconsin, U.S.
- Education: Princeton University
- Occupations: Writer, journalist
- Spouse: Robertson Barrett (m. 2004)
- Relatives: Wendy Shalit
- Website: www.ruthsbarrett.com

Ruth Shalit Barrett (/ʃəˈliːt/; born 1971) is an American freelance writer and journalist whose articles have appeared in The New Republic, The Wall Street Journal, ELLE, New York Magazine and The Atlantic.

In 1994 and 1995, she was discovered to have plagiarized portions of several articles she wrote for the New Republic, and to have made several substantial errors in another.

She is the sister of conservative writer and author Wendy Shalit. She married Henry Robertson Barrett IV in 2004, becoming the stepdaughter-in-law of Edward Klein. Robertson Barrett was the Vice President of Media Strategy and Operations at Yahoo! before becoming the president of Hearst's digital division in 2016.

As of 2020, Shalit lives in Westport, Connecticut, with her husband and two children.

== Career ==
Shalit graduated from Princeton University in 1992 and made her journalistic debut with Reason that same year. Soon after, she was offered an internship at The New Republic. Shalit was considered to be an up-and-coming young journalist throughout the 1990s after she was promoted to an associate editor position at The New Republic, writing cover stories for the political weekly. She also wrote for the New York Times Magazine and GQ.

In 1994 and 1995, Shalit was discovered to have plagiarized portions of several articles she wrote for New Republic. One story included unattributed prose by Legal Times writer Daniel Klaidman, another text by National Journal’s Paul Starobin.

In the fall of 1995, Shalit wrote a 13,000-word piece about race relations at The Washington Post. Shalit later admitted to "major errors" in the article, such as an assertion that a Washington, D.C., contractor who had never been indicted had served a prison sentence for corruption; misquoting a number of staffers; and numerous factual errors, such as mistakenly claiming that certain jobs at The Post were reserved for Black employees.

She left the New Republic in January 1999.

In 2020, The Atlantic published a freelance article Shalit wrote titled "The Mad, Mad World of Niche Sports Among Ivy League-Obsessed Parents". The article was published online under the byline Ruth S. Barrett in October, as part of the November-dated print issue. The article described the efforts of wealthy parents to improve their children's chances of acceptance to Ivy League universities. After questions were raised by The Washington Post's media critic, Erik Wemple, the magazine appended several corrections to the online version, along with a lengthy editor's note. On November 1, The Atlantic announced it was retracting the entire article after further investigation, but uploaded a PDF of the article's print version for the sake of "the historical record".

The original editor's note cited concerns about the accuracy of the article and about Shalit's trustworthiness. Shalit sued The Atlantic and one of its editors for defamation in 2022, alleging reputation harm. The parties settled the dispute out of court June 2025, at which time the magazine updated the editor's note regarding the retraction.

== See also ==
- Stephen Glass
