= TT311 =

Theban tomb

Theban tomb TT311
- Burial site of Kheti
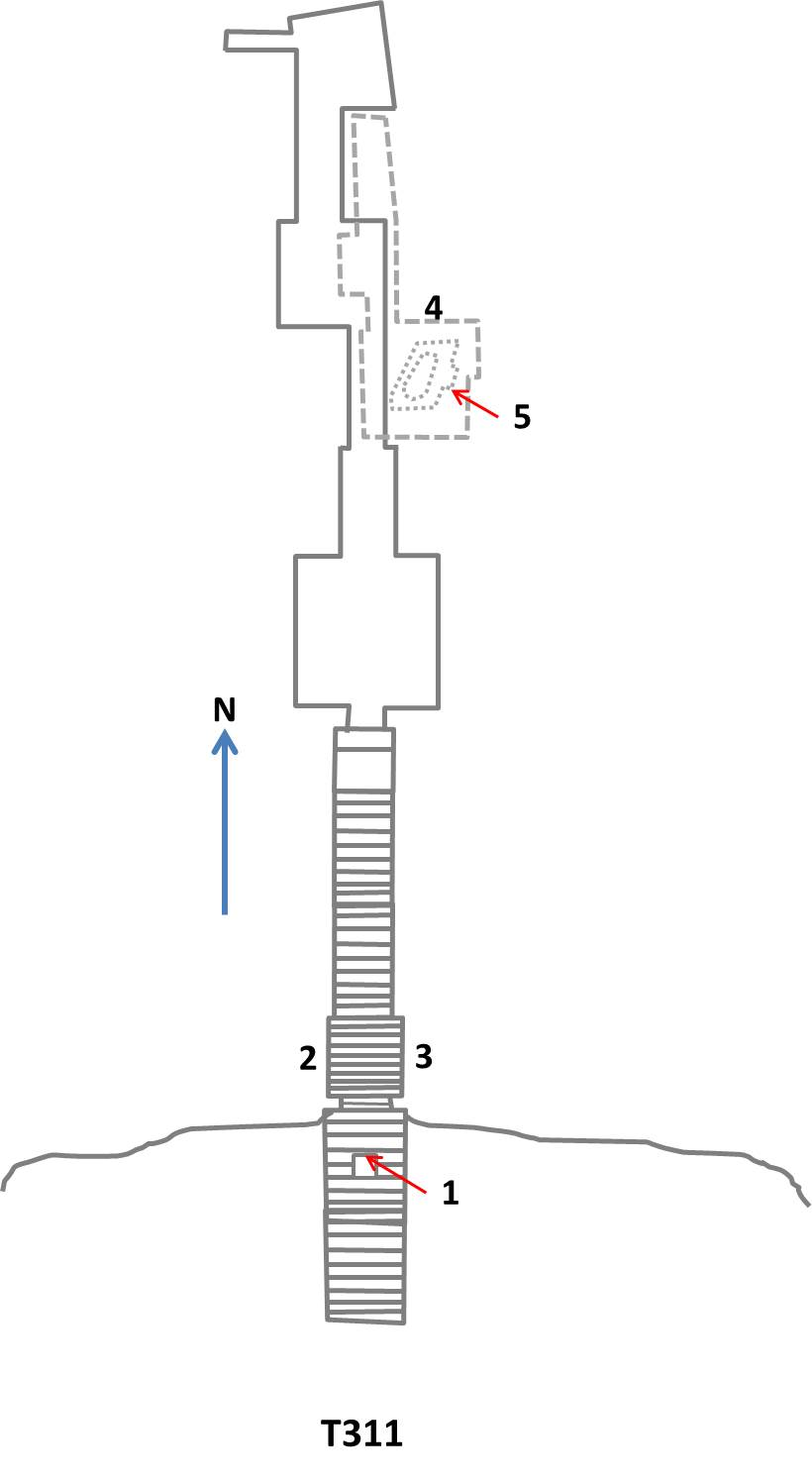

- Location within Egypt
- Location: Deir el-Bahari, Theban Necropolis
- ← Previous; TT310 Next → TT312

F32 t i i
Kheti
in hieroglyphs
Era: Middle Kingdom
(2055–1650 BC)

The Theban Tomb TT311 (MMA 508) is located in Deir el-Bahari, part of the Theban Necropolis, on the west bank of the Nile, opposite to Luxor. The tomb belongs to the Seal-bearer of the King of Lower Egypt named Kheti. The tomb was excavated by Winlock during the 1923 excavations on behalf of the Metropolitan Museum of Art. Kheti had a tomb near the funerary temple of king Mentuhotep II. The tomb was found heavily looted and destroyed by tomb robbers but there are still many remains of reliefs showing that it was once decorated. The burial chamber was better preserved and was also decorated.

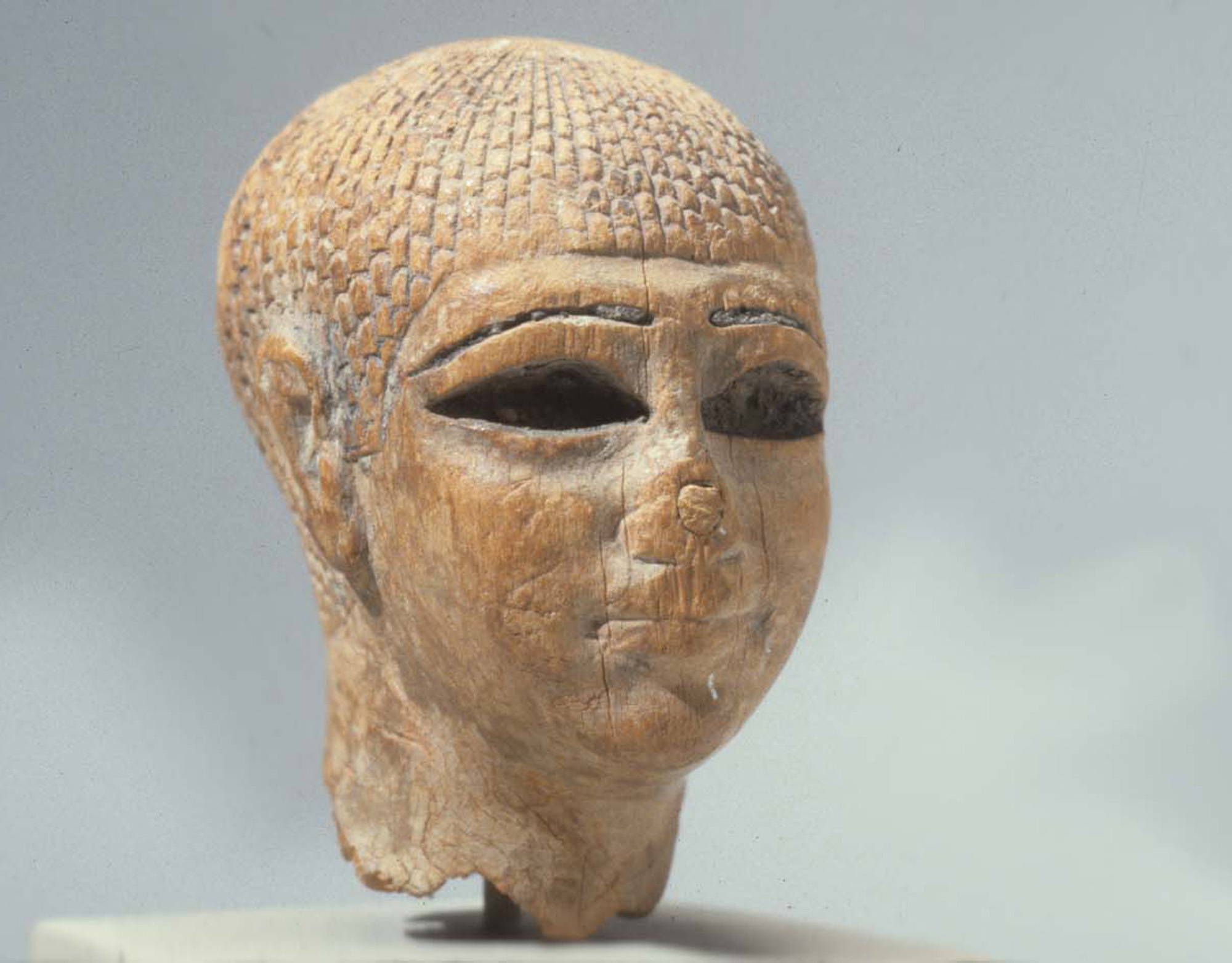
Head of a female figure from TT311

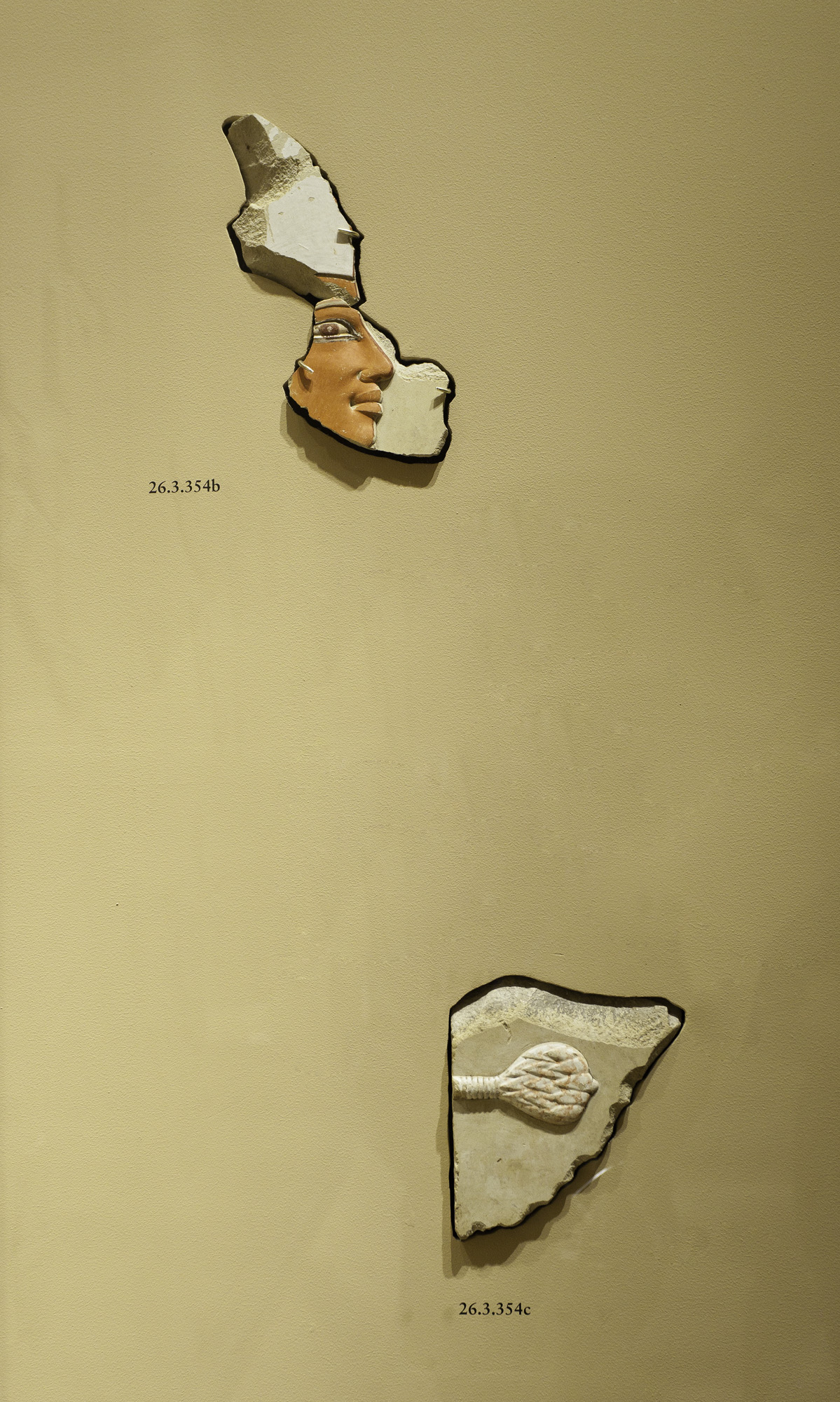
Fragments of a relief depicting Mentuhotep II wearing the White Crown

Fragments of a relief depicting Kheti

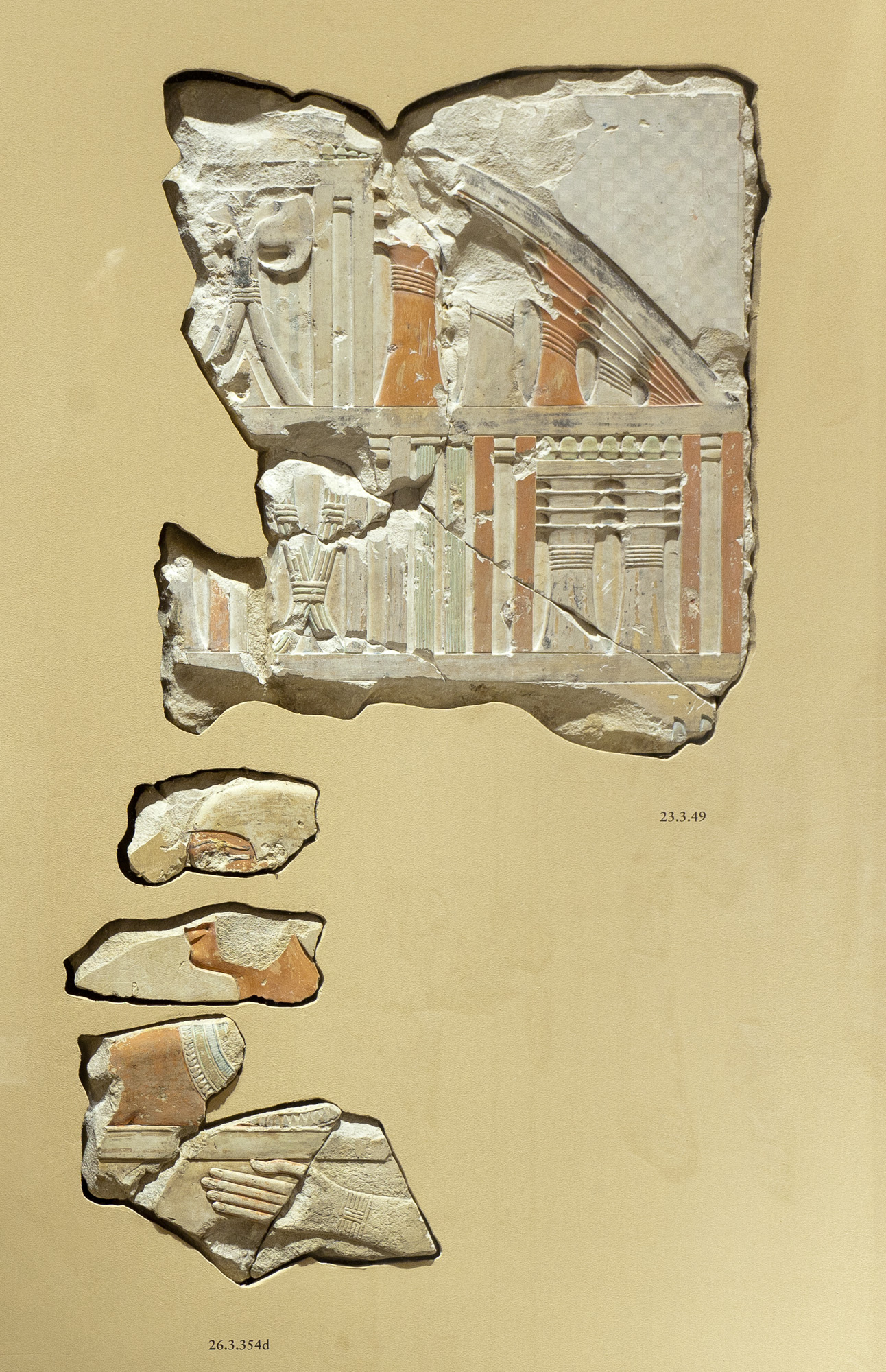
Fragments of a relief depicting Kheti sitting in an armchair under an elaborate canopy

Image of the burial chamber during excavation, showing the chamber floor having been ripped up by looters.

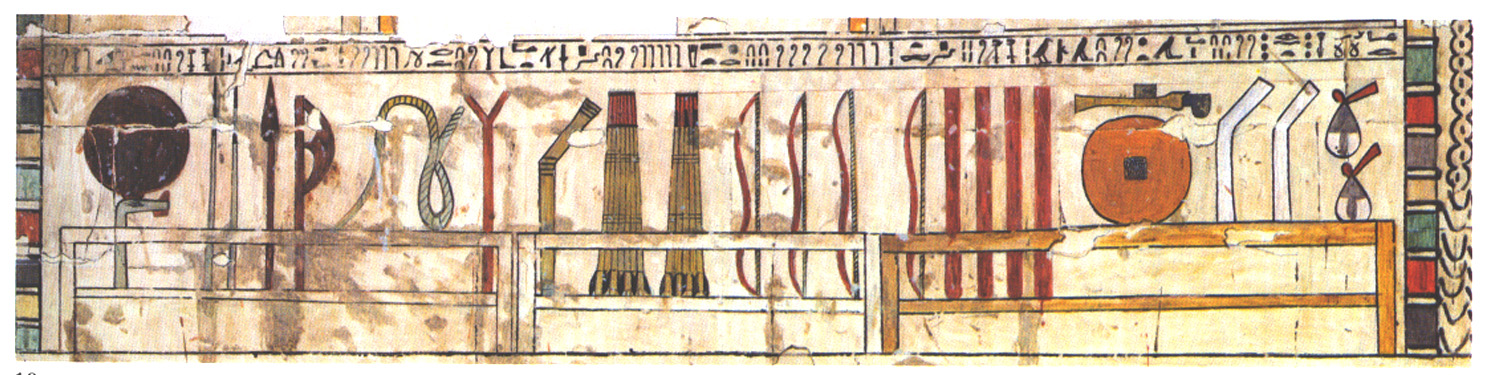
Facsimile of a painting from TT311 depicting weapons, located on the north wall of the burial chamber

== See also ==
- List of Theban tombs
- List of MMA Tombs
