= Citrus College =

Community college in Glendora, California, US

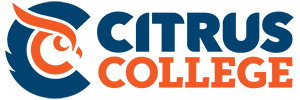
- Type: Public community college
- Established: 1915; 111 years ago
- Parent institution: Citrus Community College District
- President: Greg Schulz
- Students: 19,626
- Location: Glendora, California, United States; 34°08′06.15″N 117°53′07.40″W
- Campus: Suburban 104 acres (42 ha)
- Colors: Blue and orange
- Nickname: Owls
- Sporting affiliations: CCCAA – WSC, SCFA (football)
- Mascot: Hootie
- Website: www.citruscollege.edu

Citrus College is a public community college in Glendora, California. The Citrus Community College District, which supports the institution, includes the communities of Azusa, Claremont, Duarte, Glendora and Monrovia.

Citrus Union High School was founded in 1891 to serve students from Azusa and Glendora. In 1915, educator Floyd S. Hayden expanded its offerings to include a junior college and, from 1915 to 1961, the school was operated by the Citrus Union High School District as both a high school and a junior college. Citrus College is the oldest community college in Los Angeles County, California, and the fifth oldest in the state of California.

During the 2019-2020 academic year, Citrus College enrolled 19,626 students. It conferred 2,444 degrees and awarded 2,175 certificates. Citrus College offers 65 associate degree programs and 88 certificate programs, as well as skill awards in career technical education programs. Its operating budget for 2020-2021 was $78 million.

== Campus ==
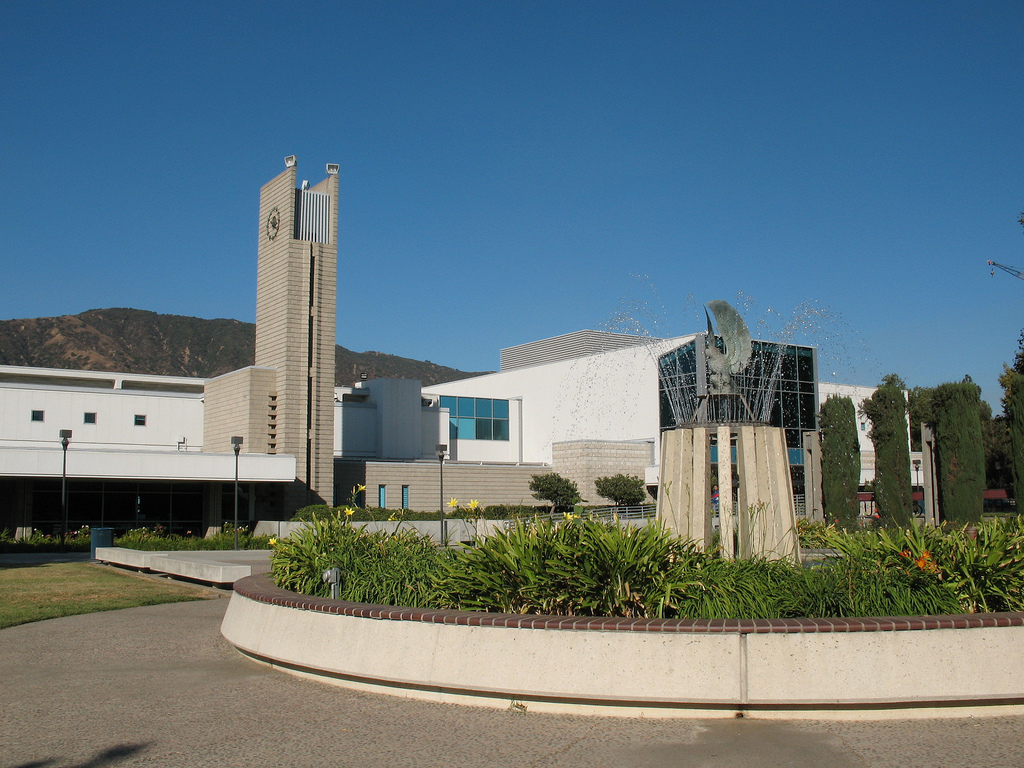
The fountain at Citrus College with library in background.

Citrus College has a 104-acre (42 ha) campus, which includes 44 buildings and seven outdoor athletic facilities.

The Haugh Performing Arts Center (HPAC), which is located on campus, is a 1,440-seat proscenium venue and is host to over 140 performances annually, with over 100,000 patrons in attendance. Seats are no more than 90 feet (27 m) from the stage.

The campus is also served by a nearby rail station for the Metro A Line as of March 5, 2016.

== Athletics ==
The college's athletic teams are known as the Owls. The college currently fields eight men's and eight women's varsity teams. It competes as a member of the California Community College Athletic Association (CCCAA) in the Western State Conference (WSC) for all sports except football, which competes in Southern California Football Association (SCFA). The football and soccer teams play at the 10,000-seat-capacity Citrus Stadium.

== Academics ==
The college is accredited by the Accrediting Commission for Community and Junior Colleges (ACCJC). Its professional memberships include the American Association of Community Colleges (AACC), the Community College League of California (CCLC), the Hispanic Association of Colleges and Universities (HACU), and California Colleges for International Education (CCIE).

The college runs the Citrus Singers program. The program started in the 1960s and has provided a foundation for students to learn and perform music. Many of its alumni have gone on to be performers on Broadway and TV.

== Student demographics ==
Student demographics as of Fall 2023
Race and ethnicity	Total
Hispanic	64%
White	15%
Asian	9%
Multiracial	4%
African American	3%
Unknown	3%
Filipino	2%

== Notable faculty ==
- John Boylan, Professor of Critical Listening Skills, and Music Business/Audio Careers
- Dale Salwak, Professor of English. Author of numerous books, including Teaching Life, a memoir of over 35 years of teaching.

== Notable alumni ==
- Summer Bishil, professional actress
- Sheryl Cooper, professional dancer and wife of Alice Cooper
- Dane Cruikshank, professional football player
- Quinton Ganther, professional football player and current coach
- Harvey Guillén, professional actor
- Richie Hearn, professional race car driver
- Ron Husband, first African American supervising animator at Walt Disney
- Billy Kilmer, professional football player
- Chris Limahelu, college football player
- Lionel Manuel, professional football player
- Lynsi Snyder, owner and heiress of the In-N-Out Burger company

== Free speech lawsuits ==
In 2003, under the pressure of litigation and FIRE's national campaign for campus constitutional rights, the Citrus College Board of Trustees voted to rescind most of the speech codes at the public institution. This was the first victory in FIRE's declared war on speech codes at public colleges and universities.

Citrus College was sued again by FIRE in the early 2010s when it reinstated its policy after a Young Americans for Liberty chapter, led by Gabriel Nadales and Vincenzo Sinapi-Riddle, was threatened with sanctions for not staying inside the "Free Speech Zone." In an interview with the San Gabriel Valley Tribune, Greg Lukianoff, the president of FIRE, said, "Citrus College agreed to eliminate its restrictive 'free speech zone' in the face of a FIRE lawsuit back in 2003, but later reinstated its speech quarantine when it thought no one was watching ... but FIRE was watching, and we'll continue to do so. If the speech codes come back again, so will we."
