= Girls Gone Mild =

2007 book by Wendy Shalit

Girls Gone Mild: Young Women Reclaim Self-Respect and Find It's Not Bad to Be Good
- Author: Wendy Shalit
- Language: English
- Publisher: Random House
- Publication date: June 26, 2007
- Pages: 316
- ISBN: 978-1-4000-6473-1
- Website: girlsgonemild.com

Girls Gone Mild: Young Women Reclaim Self-Respect and Find It's Not Bad to Be Good is a book by Wendy Shalit published by Random House in 2007.

== Reception ==
Critical reception for Girls Gone Mild has been mixed. One reviewer notes, "Adults in authority—school administrators, commentators, and government officials—often seem to want teens to get only one side of the sexuality story. But girls need—and want—an alternative. In letting more and more young Americans know the alternative is out there."

Another critic notes, "Revamping outdated notions of femininity and positioning them as cutting edge may be a smart way to sell a glut of baggy bathing suits then, but it sure doesn't sound like a revolution."

== See also ==
- A Return to Modesty
- Doesn't Anyone Blush Anymore?
- Chastity
