= Bais Chana Women International =

Chabad school

Information
- Founded: 1971

Bais Chana Women International is a Chabad non-profit organization that works to provide an environment for Jewish girls and women, ages 15 and up and from all backgrounds, to explore Jewish teachings and traditions.

== Overview ==
Bais Chana's founding was inspired and motivated by the Lubavitcher Rebbe, Rabbi Menachem Mendel Schneerson's support of Jewish education for all women. In 1971, its first home was opened in the Twin Cities, Minnesota.

In 1991 the organization began diversifying its program to include shorter retreat segments in locations around the world. Women of all ages and little or no formal background in Jewish traditions have taken part in these educational retreats, which include classes, group study, private tutoring and mentoring.

The full class schedule explores life as a Jewish woman, comprising discussion and in-depth study of Hasidic texts, Torah, prayer, Bible commentary, Midrash, Maimonides, Kabbalah, Talmud and more; and incorporating hands-on projects such as challah baking. The rotating teaching staff features Bais Chana's co-founder, Rabbi Manis Friedman.

Under the direction of Mrs. Hinda Leah Sharfstein, Bais Chana is now headquartered in New York and has further expanded to include three annual sessions at an array of venues across the United States, including learning retreats for couples, the Snorkel and Study Program, and The Jewish Un-Camp.

- Throughout the year there are small-scale retreats around the United States such as the Thanksgiving Retreat that was held in Morristown, NJ for High School girls in 2007.
- The Snorkel and Study Program, which began in January 2006, is held annually in Key Largo, Florida, and attended by up to 90 female students from campuses around the world.
- The Un-Camp is geared towards teens, and participants discuss topics such as "prayer, science, mitzvahs, self-image, relationships, happiness, life and death, the Jewish belief in the Messiah, the soul," and more while participating in traditional summer camp activities.

Anthropologist Lynn Davidman performed fieldwork for her doctoral dissertation at Bais Chana. The results of her study have been published in her book Tradition in a Rootless World: Women Turn to Orthodox Judaism (UC Press, 1993). Davidman found that the majority of young women at Bais Chana were there to fill a void in their lives, and were hoping to find an Orthodox husband and begin a family, and that "strong boundaries" were established "between the [Chabad] religious group and the outside."

== See also ==
- Baal teshuva
- Beth Rivkah
- Bais Yaakov#Hasidic schools
- Jewish fundamentalism
- Midrasha
- Orthodox Judaism outreach
- Women in Judaism
