= Gone Wild =

Gone Wild may refer to:

- Gone Wild, a comedy album by The Bob & Tom Show
- Gone Wild, a novel in the Rock War series by Robert Muchamore

== See also ==
- Girls Gone Wild (disambiguation)
