= Ron Husband =

American character animator (born 1950)

Ronald "Ron" Husband (born February 8, 1950) is an African-American character animator known for his work at Walt Disney Animation Studios where he worked for 38 years starting in 1975.

== Career ==
Ron Husband joined The Walt Disney Company in 1975 where his first project was assisting Frank Thomas and Ollie Johnston on The Rescuers. He then received a promotion to assistant animator to work on Pete's Dragon and worked on his first project as an animator on the Disney short film The Small One. After a short time away to recover from surgery due to a brain cyst, he worked as a Disney animator full time. During production of The Fox and the Hound, Frank and Ollie retired (early 1978) and he was transferred to newly minted animator Randy Cartwright. His most famous assignments while at Disney were with Russ Edmonds in The Rescuers Down Under, animating Gaston and Jafar with Andreas Deja in Beauty and the Beast and Aladdin, Pumbaa with Tony Bancroft and David Pruiksma in The Lion King, John Smith with John Pomeroy in Pocahontas, Titans and Cyclops with Dominique Monféry in Hercules, Captain Long John Silver with Glen Keane in Treasure Planet and as supervising animator for Djali in The Hunchback of Notre Dame, the Elk in the Firebird Suite - 1919 Version Segment of Fantasia 2000 and Doctor Joshua Strongbear Sweet in Atlantis: The Lost Empire.

In 1991, he was honored as the recipient of the Centurion Award after addressing the National Religious Broadcasters Convention in Washington, D.C. In the years of 1991 to 1996, Husband was a featured speaker at the Black Filmmakers Hall of Fame in Oakland, California. In 1998 he received the National Achievement in Art Scholastic Award. Husband received a Lifetime Achievement Award by Black Hollywood Education and Resource Center (BHERC) at its 17th Annual African American Film Marketplace and S.E Manley Short Film Showcase on December 10, 2010. From 2002 until retiring in 2013, he worked in the Publishing Group, as an illustrator.

== Quick Sketching with Ron Husband ==
Ron Husband also has published a book called "Quick Sketching with Ron Husband." It lays out the fundamentals of quick sketching and how it benefits an illustrator. He focuses on the importance of basic shapes, simplicity, and clarity of design. He emphasizes how sketching is just as important as the finished product. The book is about how important drawing is to an artist and how those drawings are used to tell a story

== Personal life ==
Ron Husband was born in Monrovia, California on February 8, 1950. Husband was raised Christian by a single mother as the youngest of three brothers in a small, segregated community. The age difference between Husband and his brothers was so drastic, the closest in age to him being 13 years apart, that around the age of 5 he was practically being raised as an only child. He and his family moved during his childhood to different houses within southern California.

Husband attributes his strong work ethic to his mother, who worked to provide for her children when they were young. Husband describes his mother as "always supportive" and "a great role model." Another role model in his life was his brother Ken, who was athletic and the captain of his school's basketball team. Husband found role models in his own life because there was no positive African American character representation on television at the time for him to look up to. Drawing has always been second nature to Husband from a young age. In high school, he took art his junior year only to be kicked out before the end of the school year for not cleaning a paintbrush after his teacher asked him to. He believed he didn't need art classes because he already knew how to draw. Prior to being kicked out of art class in high school, his work was chosen to compete in a local art competition in downtown LA and was then sent to New York where he won a national prize for best pen and ink work. This is when he realized that art could be his pathway to a career in art after seeing all of the positive feedback. After high school, he continued to take art classes at Citrus College in California and University of Nevada which he was able to attend on a sports scholarship.

He then directed his attention to commercial artistry in order to continue his drawing outside of school. He also painted cars in his friends backyard as another creative outlet. He was welcomed into the Walt Disney company based on the potential they saw in his drawing sketchbooks and commercial art portfolio after he left them outside the front gate addressed to Eric Larson, head of recruitment training program at the time. In 1978 when Husband was 28 years old he began experiencing symptoms from a cyst in his brain. He received an eight-hour surgery to remove the cyst at St. Joseph hospital and after about three months, he began showing signs of recovery with little to no long term side effects after initially being told he would either die or be paralyzed from the surgery. He focuses on using his status as the first black animator at Disney in order to open opportunities for young black animators to follow the possibility of pursuing an animation career through workshops, interviews and teaching classes since his retirement. Husband has three children with his wife, LaVonne, to whom he has been married since 1974. He and his family all pursue artistic endeavors such as animation, journalism and poetry.

== Works ==
Some of Ron Husband's most recognizable animated works include:

- The Rescuers (1977) (Inbetween Artist - Uncredited)
- Pete's Dragon (1977) (Assistant Animator - Uncredited)
- The Small One (1978) (Short) (Character Animator)
- A Family Circus Christmas (1979) (TV Movie) (Assistant Animator)
- The Fox and the Hound (1981) (Character Animator)
- The Black Cauldron (1985) (Animator)
- The Great Mouse Detective (1986) (Character Animator)
- Oliver & Company (1988) (Character Animator)
- The Little Mermaid (1989) (Character Animator)
- The Rescuers Down Under (1990) (Character Animator)
- Beauty and the Beast (1991) (Animator: "Gaston")
- Aladdin (1992) (Animator: "Jafar")
- The Lion King (1994) (Animator: "Pumbaa")
- Pocahontas (1995) (Animator: "John Smith")
- The Hunchback of Notre Dame (1996) (Supervising Animator: "Djali")
- Hercules (1997) (Animator: "Titans" and "Cyclops")
- Fantasia 2000 (2000) (Animator - Segment "Piano Concerto No. 2, Allegro, Opus 102") / (Lead Character Animator: "Elk" - Segment "Firebird Suite - 1919 Version")
- John Henry (2000) (Character Designer & Visual Development Artist)
- Atlantis: The Lost Empire (2001) (Supervising Animator: "Doctor Joshua Strongbear Sweet")
- Treasure Planet (2002) (Animator: "Captain Long John Silver")
- Looney Tunes: Back in Action (2003) (Animator)
- Mickey, Donald, Goofy: The Three Musketeers (2004) (Video) (Animator) / (Character Animator)
- Fat Albert (2004) (Animator)
- Pooh's Heffalump Movie (2005) (Key Animator)
- Bambi II (2006) (Video) (Animator)
- The Little Mermaid: Ariel's Beginning (2008) (Video) (Character Designer)
- Waking Sleeping Beauty (2010) (Documentary) (Caricaturist)

=== Music video ===
- Opposites Attract (1989) (animator)
