= Manis Friedman =

American Hasidic rabbi

Rabbi Manis Friedman
- מניס פרידמן
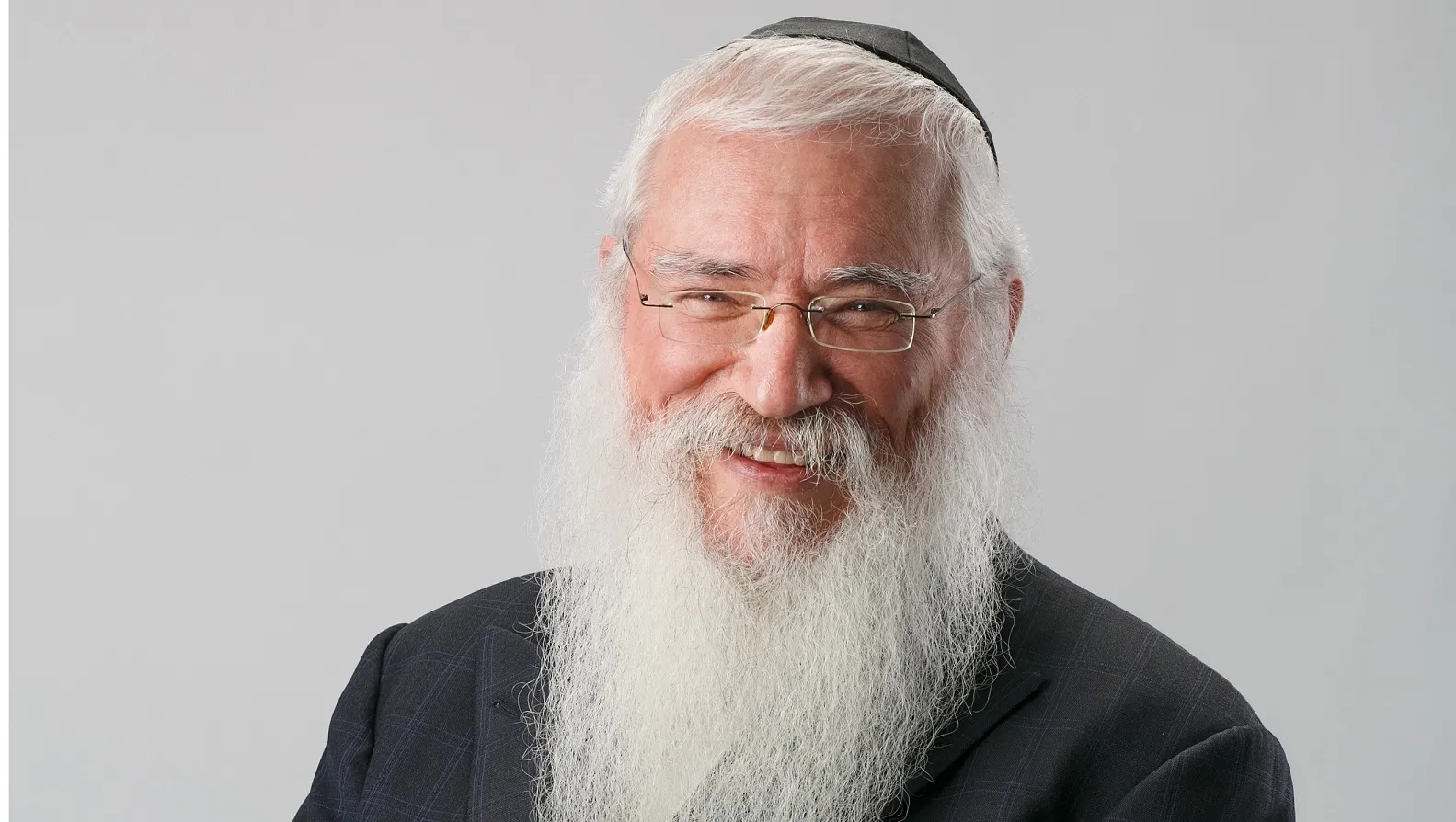
- Rabbi Manis Friedman
- Born: Menachem Manis HaKohen Friedman; February 14, 1946 (age 80); Prague, Czechoslovakia
- Occupations: Chabad Shaliach; Rabbi; Dean of Bais Chana Women International
- Known for: Doesn't Anyone Blush Anymore? "YouTube's Most Popular Rabbi"
- Children: 14, including Benny Friedman
- Website: itsgoodtoknow.org

Manis Friedman (full name: Menachem Manis HaKohen Friedman; Hebrew: מנחם מניס הכהן פרידמן; born February 14, 1946) is a Hasidic rabbi, author, social philosopher, and public speaker. He is the dean of the Bais Chana Institute of Jewish Studies. Friedman wrote Doesn't Anyone Blush Anymore?, which was published in 1990. Friedman appears in The Lost Key (2014), The Jewish Journey: America (2015), and in the documentary-style Patterns of Evidence (2017) series by Christian independent filmmaker Tim Mahoney, which explores his interpretation of biblical chronology. Some of his views have been met with controversy.

== Biography ==
=== Early life ===
Friedman was born in Prague, Czechoslovakia on February 14, 1946 to a Hasidic Ashkenazi Jewish family of Kohanim. His father, Rabbi Yaakov Moshe Friedman, was a son of Rabbi Meir Yisroel Isser Friedman, the Krenitzer Rov. Yaakov Moshe Friedman was later arrested and tortured by the Soviet and Czechoslovak authorities due to his work with the Vaad Hatzalah, rescuing Jewish children from the Soviet Union. His mother was Miriam Friedman, a descendant of the Baal Shem Tov. In 1950, he moved with his family to the United States. He received his rabbinic ordination at the Rabbinical College of Canada in 1969.

=== Career ===
In 1971, inspired by the teachings of the Lubavitcher Rebbe, Friedman as a shliach ("emissary") cofounded the Bais Chana Women International, an Institute for Jewish Studies in Minnesota for women with little or no formal Jewish education. He has served as the school's dean since its inception. From 1984 to 1990, he served as the simultaneous translator for a series of televised talks by the Lubavitcher Rebbe. Friedman briefly served as senior translator for Jewish Educational Media, Inc.

In 1990, HarperCollins published Friedman's first book, Doesn't Anyone Blush Anymore?, which included a blurb from Bob Dylan. He has since published numerous other books, including The Joy of Intimacy, לא בקשתי לבא לעולם (lit. "I didn't ask to come to the world") in Hebrew, and Creating a Life That Matters, which he co-wrote. He has also authored numerous educational books for children, including Who Needs Me? and A to Z Meant to Be: Seeing the Hand of the Creator in Everything That Happens.

In a written response to a question regarding the Israeli–Palestinian conflict, Friedman said that Israel should "kill men, women, and children". He later said that this was meant only in the case where they were using "men, women, and children" as weapons of war.

Friedman is the most popular rabbi on YouTube, with over 450,000 subscribers as of February 2024. In 2024, Rabbi Aharon Feldman, accused him of being a heretic.

=== Family ===
Manis Friedman is a Kohen. He is the brother of the Jewish singer Avraham Fried and father of Jewish singer Benny Friedman. Many of his 14 children serve as Chabad Shluchim.

== Views ==
=== On what causes sexual abuse today ===
Friedman was quoted that we do not need more legislation on matters of sex and crossing boundaries as much as we need to define intimacy clearly. Since “free love” notions of the 60s, the definition of intimacy has been altered in the minds of many people.

He uses an anecdote of a young man who asked about going camping with a female friend. The young man said he went last summer and when her sleeping bag was ruined, they slept side by side in his sleeping bag but nothing happened. Friedman argued that something did in fact happen—a boundary of intimacy was crossed. The notion that intimacy is a choice based on how a person feels in the moment should not be relevant; rather, it should be recognized that the smallest act of kindness, like physical touch, is in fact intimacy.

The implication is that the modern mindset on intimacy is a loose definition, but if the definition is clearly set, men can be taught to respect women.

=== Two types of love ===
According to Friedman, the love between spouses must overcome the differences between the two parties, generating greater intensity in the relationship. By contrast the love between other family members are predicated upon the commonness the two parties share. Friedman further states that husband and wife, male and female, in essence always remain strangers; for this reason the acquired love in the relationship is never entirely consistent.

=== Fidelity ===
On fidelity in marriage, Friedman is quoted stating "If you help yourself to the benefits of being married when you are single, you're likely to help yourself to the benefits of being single when you're married."

=== Femininity ===
Sociologist Lynn Davidman interviewed a number of students studying under Friedman in 1983. She quotes Friedman saying that a woman "violates herself" if she were to refrain from having children and that birth control is a "violent violation of a woman's being".

== Published works ==
- Doesn't Anyone Blush Anymore? Reclaiming Modesty, Intimacy and Sexuality

== See also ==
- Simon Jacobson
- Tzvi Freeman
