= Khakheperraseneb =

Egyptian scribe

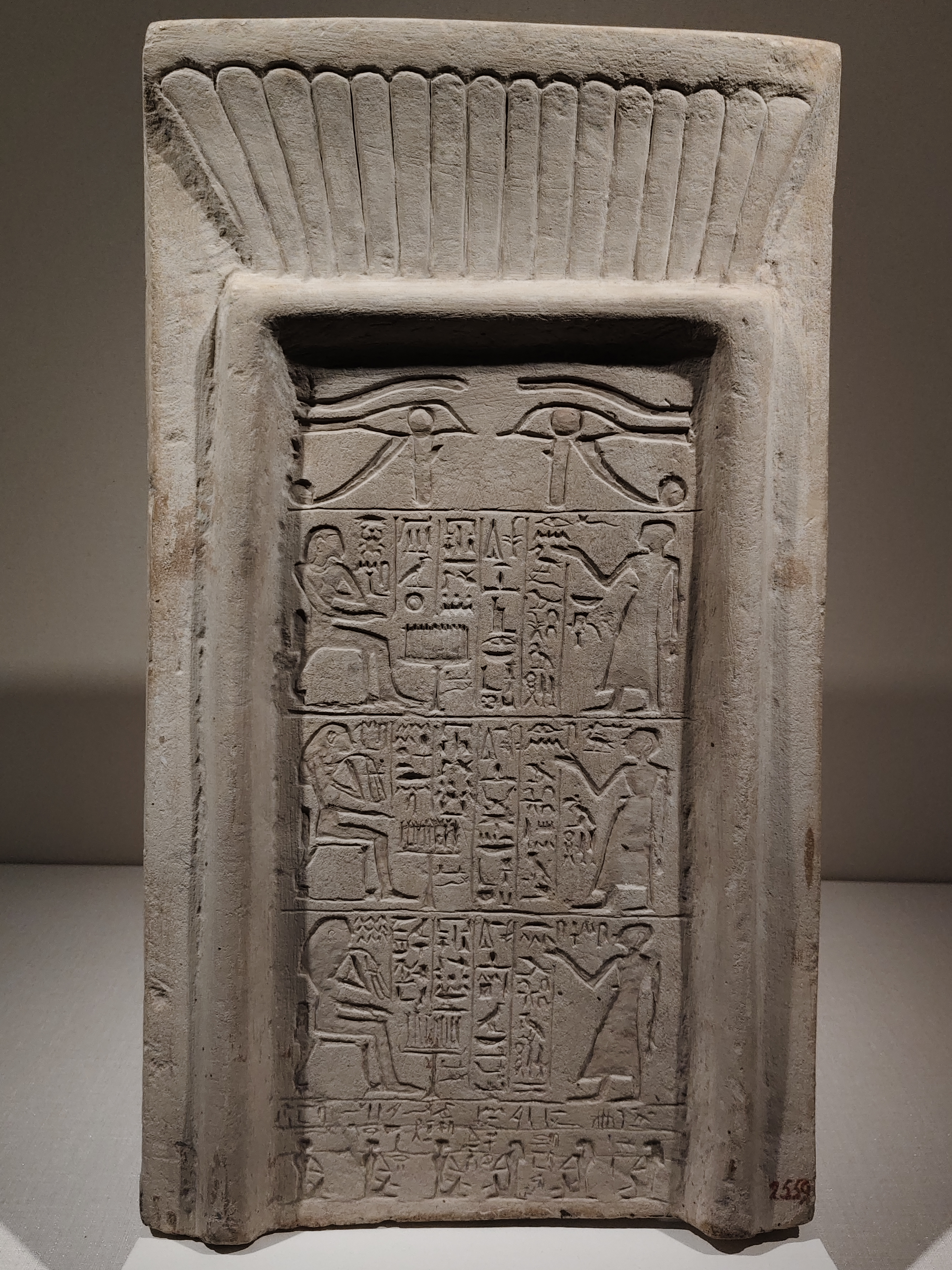
Funerary Stele of Khakheperraseneb

Khakheperraseneb (fl. c. 1900 BC) (also transliterated as Khakheperresenb, Khakheperrē-sonb, Khakheperre-sonb) was an Egyptian scribe who lived during the reign of Senusret II, and is the presumed author of Sayings of Khakheperraseneb.

== See also ==
- List of ancient Egyptian scribes
