= Kheti (treasurer) =

Ancient Egyptian treasurer

- Treasurer of Egypt
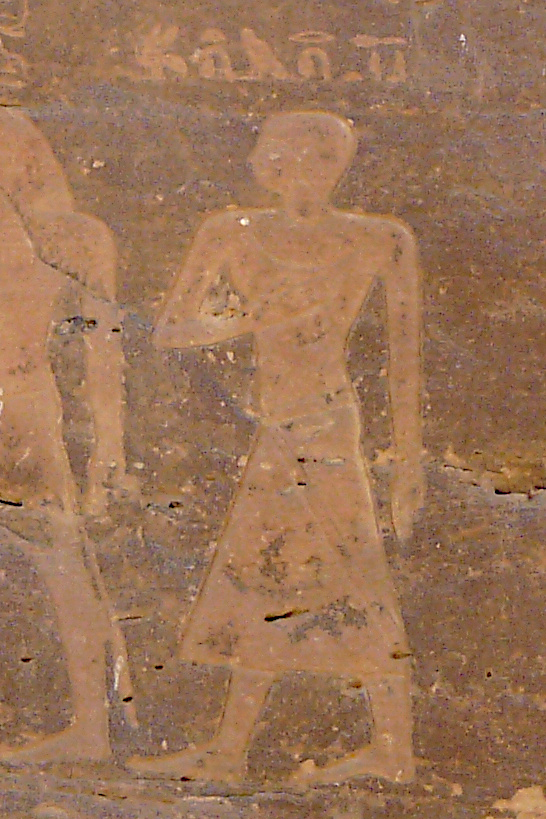
- Kheti at Shatt er-Rigal
Egyptian name
X t i i
- Pharaoh: Mentuhotep II
- Burial: TT311, Theban Necropolis, Egypt

Kheti was an ancient Egyptian treasurer of the 11th Dynasty, under king Mentuhotep II. Kheti appears in several sources and was one of the most influential figures at the royal court of the king. He is depicted in two rock reliefs at Shatt er-Rigal where he is standing in front of the king. Once the king wears the Sed festival dress. It can be assumed that Kheti was involved in arranging the festival for the king. His name and title appear in the funerary temple of the king in Deir el-Bahari and he had a tomb near the funerary temple of his king. The tomb (TT311) was found heavily destroyed but there are still many remains of reliefs showing that it was once decorated. The burial chamber was better preserved and was also decorated. His successor was Meketre.
