= Wendy Shalit =

American conservative writer and author (born 1975)

- Born: 1975 (age 50–51); Milwaukee, Wisconsin, United States
- Education: Williams College (BA)
- Occupations: Writer, author
- Relatives: Ruth Shalit; Mina Shalit

Wendy Shalit (/ʃəˈliːt/; born 1975) is an American conservative writer and author who has written the books A Return to Modesty: Discovering the Lost Virtue, published by Free Press in 1999; Girls Gone Mild: Young Rebels Reclaim Self-Respect and Find It's Not Bad to Be Good, published by Random House in 2007; and The Good Girl Revolution: Young Rebels with Self-Esteem and High Standards, published by Random House in 2008.

Born in Milwaukee, Wisconsin, she is the sister of writer Ruth Shalit and Mina Shalit. She graduated from Williams College with a BA in philosophy.

Her articles on cultural and literary topics have appeared in Commentary, The Wall Street Journal and Slate.

A Return to Modesty has attracted much controversy, most notably earning her attacks from Katha Pollitt in The New York Times and Larry Flynt in Hustler magazine. By contrast, George Will reviewed the book positively in Newsweek. But, according to the website D1NT, Shalit received many letters of support from young women who were disenchanted with the sexual revolution, prompting her to start an online support forum called ModestlyYours with 20 bloggers "of all ages and backgrounds whose voices are not normally heard in the mainstream (or even non-mainstream) media."

Mona Charen has called ModestlyYours an "antidote to the vulgarity that is shoved in our faces from magazine covers, television, raunch radio, movies, and shows ... Shalit names a 'rebel of the month' on the site, choosing young women who exemplify modesty, intelligence, and integrity. They are the counter counterculture—and not a minute too soon."

Shalit's second book, Girls Gone Mild: Young Women Reclaim Self-Respect and Find It's Not Bad to Be Good, was released on June 26, 2007.

== Books ==
- A Return to Modesty: Discovering the Lost Virtue (1999) ISBN 0684863170
- Girls Gone Mild: Young Rebels Reclaim Self-Respect and Find It's Not Bad to Be Good (2007) ISBN 1400064732
- The Good Girl Revolution: Young Rebels with Self-Esteem and High Standards (2008) ISBN 0812975367
