= Patterns of Evidence =

2014 film by Tim Mahoney

- Patterns of Evidence: Exodus theatrical release poster
- Directed by: Tim Mahoney
- Written by: Tim Mahoney; Steve Law
- Produced by: Kevin O'Neill
- Narrated by: Kevin Sorbo
- Cinematography: Ramy Romany
- Production company: Thinking Man Films
- Distributed by: Thinking Man Films; Fathom Events
- Release dates: 2015 (Patterns of Evidence: Exodus); 2019 (Patterns of Evidence: The Moses Controversy); 2020 (Patterns of Evidence: The Red Sea Miracle)
- Country: United States
- Language: English
- Box office: Patterns of Evidence: Exodus, $925,576

Patterns of Evidence is a film series directed by Tim Mahoney and part of the independent Christian film industry. The films advocate for Mahoney's views on biblical chronology, which he contrasts with mainstream scholarly opinion.

== Patterns of Evidence: Exodus ==
Patterns of Evidence: Exodus is a 2014 documentary film directed by Tim Mahoney. The film presents the view that the biblical story of the Exodus of the Hebrew slaves from Egypt was a historical event that took place during the Middle Kingdom of Egypt. To the extent that other scholars consider the Exodus a historical event, it is usually placed later, during the New Kingdom of Egypt. It was released at the Pan Pacific Film Festival in July 2014, and in theaters by Thinking Man Film on January 19, 2015.

The film describes various findings Mahoney presents as supporting his case. These include possible archaeological findings of evidence of Hebrew habitation in ancient Egypt, findings as to the timeline of the events of Exodus, and contemporary events in ancient Egypt. It also describes existing artifacts and documents from Ancient Egypt which experts have long debated.

The film is somewhat—but not entirely—based on David Rohl's New Chronology which contradicts mainstream Egyptology.

The film features interviews with archaeologists, historians, and biblical scholars.

== Patterns of Evidence: The Moses Controversy ==
Patterns of Evidence: The Moses Controversy is a 2019 documentary film directed by Tim Mahoney and sequel to Patterns of Evidence: Exodus. It examines whether Moses directly wrote the events of the Exodus as an eye-witness account, and largely advocates for the traditional Mosaic authorship view that the "Five Books of Moses" (Pentateuch) were directly written by Moses himself, with the exceptions of the parts that describe Moses's death. This is contrasted with the evidence most biblical scholars use that shows that the Torah seems to appear in history in the 7th century BC at the earliest, centuries after the death of Moses, and other indications that the books were a compendium of stories from multiple authors (see documentary hypothesis and supplementary hypothesis). Patterns of Evidence: The Moses Controversy was released in theaters on March 14, 2019, and has grossed $765,361 in the US as of March 24.

Mahoney’s method of film-making is pretty straight forward. Gather together an ensemble cast of legitimate scholars, then lionize some fringe loon on the outskirts of the academic radar.

— David A. Falk, The Moses Controversy: More So-called Patterns of “Evidence”

== Patterns of Evidence: The Red Sea Miracle ==
Patterns of Evidence: The Red Sea Miracle is a 2020 documentary film in two parts, directed by Tim Mahoney and sequel to Patterns of Evidence: The Moses Controversy. It explores the viewpoints of modern-day scholarship regarding the parting of the Red Sea in the Book of Exodus. Based on his interviews with numerous scholars and religious thinkers (including Barry J. Beitzel, Manfred Bietak, Hershel Shanks, Manis Friedman, and Glen Fritz), Mahoney presents two models of thought for the event: the "Egyptian model" (smaller scale) and the "Hebrew model" (larger scale). Patterns Of Evidence: The Red Sea Miracle was released in theaters on February 18, 2020, and has grossed $696,191 in the US as of May 11.

== Filmography ==
- Patterns of Evidence: Exodus (DVD). St. Louis Park, MN: Thinking Man Films. 2015. OCLC 915833619.
- Patterns of Evidence: The Moses Controversy (DVD). St. Louis Park, MN: Thinking Man Films. 2019. OCLC 1090563625.
- Patterns of Evidence: The Red Sea Miracle (DVD). St. Louis Park, MN: Thinking Man Films. 2020. OCLC 1156664366.

== See also ==
- Crossing the Red Sea
