= Doesn't Anyone Blush Anymore? =

1990 book by Manis Friedman

Doesn't Anyone Blush Anymore? Reclaiming Intimacy, Modesty, and Sexuality
- Author: Rabbi Manis Friedman
- Language: English
- Subject: Relationships, Marriage
- Genre: Non-fiction
- Published: HarperCollins, San Francisco, 1990
- Publication place: United States
- Media type: Print
- Pages: 113
- ISBN: 978-0-060-63029-4

Doesn't Anyone Blush Anymore? is a book on love and intimacy by Rabbi Manis Friedman, a Chabad Hasidic author and lecturer. Friedman maintains that traditional Jewish values and customs concerning intimacy as practiced by many Orthodox Jews are relevant to the general public. The book's title characterizes the feeling of some that the indoctrination of extreme secular sexual values "denaturalized" many American children of their normal sexual inclinations. Friedman emphasizes the individual's responsibility to act appropriately in intimate situations.

== Concepts explored ==
=== Two types of love ===
Friedman distinguishes between the "fiery love" between spouses and the "calm love" between siblings and other family members. According to Friedman, the love between spouses must overcome the differences between the two parties, generating greater intensity in the relationship. By contrast the love between other family members are predicated upon the commonness the two parties share. Freidman further states that husband and wife, male and female, in essence always remain strangers; for this reason the acquired love in the relationship is never entirely consistent.

=== A child's intuition ===
According to Friedman, a young child in a compromising situation with a predatory adult might be helpless to prevent the negative outcome but is intuitively aware of the immodesty and inappropriateness of the adult's behavior.

== Quotes ==
"If you help yourself to the benefits of being married when you are single, you're likely to help yourself to the benefits of being single when you're married."

== Publishing ==
Friedman's book was originally published by HarperCollins under the title Doesn't Anyone Blush Anymore? Reclaiming Intimacy, Modesty, and Sexuality. Later editions by other publishers were published with a different subtitle, Doesn't Anyone Blush Anymore? Love, Intimacy and the Art of Marriage.

== See also ==
- Manis Friedman
- Intimacy
- Gender studies
- Tzniut
