= Sekhemrekhutawy Khabaw =

Egyptian pharaoh of the early 13th Dynasty

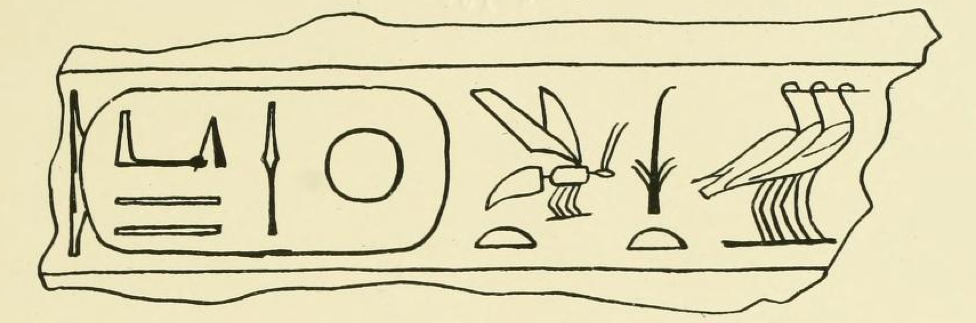
- Drawing by Wallis Budge of a fragment of a red granite architrave discovered in Bubastis and bearing the name of Sekhemrekhutawy Khabaw.

Pharaoh
- Reign: 1–2 years (Baker); 1775–1772 BC (Ryholt); 1752-1746 BC (Schneider)
- Coregency: Hor?
- Predecessor: Hor
- Successor: Djedkheperew
Royal titulary
Horus name
Khabaw
Ḫˁj-b3w
The apparition of the Bas
G5	xa G30
Nebty name
Wehemdjed
Wḥm-ḏd
Permanent renewal
G16	wHm Dd Dd
Golden Horus
Ankhrenput
ˁnḫ-rnpwt
Living of years
G8	anx M4 M4 M4
Prenomen
Sekemrekhutawy
Sḫm-Rˁ-ḫwj-t3wj
Mighty Ra, he who protects the two lands
M23 t L2 t < ra sxm D43 N19 >
Nomen
Unknown, possibly "Sobek"
- Father: Hor?
- Dynasty: 13th Dynasty

Sekhemrekhutawy Khabaw was an Egyptian pharaoh of the early 13th Dynasty during the Second Intermediate Period.

== Attestations ==
Khabaw is well attested through archaeological finds.

=== Bubastis, architrave BM EA 1100 ===
Fragments of a red granite architrave measuring 2 feet 6 inches (0.76 m) by 5 feet 11 inches (1.80 m) bearing his Horus name and prenomen were discovered during excavations at Bubastis in 1891 conducted by Édouard Naville for the Egypt Exploration Society. The architrave is now in the British Museum, under the catalog number BM EA 1100.

=== Tanis, architrave ===
Another architrave discovered in Tanis shows Khabaw's name together with that of pharaoh Hor of the 13th Dynasty. Darrell Baker and Ryholt suggest that this close association might mean that Khabaw was Hor's son and may have been his coregent.

Ryholt and Baker believe that both architraves did not originate from the Delta region but from Memphis. The architraves could have come to their find spots after the fall of the 13th Dynasty, when the Hyksos moved a large number of monuments from Memphis to Avaris and other cities of the Nile Delta such as Bubastis and Tanis. Alternatively, the architraves may have stayed in Avaris until the reign of Ramses II, when this king built his capital at Pi-Ramesses using material from Avaris. Pi-Ramesses was subsequently dismantled during the 21st Dynasty and its monuments scattered in the Delta region.

=== Cylinder-seals ===
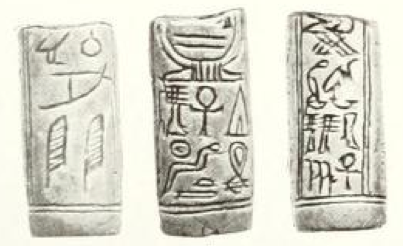
Cylinder-seal of Sekhemrekhutawy Khabaw, Petrie Museum UC 11527.

Khabaw is attested by a cylinder-seal now in the Petrie Museum (UC 11527).

=== Nubia, seal-impressions ===
In Nubia, he is attested by 4 seal impressions from the fortress of Uronarti and one from the fortress of Mirgissa.

== King Lists ==
The Turin canon does not mention Sekhemrekhutawy Khabaw. Nor is he mentioned in any other ancient king list.

Ryholt (1997) argues that Khabaw's name was lost in a wsf (literally "missing") lacuna of the Turin canon reported in Column 7, line 17 of the document. The redactor of this king list, which was written in the early Ramesside period, wrote wsf when the older document from which he was copying the list had a lacuna.

== Identity ==
The nomen of Sekhemrekhutawy Khabaw is unknown and his identity is therefore not completely established. Ryholt has proposed Khabaw's nomen could have been "Sobek", as this nomen is attested from artifacts which must belong to a king of the first half of the 13th Dynasty. Only two kings of this time period have their nomina unknown: Khabaw and Nerikare. "Sobek" may thus possibly be the nomen of Khabaw.

On the other hand, Jürgen von Beckerath identified Khabaw's nomen as Pantjeny, thereby equating Khabaw with Sekhemrekhutawy Pantjeny, who is otherwise attested by a single stele. However, this hypothesis has been invalidated in a recent study of stele by Marcel Marée. Marée has shown that the stele was produced by the same workshop (and possibly the same person) who produced the stelae of Wepwawetemsaf and Rahotep. The latter is firmly dated to the early 17th Dynasty c. 1580 BC and thus Pantjeny must have ruled c. 1600 BC, possibly at the end of the 16th Dynasty. Alternatively, Pantjeny could be a member of the Abydos Dynasty, which ruled over central Egypt from c. 1650 BC until 1600 BC.

Wolfgang Helck and Stephen Quirke have equated Sekhemrekhutawy Khabaw with Sekhemrekhutawy Sobekhotep, called Sobekhotep I or Sobekhotep II depending on the scholar. This hypothesis is considered incorrect by most Egyptologists including von Beckerath, Detlef Franke, Ryholt and Anthony Spalinger Von Beckerath and Franke point out that although both kings have the same throne name, their other names are completely different. Spalinger argues that the Nile records of Nubia associated to Sekhemrekhutawy Sobekhotep cannot be attributed to Khabaw. Responding to these arguments, Stephen Quirke pointed out that the Horus and gold names of Sekhemrekhutawy Sobekhotep are known from a single block from Medamud, the attribution of which is not entirely certain.

== Theories ==
According to the egyptologist Kim Ryholt, he was the sixteenth king of the dynasty, reigning for three years, from 1775 BC until 1772 BC. Thomas Schneider, on the other hand, places his reign from 1752 BC until 1746 BC. Alternatively, Jürgen von Beckerath sees him as the third king of the dynasty. As a ruler of the early 13th Dynasty, Khabaw would have ruled from Memphis to Aswan and possibly over the western Nile Delta.

== See also ==
- List of pharaohs

Preceded by Hor	Pharaoh of Egypt; Thirteenth Dynasty	Succeeded by Djedkheperew
