= Tomb CS4 =

Unidentified royal tomb from the Second Intermediate Period at Abydos, Egypt

CS4
- Burial site of unknown
- Location: Abydos
- Discovered: 1901/1902 (originally), 2013/2014 (re-excavated)
- Excavated by: Arthur Weigall (originally), Josef W. Wegner (re-excavated)

Tomb CS4 is a royal tomb at Abydos in Egypt that dates to the Second Intermediate Period. The name of the king buried here is unknown, but belonged most likely to the disputed Abydos Dynasty.

The tomb was first discovered by Arthur Weigall in 1901/1902 and then re-excavated and fully recorded in 2013/2014 under the direction of Josef W. Wegner. The tomb is located close to the burial of king Senebkay and is of about the same size. With several other, most likely royal tombs it was built into a large enclosure that dates to the 13th Dynasty and might have been an unfinished royal tomb. Only the underground chambers of Tomb CS4 are preserved. There were most likely also superstructures with chapels, but those are totally gone. The 12 m long tomb consists as found of three chambers and an entrance corridor. The chambers were once paved with reused limestone slabs, but most of them are gone. No decoration was preserved and there were very few finds in the tomb. The occupant's name had not yet been found in the structure, possibly due to the action of tomb robbers. Weigall mentions remains of a male skeleton. The king buried here remains unknown.

== Bibliography ==
- Josef Wegner, Kevin Cahail: King Seneb-Kay's Tomb and the Necropolis of a Lost Dynasty at Abydos (University Museum Monograph, 155), Philadelphia 2021 ISBN 978-1-949057-09-6
