= Abydos Dynasty =

Hypothetical Ancient Egyptian dynasty

- c. 1650 BC–c. 1600 BC
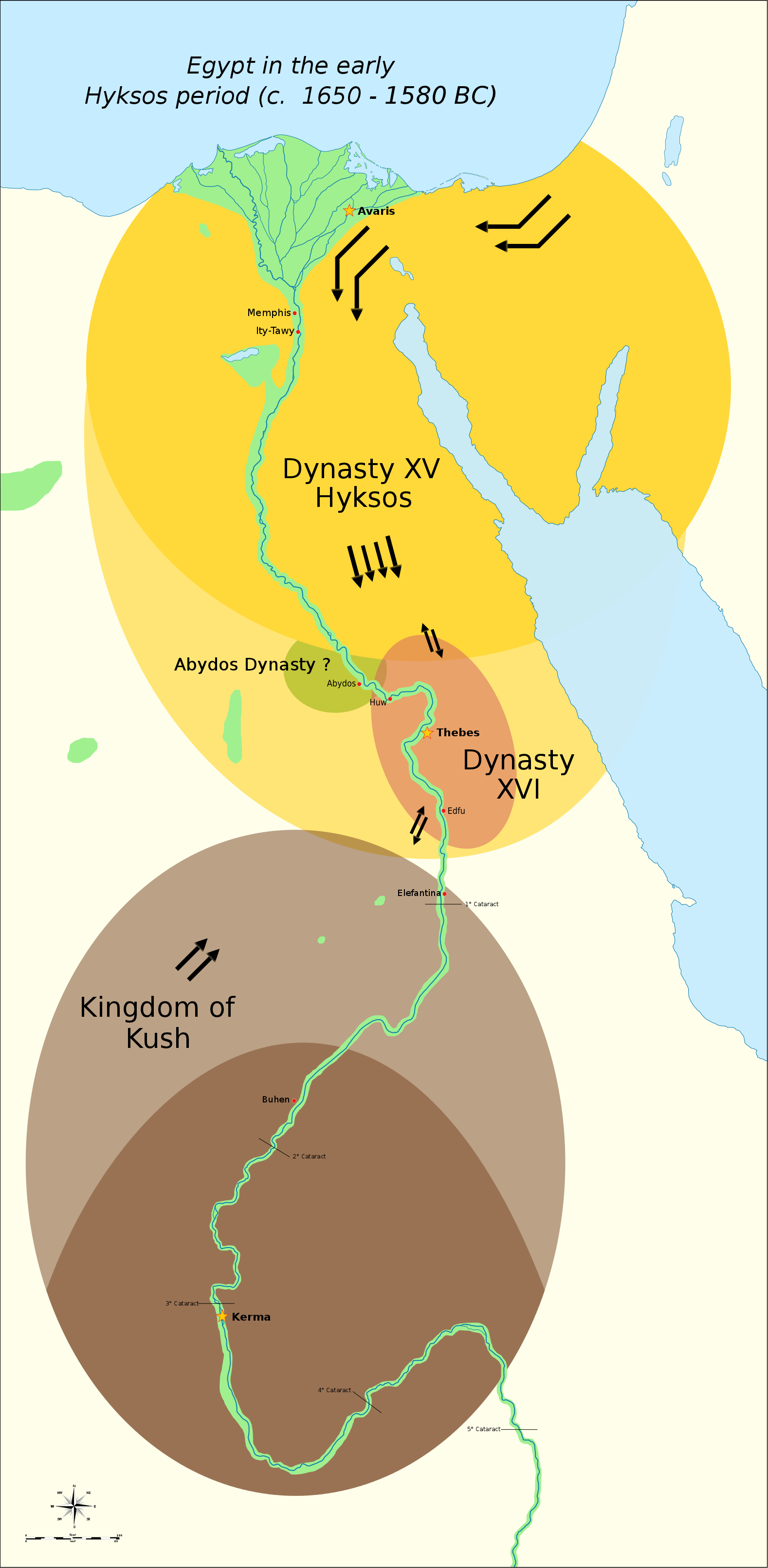
- Map of Egypt during the Fifteenth, Abydos, and Sixteenth Dynasties
- Capital: Abydos
- Common languages: Egyptian language
- Religion: Ancient Egyptian religion
- Government: Absolute monarchy
- Historical era: Bronze Age
  - Established: c. 1650 BC
  - Disestablished: c. 1600 BC
Preceded by	Succeeded by
Thirteenth Dynasty of Egypt; Fourteenth Dynasty of Egypt	Seventeenth Dynasty of Egypt

The Abydos Dynasty is hypothesized to have been a short-lived local dynasty ruling over parts of Middle and Upper Egypt during the Second Intermediate Period in Ancient Egypt. The Abydos Dynasty would have been contemporaneous with the Fifteenth and Sixteenth Dynasties, from approximately 1650 to 1600 BC. It would have been based in or around Abydos and its royal necropolis might have been located at the foot of the Mountain of Anubis, a hill resembling a pyramid in the Abydene desert, close to a rock-cut tomb built for pharaoh Senusret III.

== Debate over existence ==
=== Evidence in favor ===
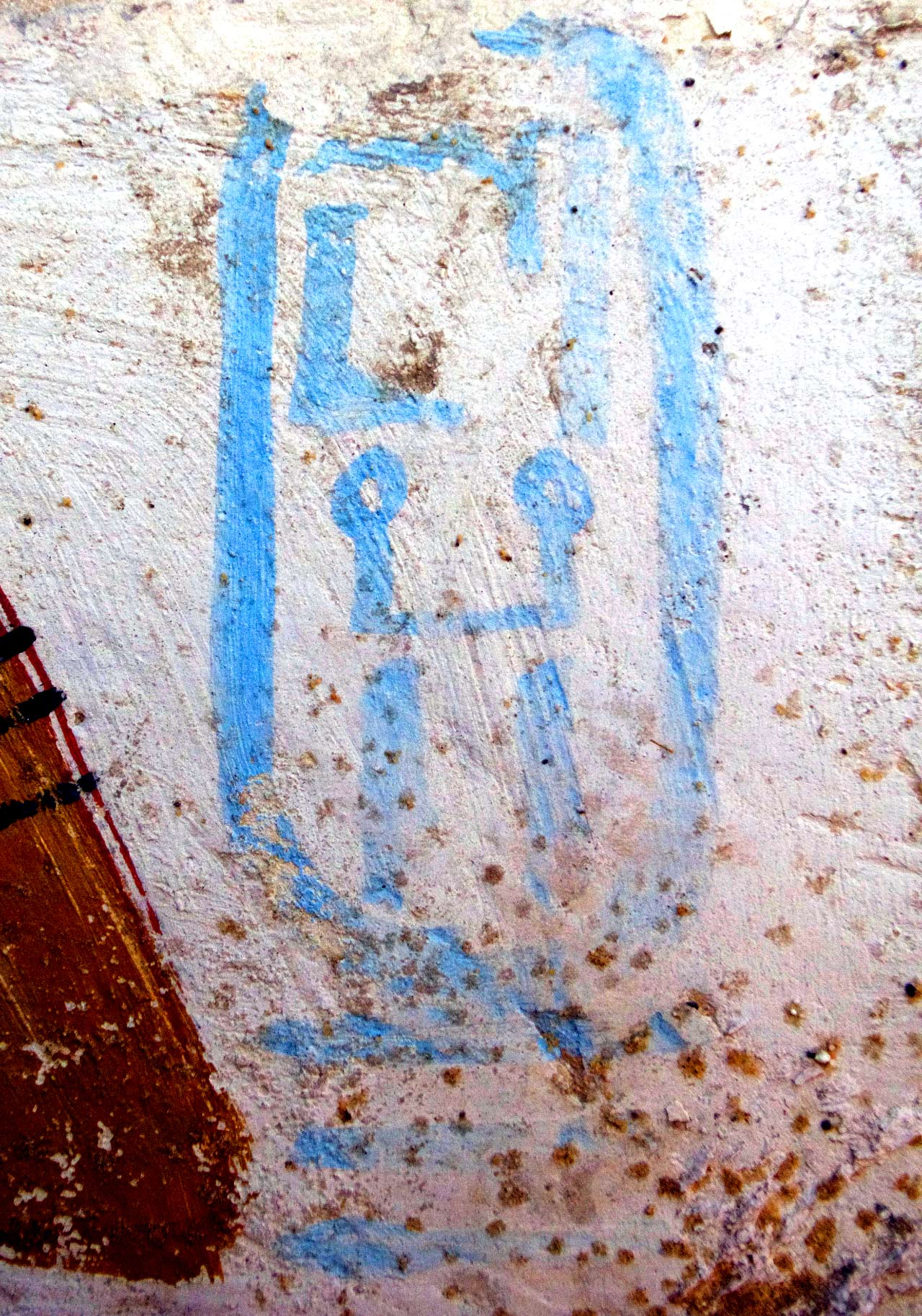
The cartouche of pharaoh Woseribre Senebkay, inside the king's burial tomb.

The existence of an Abydos Dynasty was first proposed by Detlef Franke and later elaborated on by Kim Ryholt in 1997. Ryholt observes that two attested kings of this period, Wepwawetemsaf (Wepwawet is his protection) and Pantjeny (He of Thinis), bore names in connection with Abydos: Wepwawet being an important Abydene god and Thinis being a prominent city, located a few miles north of Abydos. Additionally, Wepwawetemsaf, Pantjeny and Snaaib, another king of the period, are each known from single stelae discovered in Abydos, which could be a sign that this was their seat of power. Finally, Ryholt argues that the existence of an Abydos Dynasty would explain 16 entries of the Turin canon at the end of the 16th Dynasty. The Abydos Dynasty may have come into existence in the time lapse between the fall of the 13th Dynasty with the conquest of Memphis by the Hyksos and the southward progression of the Hyksos to Thebes.

The existence of the dynasty may have been vindicated in January 2014, when the tomb (CS9) of the previously unknown pharaoh Senebkay was discovered in the southern part of Abydos, an area called "Anubis Mountain" in ancient times. If Senebkay indeed belongs to the Abydos Dynasty, his tomb might signal the royal necropolis of this dynasty, adjacent to the tombs of the Middle Kingdom rulers. Since then, excavations have revealed no less than eight anonymous royal tombs dating to the Second Intermediate Period similar in style and size to Senebkay's burial, including Tomb CS4, as well as two tombs, possibly pyramids, dating to the mid 13th-Dynasty, S9 and S10, which may belong to Neferhotep I and his brother Sobekhotep IV. In 2025, the discovery of another royal tomb at the "Anubis Mountain" was announced; this tomb was a little older than Senebkay's but much larger. However, the occupant's name had not yet been found in the heavily damaged structure, possibly due to the action of tomb robbers. The excavators linked the tomb to the early Abydos Dynasty, and believe that the tomb belongs to a predecessor to Senebkay because the tomb was built in a section of the necropolis that the researchers believe was established earlier in time.

=== Evidence against ===
The existence of an Abydos Dynasty is not agreed by all scholars. For example, Marcel Marėe observes that a workshop operating from Abydos and producing stelae for two kings associated with the Abydos Dynasty, Pantjeny and Wepwawetemsaf, also likely produced the stela of Rahotep of the 17th Dynasty. Thus if the Abydos Dynasty did exist, this workshop would have been producing stelae for two enemy dynasties, something which he judges to be rather unlikely. It remains unclear, however, whether these two dynasties coexisted at any one time: for instance, in Ryholt's reconstruction of the Second Intermediate Period, they are separated by c. 20 years.

Countering the argument in favor of the Abydos Dynasty based on the tomb of Senebkay, Alexander Ilin-Tomich argues that certain Middle Kingdom pharaohs, such as Senusret III and Sobekhotep IV, also have their tombs at Abydos, yet nobody places these kings into an Abydos-based dynasty. Instead, he wonders whether Senebkay might be a king of the Theban 16th Dynasty.

== Territory ==
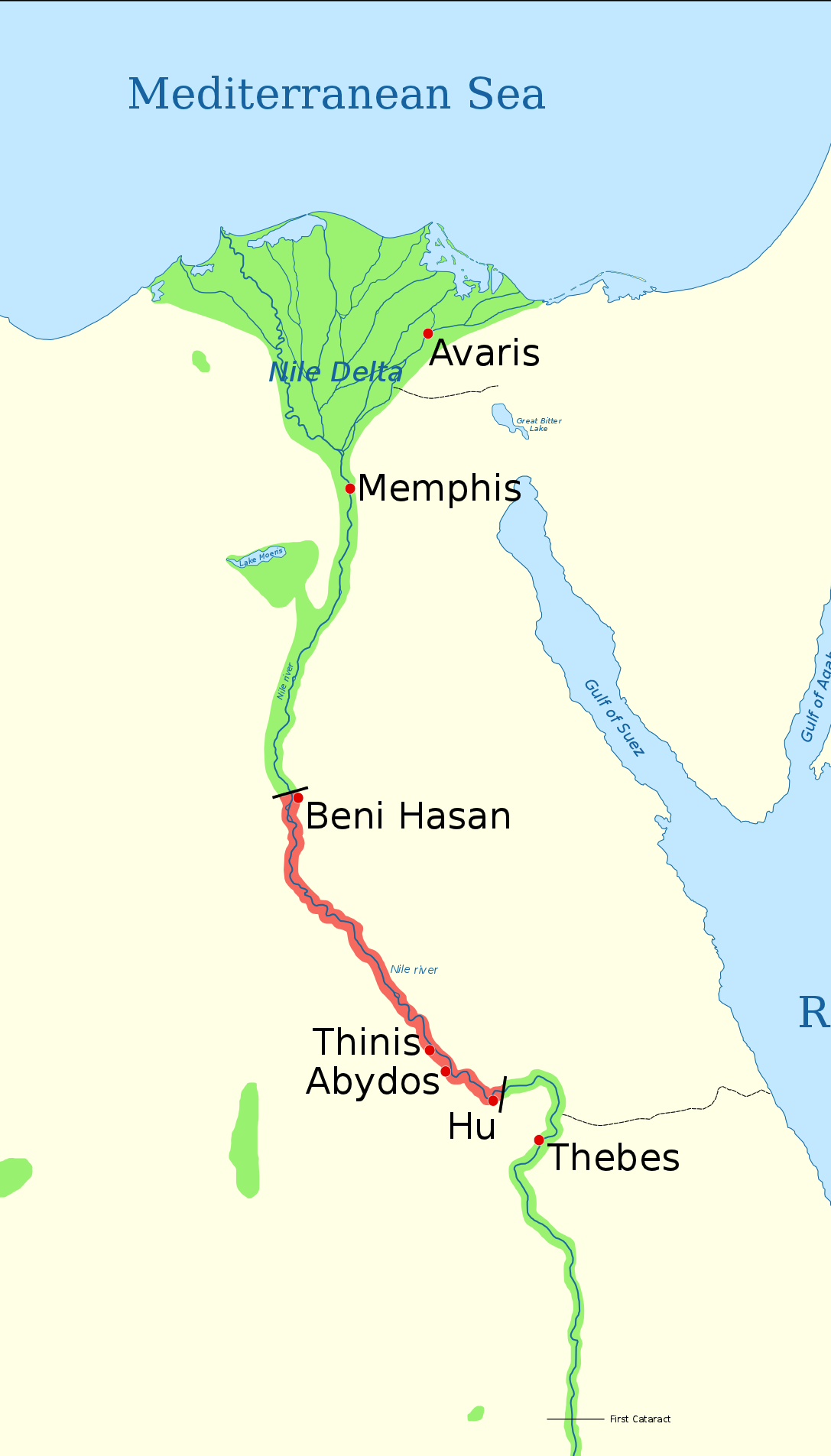
In red, the possible extent of power of the Abydos Dynasty

If the Abydos Dynasty was indeed a dynasty, the seat of its power would probably have been either Abydos or Thinis. A possible graffito of Wepwawetemsaf was discovered by Karl Richard Lepsius in the tomb BH2 of the 12th Dynasty nomarch Amenemhat at Beni Hasan, about 250 km North of Abydos, in Middle Egypt. If the attribution of this graffito is correct and if Wepwawetemsaf did belong to the Abydos Dynasty, then its territory might have extended that far north. Since the dynasty was contemporaneous with the 16th Dynasty, the territory under Abydene control could not have extended farther than Hu, 50 km south of Abydos.

== Rulers ==
The following 16 entries of the Turin canon are attributed to the Abydos Dynasty by Kim Ryholt:

Pharaohs of the Abydos Dynasty
Prenomen of the King	Entry of the Turin canon	Transliteration
Woser[...]re	Col 11. Line 16	Wsr-[...]-Rˁ
Woser[...]re	Col 11. Line 17	Wsr-[...]-Rˁ
Eight kings lost	Col 11. Lines 18-25	
[...]hebre	Col 11. Line 26	[...]-hb-[Rˁ]
Three kings lost	Col 11. Lines 27-29	
[...]hebre (uncertain)	Col 11. Line 30	[...]-ḥb-[Rˁ]
[...]webenre	Col 11. Line 31	[...]-wbn-[Rˁ]

Some of the above rulers may identify with the four attested kings tentatively attributable to the Abydos Dynasty, given here without regard for their (unknown) chronological order:

Pharaohs of the Abydos Dynasty
Name of king	Image	Comment
Sekhemraneferkhau Wepwawetemsaf		May belong to the late 16th Dynasty
Sekhemrekhutawy Pantjeny		May belong to the late 16th Dynasty
Menkhaure Snaaib		May belong to the late 13th Dynasty
Woseribre Senebkay		Perhaps identifiable with a Woser[...]re of the Turin canon
Khuiqer		Uncertain date and period of reign, attributed by Detlef Franke to the Abydos Dynasty

== Sources ==
- Reid, Donald Malcolm (2003). Whose Pharaohs? Archaeology, Museums, and Egyptian National Identity from Napoleon to World War I. University of California Press. ISBN 9780520240698.
