= Wah-Sut =

- Wah-sut-Khakaure-maa-kheru-em-Abdju
- Location within Egypt
- 26°10′38″N 31°55′53″E
- Type: Government planned Settlement and Mortuary Temple Complex
- Periods: late Middle Kingdom Twelfth Dynasty to Thirteenth Dynasty
- Location: Egypt, South of Abydos
- Region: Upper Egypt
- Part of: Abydos

History
- Built: Twelfth Dynasty
- Abandoned: possibly at the end of the Thirteenth Dynasty or after the Eighteenth Dynasty

Site notes
- Archaeologists: Charles Trick Currelly and Arthur Weigall (1901-1903) Josef W. Wegner 1994-present

Wah-Sut (Ancient Egyptian: Wah-sut-Khakaure-maa-kheru-em-Abdju, meaning Enduring are the places of Khakaure justified in Abydos) is a town located south of Abydos in Middle Egypt. The name of the town indicates that it was originally built as an outlying part of Abydos, set up by the Egyptian state as housing for the people working in and around the funerary complex of pharaoh Senusret III (fl. c. 1850 BCE) of the Twelfth Dynasty, at the peak of the Middle Kingdom.

This complex consists of the mortuary temple, the town of Wah-Sut, and a tomb dug into the bed-rock beneath the Mountain of Anubis, a nearby hill with a pyramidal shape. The town continued to exist for at least another 150 years, well into the Thirteenth Dynasty, when it was close to a royal necropolis of the tombs of Neferhotep I and Sobekhotep IV (fl. c. 1730 BCE). A document attests to its existence during the much later New Kingdom.

wAH st t pr niwt
wꜣḥ s(w)t
in hieroglyphs
Era: New Kingdom
(1550–1069 BC)

wAH st t Z2 < ra xa kA Z1 > mA Aa11 xrw
wꜣḥ s(w)t ḫꜥ kꜣ rꜥ mꜣꜥ ḫrw
in hieroglyphs
Era: New Kingdom
(1550–1069 BC)

wAH st Z3A ra xa kA kA kA Aa11 xrw m Ab b Dw
wꜣḥ s(w)t ḫꜥ kꜣw rꜥ mꜣꜥ ḫrw m abḏw
in hieroglyphs
Era: Middle Kingdom
(2055–1650 BC)

== Archaeology ==
In 1901–1902, Charles Trick Currelly, Arthur E. P. Weigall, Ayrton and Flinders Petrie found Senusret III's temple and tomb. Their first season in South Abydos, they discovered the hidden tomb and a temple on the edge of the cultivation that is on axis. They excavated the surrounding necropolis, including the royal tombs S9 and S10.

The next archaeologist to work at South Abydos came in 1994. Josef Wegner, working under David O. Connor, began his fieldwork in South Abydos in 1991. In 1994, he discovered part of the town at South Abydos. Ever since, he has been working on the town and mortuary temple, which later came to be known as Wah-Sut.

== Senusret III complex ==
=== Mortuary temple ===
The mortuary temple of Senusret III is located outside Wah-Sut's town walls to the north along the cultivation line. It was used by the cult of Senusret III to honor him after his death. A town built by the government was nearby to house those who used and took care of the temple. Archeological evidence shows that the temple was used to honor the King. This evidence comes the temple construction as well as the surrounding areas.

The temple was built of limestone with a mudbrick exterior wall. The main entrance consisted of a mudbrick pylon with a gate entrance. Leading up to the gate was a causeway leading from the cultivation. This entrance seemed to be used only during cult rituals. Side doors led into the temple for all other access. The main entrance led to the central court used only for cult activities and special occasions. The temple interior consisted of three main chambers each devoted to a different function. Interior streets were used to access the chambers on either side of the central chamber. This was meant to keep the central chamber sacred.

The west block consisted of housing and administrative quarters, separated into three different units, consisting of multiple rooms of different sizes. In the rooms thought to be housing units, they found hearths and domestic ceramics. Ceramics used for cooking dated to the later part of the Twelfth Dynasty. This helped point to these rooms' functions. A waste deposit, called a refuse, was found along the outside of the west temple walls. Inside this refuse, they found pottery used for cooking and household practices as well as administrative seals and other debris. The seals suggest that this section of the temple housed administrative employees. Administrative personnel likely worked in the west block, such as the temple overseer, phyle director, and temple scribe and their helpers.

The east block was composed of five separate units that were not as preserved as the west block. The east block seemed to be used for both long and short-term storage for cult activities, preparation for priesthood and cult activities and post-ritual activities. Much of the info about the east block came from its refuse deposit, which was located directly behind the east side of the temple. It contained large amounts of ceramics (most of them intact), animal bones and mud jar stoppers. Much of what was found seemed to come from the cult activities.

A separate refuse deposit served the central chamber. It was in front and to the side of the main entrance. Its ceramics were all similar, which made it look like the trash came from cult activities. Many beaker jars were found representing liquid offerings, most likely beer. Many administrative seals were there. Between the temple and the town a production field was found. An area full of pottery sherds was found covering almost 6,000 square meters. Pottery linked to the production of bread and beer were found in abundance. A building not far from the eastern temple entrance, which seemed to be linked to the storage in the galleries of the east block. About 50 meters east of the temple appears to host another building cluster that was possibly used as supply and storage rooms for the production area. This production area seems to have been used for temple activities.

=== Hidden tomb ===
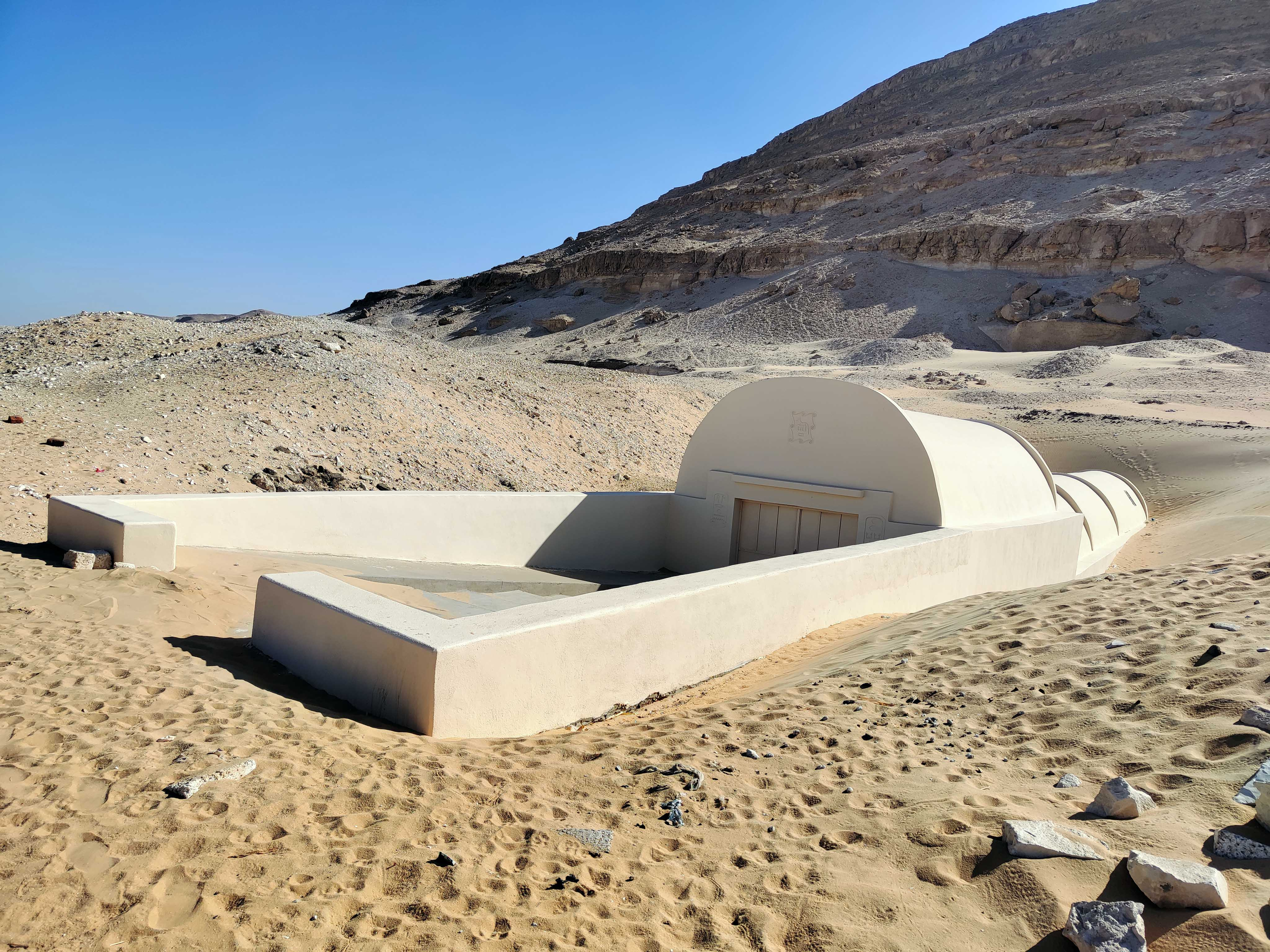
Modern Entrance to the Tomb of Senusret III, Abydos

The tomb is situated at the base of the desert cliffs surrounded by a t-shaped mudbrick enclosing wall. Weigel deduced who the tomb belonged to from its orientation on axis with Senusret III's Mortuary Temple. Currelly discovered a 170 meter long subterranean tomb leading under the gebel (cliff).

When discovered, the tomb had been plundered. The walls and ceiling of the first main chamber were made of fine white limestone blocks. The ceiling looked to be of carved long poles placed side by side. It was exquisitely carved. Off of this chamber were two long passages into the cliffs. These rooms were not lines in stone, but the rock was carefully cut out and roughly polished. They were both large, and reach the end of the tomb. In the limestone chamber, the plunderers apparently chiseled into the walls and ceilings looking for treasure.

When they broke through the ceiling they found another passageway above it. This area was set up like the first set, with chambers on either side. The main passage lines were in fine white limestone and the ones off of it were polished. Behind the walls of one of these rooms, another passageway was found. This “plug” was 64 feet from the outer passage and was pure granite. The plunderers had to create a tunnel under it to get through. They also made a tunnel to the side of the plug and ended up dropping into yet another room. This was lined with blocks of quartzite sandstone the exact size of the walls. Beyond this was another passageway made up natural rock. This led to the final room which was again lines with the same quartzite sandstone. In this room, lay a great sarcophagus made of red granite. Inside was a canopic box made of granite with a quartzite lid. Alabaster dishes were found smashed, likely by the plunderers, along the inside, but no body was found. No inscriptions were found in the tomb or on the sarcophagus. It's currently believed the plundering occurred at the end of the Thirteenth Dynasty.

=== Town ===
The town of Wah-Sut was found in 1901–1902. Currelly believed them to be part of the New Kingdom temple of Ahmose. The house appear to be equidistant from the Senusret III temple and that of Ahmose, next to where Building A was found. More than 90 years later, Wegner found more of the town, establishing the mansions found by Currelly as a part of the elite houses. The first part of the town discovered was the Northwest building, which later came to be known as the Mayor's house. The town is laid out on the cubit system, where both Building A and larger houses were laid out in blocks of 100 cubits in width with a street 5 cubits in width in between every 2 sets of paired houses. Building A forms the town's southwest corner. The southwest corner has not been located. In 1999, the front of Building A was found, along with a 5 cubit street running east–west. Much of ancient Wah-Sut lies under the modern town and cultivation area.

==== Mayor’s House ====
The Mayor's House, (Building A), was found in 1994. During the first couple seasons, 1994 and 1997, Wegner and his team uncovered a majority of the building. The main area of the building is the central residence. The main entrance of the residence is a columned portico off of a large courtyard. Beyond the portico are three large rooms, which are the main part of the residence. Off of the main rooms are nine smaller rooms and a smaller courtyard. The smaller rooms would have been the sleeping chambers and related rooms. The courtyard attached to the portico was paved like the rest of the central residence and seemed to be used for food preparation and storage based on the storage bins built into the outside walls, the amount of pottery found littered around, and the amount of organic material. Behind the main residence is office space used by the mayor and his administration.

Wegner uncovered a 10-block granary, a series of secondary storage structures, activities performed on the west side, and excavated the Northwest corner. This block-style granary shows up in the archaeological record only during the Twelfth Dynasty. It served as a high volume, functioning granary based on deposits found inside the rooms. The size and location of the granary, next to the large central courtyard, suggests that the mayoral residence ran the town economy and the smaller residences depend on it for their grains. The granary was later transformed into residences for a woman named Reniseneb, who was a king's daughter, during the Thirteenth Dynasty, while the courtyard was turned into a granary court.

The external west side of Building A included a water supply chamber. The water supply chamber was a subterranean room with thick walls, littered with broken-necked water jars. An extreme amount of nabaq seeds (fruit trees that can be used in bread, eaten alone, or used for medicine). Many of the fruits were decomposed on the ground, implying that they did not seem to be used for nutrition. They seem to be used as windbreaks from the desert or gardening.

==== Elite houses ====
The ‘’’Elite houses’’’ at Wah-Sut are found along the grid with the Mayor's house. They are labeled B-F. These houses are large, but not quite as large as the Mayor's house. They are situated in sets of four, each 100 cubits in size. The houses were exact copies of each other, smaller versions of the central residence of the Mayor's house. The entrance of the main residence of these two houses is a portico followed by three main rooms. Beyond those rooms are the subsidiary rooms and living quarters. Each house has a courtyard in front of the portico and some administrative rooms, like the Mayor's house.

The mansions found Currelly are on axis with the Mayor's house. As seen in the town map, for the most part, they are set up exactly like Buildings B and D. For these reasons as well as the proximity to the Wah-Sut site they are believed to be a part of the town.

==== Birth brick ====
The birth brick is a magical item used in childbirth. One such brick was found, which is mentioned many times in texts. It is made of unfired brick measuring 17x35 cm and painted with divine images. It is used to magically protect child and mother. The bottom face depicts a mother holding her child, flanked by two women who seem to be midwives and priestesses of Hathor who have helped the mother give birth. Behind them is the symbol of Hathor, a horned cow head perched upon a stick. Hathor is closely related to fertility and childbirth. The other four sides that have been somewhat preserved depict zoomorphic and anthropomorphic deities, which are also found on the magic wands that were often made of hippopotamus ivory. The symbols that were preserved enough to analyze include a serval and a couple of goddesses. The striding wildcat on the lower left corner of side E is one that is fully present on the brick. The cat is an iconic symbol of solar incarnation in Egypt. This again ties into the magic wands of the Middle Kingdom. An image of a nude goddess holding two snakes in her hands is important. Although her head has not been preserved, she faces forward and is a goddess based on her sky blue body. She looks similar to some found on magic wands, although only a few are available for comparison. She is similar to the “mistress of animals” found in Mesopotamia who is always shown in full frontal nudity either flanked by or grasping animals. The side of the birth brick, which seems to be the top and the most important, did not survive.

The birth brick could have been used as a meskhenet brick. These bricks were used in the physical birthing process. A set of four bricks were set up, two bricks stacked together and laid out parallel to each other. The pregnant woman stood on them and squatted to give birth. While this was happening, a magic spell might have been cast to protect the child as is done with the magic wands. The birth brick was found in Building A in the northwest quadrant in the seven room residential area.

== Second Intermediate Period Tombs ==
Next to the tomb of Senwosret III, several 13th dynasty kings and kings of the Second Intermediate Period were also buried. This includes the tomb of Seneb-kay who was likely wounded in battle. These kings may have been the same period who oversaw the robbing of the tomb of Senwosret III. They are now referred to as the Abydos Dynasty of Kings controlling parts of Middle Egypt during the Second Intermediate Period.
