= Idudju-iker =

Idudju-iker (fl. c. 2050 BC) was an ancient Egyptian high official who lived in the 11th Dynasty. His title foremost one of the chiefs of Lower Nubia demonstrates his important position in the administration of Lower Nubia.

Idudju-iker is only known from the fragments of a stela found reused in the Second Intermediate Period tomb of king Senebkay at Abydos. On the stela, Idudju-iker bears the titles sole friend, count and hereditary prince (smr waty, haty-a, iry-pat) but is also called foremost one of the chiefs of Lower Nubia (HAt HqAw nw wAtwAt). The first three titles place him high in the social hierarchy, while the latter title is so far unique. He was evidently the highest official in charge of Lower Nubia. The stela contains an autobiography of Idudju-iker that is heavily destroyed. Lower Nubia and the land of the Medjay are mentioned and the text also refers to many rituals that Idudju-iker performed at Abydos.

On stylistic grounds, the stela can be dated under the 11th Dynasty king Intef II. From several texts it is known that the king conquered Abydos, an event that had a high symbolic importance. Although the texts on the stela are heavily destroyed, Josef Wegner concludes that Nubian soldiers perhaps under Idudju-iker were part of the military forces that seized the city.
