= Sebkay =

Egyptian pharaoh during the Second Intermediate Period

- Sebekay, Sebekāi
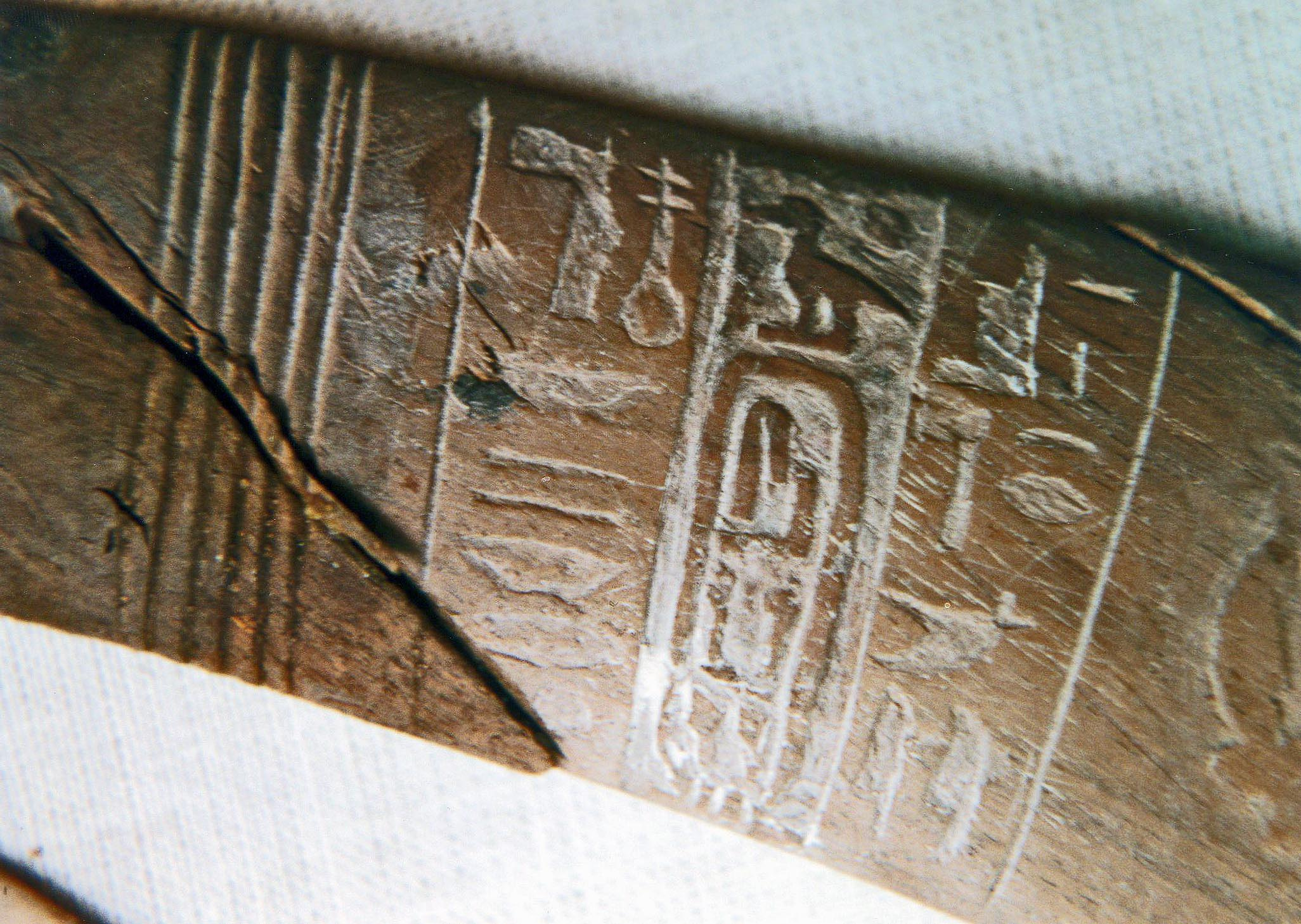
- Closeup of the ivory wand showing the king's name.

Pharaoh
- Reign: uncertain date
- Predecessor: Djedkheperew
- Successor: Sedjefakare Kay Amenemhat VII
Royal titulary
Nomen
Sebkay
Sb-k3jj

G39 N5	s D58 kA i i
- Dynasty: 13th Dynasty

Sebkay (alternatively Sebekay or Sebekāi) was an ancient Egyptian king during the Second Intermediate Period. For a long time his position created problems and he was most often placed into the 13th Dynasty. However, the discovery of the tomb of a king with the name Senebkay make it very likely that Sebkay is identical with the latter and the writing of the name Sebkay is just a misspelling of the name.

Very little is known about him, since his name is attested only on a wooden birth Tusk (wand) found at Abydos and now in the Cairo Museum (CG 9433 / JE 34988).

== Identity ==
Since the discovery of the wand, several Egyptologists have tried to identify this king with other rulers of the Second Intermediate Period. Stephen Quirke believed that “Sebkay” was a diminutive for “Sedjefakare”, which is the throne name of Kay-Amenemhat, while Jürgen von Beckerath considered the name a short form of the nomen “Sobekhotep” instead. Thomas Schneider supports von Beckerath's hypothesis, specifying that the king Sobekhotep likely was Sobekhotep II.

A more radical hypothesis came from Kim Ryholt, who suggested the reading "Seb's son Kay", de facto splitting the name "Seb-kay" in two different pharaohs and thus filling a gap in the Turin King List before Kay-Amenemhat. Furthermore, in this reconstruction the name of the last mentioned king should be considered a patronymic too, and must be read "Kay's son Amenemhat", thus setting a dynastic line consisting of three kings: Seb, his son Kay, and the latter's son Amenemhat. Ryholt's interpretation is considered daring and controversial by some egyptologists.

In 2014, at Abydos, a team of archaeologists discovered the tomb of a previously unknown king of the Second Intermediate Period, called Senebkay. It has been suggested that this ruler and Sebkay might be the same person.

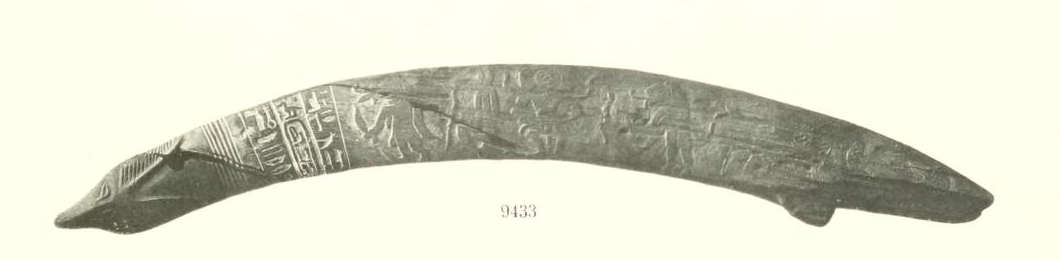
Full view of the ivory wand. Sebkay's name is carved on the left side.
