= Pantjeny =

Egyptian pharaoh during the Second Intermediate Period

- Pentjeny, Penthen, Pantini, Pentini
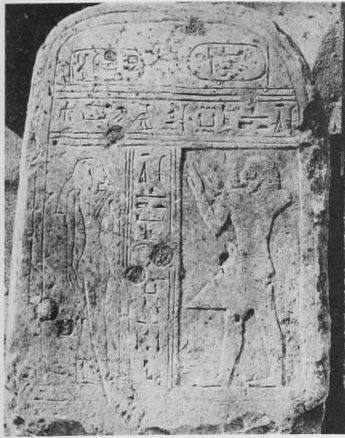
- Limestone stele depicting prince Djehuti-Aa and princess Hotepneferu and bearing the cartouches of pharaoh Sekhemrekhutawy Pantjeny.

Pharaoh
- Reign: uncertain 17th century BC
Royal titulary
Prenomen
Sekhemrekhutawy
Sḫm-Rˁ-ḫwj-t3wj
Mighty Ra, he who protects the two lands
< ra sxm D43 N19 >
- Children: Possibly Djehuty-Aa and Hotepneferu
- Dynasty: possibly belonging to the Abydos Dynasty or late 16th Dynasty

Sekhemrekhutawy Pantjeny was an Egyptian pharaoh during the Second Intermediate Period. According to the Egyptologists Kim Ryholt and Darrell Baker, he was a king of the Abydos Dynasty, although they leave his position within this dynasty undetermined. Alternatively, Pantjeny could be a king of the late 16th Dynasty. According to Jürgen von Beckerath, Pantjeny is to be identified with Sekhemrekhutawy Khabaw, whom he sees as the third king of the 13th Dynasty.

== Attestation ==
=== Stela BM EA 630 ===
Pantjeny is known from a single limestone stela "of exceptionally crude quality" found in Abydos by Flinders Petrie. The stela is dedicated to the king's son Djehuty-aa ("Thoth is great") and to the king's daughter Hotepneferu. The stela is in the British Museum under the catalog number BM EA 630. The stela was produced by a workshop operating in Abydos.

Other stelae produced by this workshop belong to king Rahotep and king Wepwawetemsaf. All three kings reigned therefore quite close in time.

== Theories ==
In his study of the Second Intermediate Period, Kim Ryholt elaborates on the idea originally proposed by Detlef Franke that following the collapse of the 13th Dynasty with the conquest of Memphis by the Hyksos, an independent kingdom centered on Abydos arose in Middle Egypt. The Abydos Dynasty thus designates a group of local kinglets reigning for a short time in central Egypt. Ryholt notes that Pantjeny is attested by a single find from Abydos and furthermore that his name means "He of Thinis", a prominent city a few miles north of Abydos. Thus he concludes that Pantjeny most likely ruled from Abydos and belongs to the Abydos Dynasty. As such, Pantjeny would have ruled over parts of central Egypt and would have been contemporary with the 15th and 16th Dynasties.

The Egyptologist Marcel Marée rejects Ryholt's hypothesis and instead holds that Pantjeny is a king of the late 16th Dynasty. Indeed, Marée notes that the workshop which produced Pantjeny's stela is also responsible for the production of the stelae of Wepwawetemsaf and Rahotep, the latter reigning in the early 17th Dynasty. Marée therefore concludes that Rahotep, Pantjeny and Wepwawetemsaf reigned quite close in time. This reasoning also precludes the existence of an Abydos Dynasty c. 1650 BC.
