= Snaaib =

Egyptian pharaoh

- Senaaib, Sena'aib, Sennaib, Snaiib
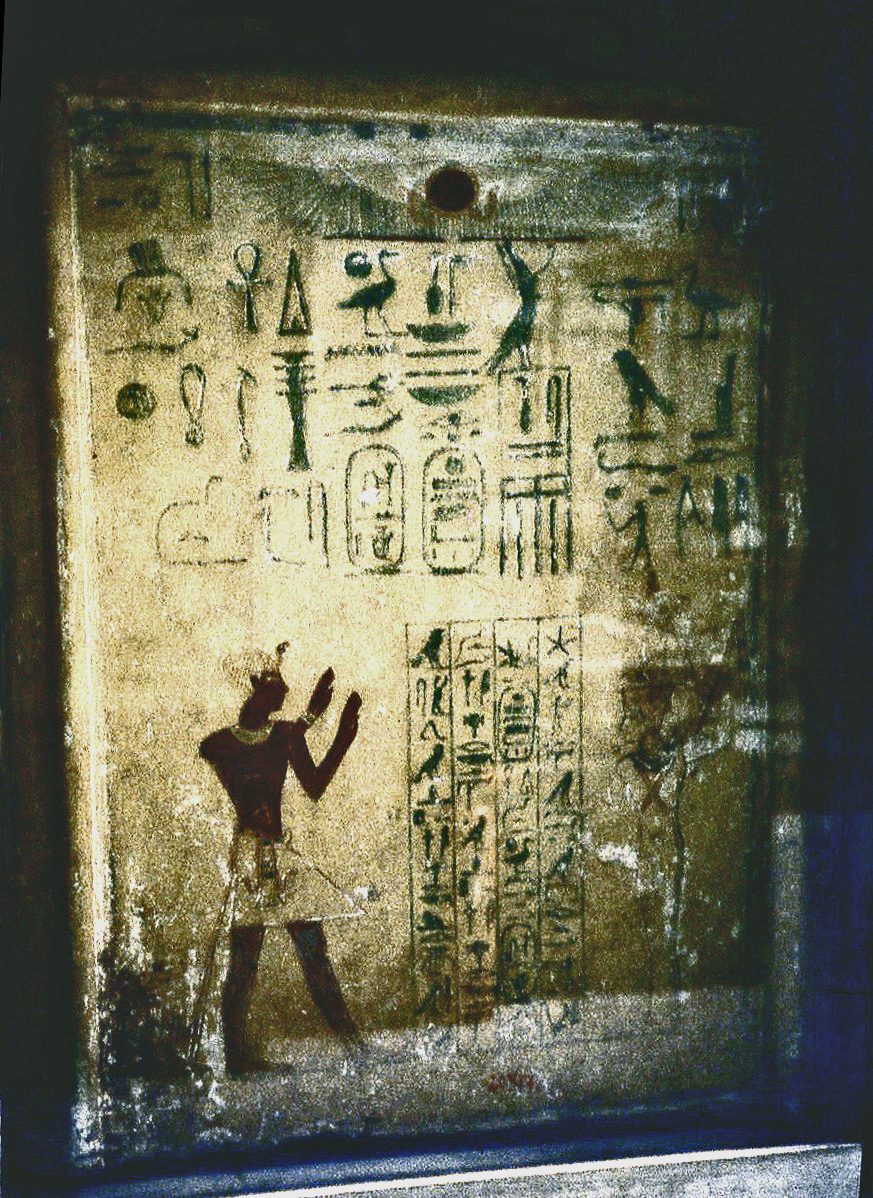
- Stele of Snaaib, on display at the Egyptian Museum, Cairo

Pharaoh
- Reign: Uncertain, 17th century BCE
Royal titulary
Horus name
Sewadjtawy
S.w3ḏ-t3wy
He who causes the two lands to flourish
G5	s wAD N16 N16
Prenomen
Menkhaure
Mn-ḫˁw-Rˁ
Established are the apparitions of Ra
M23 t L2 t < N5 mn n N28 D36 Z2 >
Nomen
Snaaib
Snˁˁ-ib
Calm of heart
G39 N5 < Y4 Y1 ib Z1 >
- Dynasty: possibly the Abydos Dynasty or near the end of the 13th Dynasty or late 16th dynasty

Menkhaure Snaaib was an Egyptian pharaoh during the Second Intermediate Period between the Middle Kingdom and New Kingdom at the end of the Middle Bronze Age.

== Attestations ==
=== Stela CG 20517 ===
In Abydos (Kom es-Sultan) a stela dedicated to the worship of the god Min-Horus-nakht dating to the reign of Snaaib was found. It is a painted limestone stele "of exceptionally crude quality". The stele gives the nomen, prenomen, and Horus names of the king. It also shows him wearing the Khepresh crown and adoring the god Min. The stele is the earliest known depiction of the Khepresh being worn.

Another ruler wearing the Khepresh Crown during this period was Neferhotep III.

== Theories ==
According to Egyptologists Kim Ryholt and Darrell Baker he was a king of the Abydos Dynasty, although they leave his position within the dynasty undetermined. Alternatively, Jürgen von Beckerath sees Snaaib as a king reigning near the end of the 13th Dynasty.

In his study of the Second Intermediate Period, Ryholt elaborates on the idea originally proposed by Detlef Franke that following the collapse of the 13th Dynasty with the conquest of Memphis by the Hyksos, an independent kingdom centered on Abydos arose in Middle Egypt. The Abydos Dynasty thus designates a group of local kinglets reigning for a short time in central Egypt. Ryholt notes that Snaaib is only attested by his stele from Abydos and may thus belong to this dynasty. This conclusion is shared by Darrell Baker but not by von Beckerath, who places Snaaib near the end of the 13th Dynasty.
