= Khonsuemheb and the Ghost =

Ancient Egyptian ghost story

Khonsuemheb in hieroglyphs
x n sw w m H b W4
ḫnsw-m-ḥb

Turin fragment of the story. Museo Egizio, S.6619

Khonsuemheb and the ghost, often known simply as A ghost story, is an ancient Egyptian ghost story dating back to the Ramesside period. Its protagonist is a priest named Khonsuemheb (also rendered as Khonsemhab, in either cases meaning "Khonsu is in jubilation") and the story revolves around his encounter with a restless ghost.

== Plot ==
The beginning of the story is lost, but is implied that an unnamed man had to spend the night next to a tomb in the Theban Necropolis, only to be awakened by a ghost residing in it. Thus, the man went to the High Priest of Amun, Khonsuemheb, and told him about his adventure.

The text begins with Khonsuemheb calling the gods from his rooftop, in order to summon the ghost. When the ghost comes, Khonsuemheb asks his name, and the ghost claims to be Nebusemekh, son of Ankhmen and of the lady Tamshas. Khonsuemheb offers to rebuild a new tomb and provide a gilded Ziziphus–wood coffin for the ghost in order to make him peaceful, but the ghost is unpersuaded of the high priest's intentions. Khonsuemheb, sitting next to the ghost, cries and wishes to share his unfortunate fate by depriving himself of food, water, air and daylight.

Then Nebusemekh tells of his past life, when he was an overseer of the treasuries and military official under pharaoh Rahotep. When he died in the summer of regnal year 14 of pharaoh Mentuhotep, this ruler provided him with a canopic set, an alabaster sarcophagus and a ten-cubits shaft tomb. However, over the centuries the tomb partially collapsed, thus allowing the wind to reach the burial chamber. He also revealed that before Khonsuemheb, others offered to rebuild his grave without actually honoring their promise. Khonsuemheb says to the ghost that he will comply with any of his requests and offers to send ten of his servants to make daily offerings at his grave, but the ghost laments that the latter idea is of no use.

At this point the text breaks and the next fragment reports the efforts of three men sent by Khonsuemheb in search of a suitable place to build a new tomb for the ghost. They eventually find the ideal place at Deir el-Bahari, near to the causeway of the mortuary temple of pharaoh Mentuhotep II. The men return to Karnak, where Khonsuemheb is officiating, and report to him about the place they found. Then, the joyful Khonsuemheb informs the deputy of the estate of Amun, Menkau, about his plan.

The text suddenly ends here, but it is likely that Khonsuemheb succeeded in his plan of pacifying the ghost.

== Fragments ==
The story, written during the 19th–20th Dynasty, is fragmentary due to the fact that it has been reconstructed from different ostraka which are now in Turin (Museo Egizio, n. S.6619), Vienna (Kunsthistorisches Museum, inv. n. 3722a), Paris (Louvre, n. 667+700) and two in Florence (National Archaeological Museum, n. 2616, 2617). The Turin fragment was the last to be discovered (in 1905 at Deir el-Medina by Ernesto Schiaparelli), thus Gaston Maspero in 1882 gave a different reconstruction of the tale. The reading order of the ostraka has been established as follows:

- Turin, since the beginning;
- Vienna, since Khonsuemheb's first proposal;
- Florence 1 and 2, since Khonsuemheb's wish to share the ghost's fate;
- Louvre, the final part after the break, concerning the search for a new burial place.

The tale contains various obscure points which were and still are open to different interpretations. One of those concerns the identity of the two pharaohs claimed to be contemporary of Nebusemekh. The first one is apparently Rahotep, an early king of the 17th Dynasty, while the second one, Mentuhotep, is a problematic figure, since no Theban ruler bearing this name and living near the time of Rahotep is believed to having reigned up to 14 years. Jürgen von Beckerath believed that both the royal names actually refers to Rahotep, while William Kelly Simpson suggested that the original author intended to refer to Mentuhotep II of the 11th Dynasty, who is mentioned also later in the story; Simpson argues that the author was rather ignorant in Egyptian history, since Mentuhotep II ruled some five centuries before Rahotep.

In ancient Egypt ghosts (called akh) were somewhat similar to their former self, and interactions between ghosts and living people were seen in a lesser supernatural way than in modern depictions.

== Bibliography ==
- Gardiner, Alan H. (1981) [1932]. Late-Egyptian stories. Bruxelles: Fondation egyptologique Reine Elisabeth., also containing a hieroglyph transcription of the story.
- Simpson, William K. (1972). Simpson, William Kelly (ed.). The Literature of Ancient Egypt: An Anthology of Stories, Instructions, and Poetry. translations by R.O. Faulkner, Edward F. Wente, Jr., and William Kelly Simpson. New Haven and London: Yale University Press. ISBN 0-300-01711-1.
