= Birth tusk =

Wand used in ancient Egypt to ward off evil

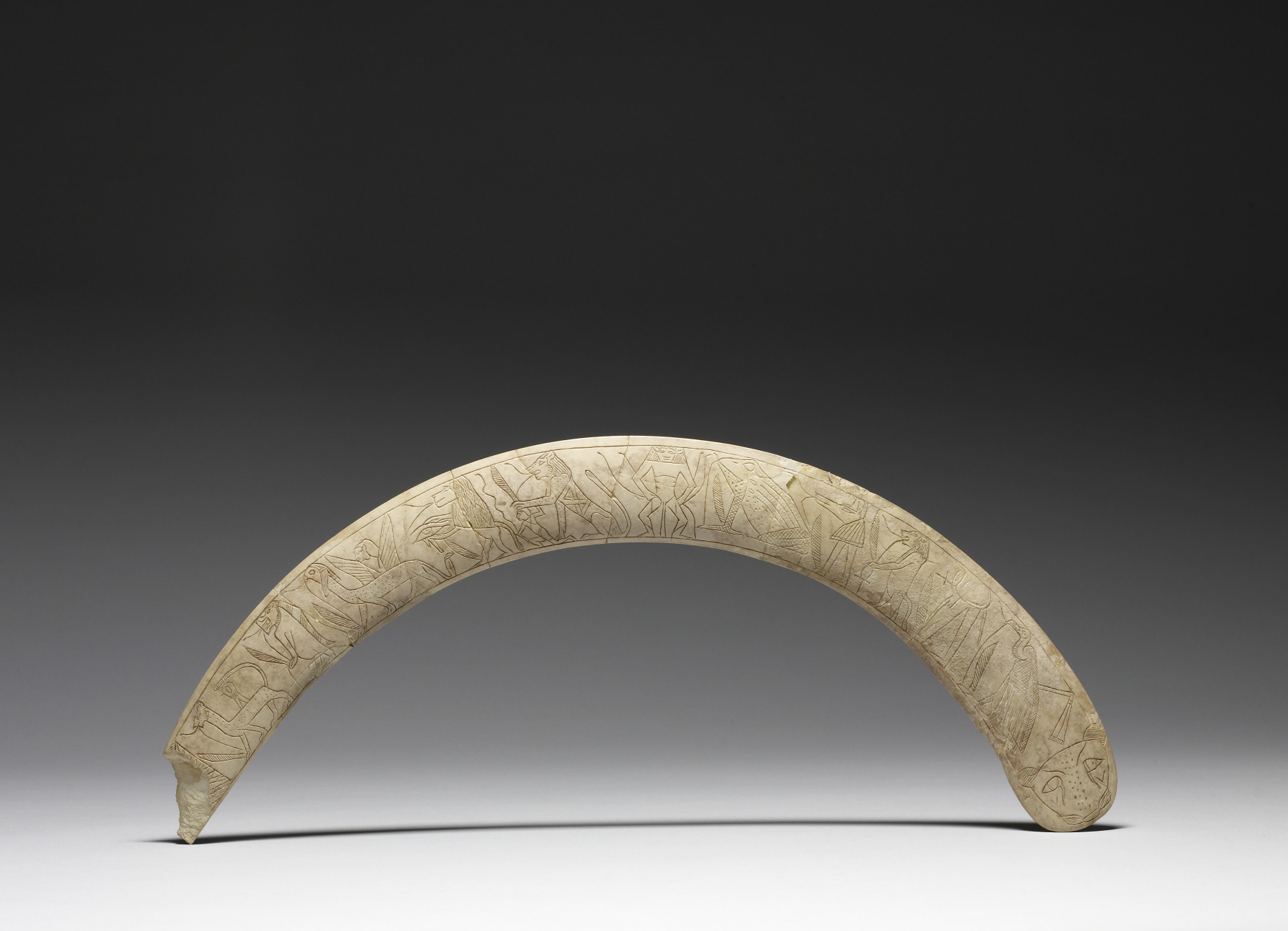
Birth tusk in the Walters Art Museum

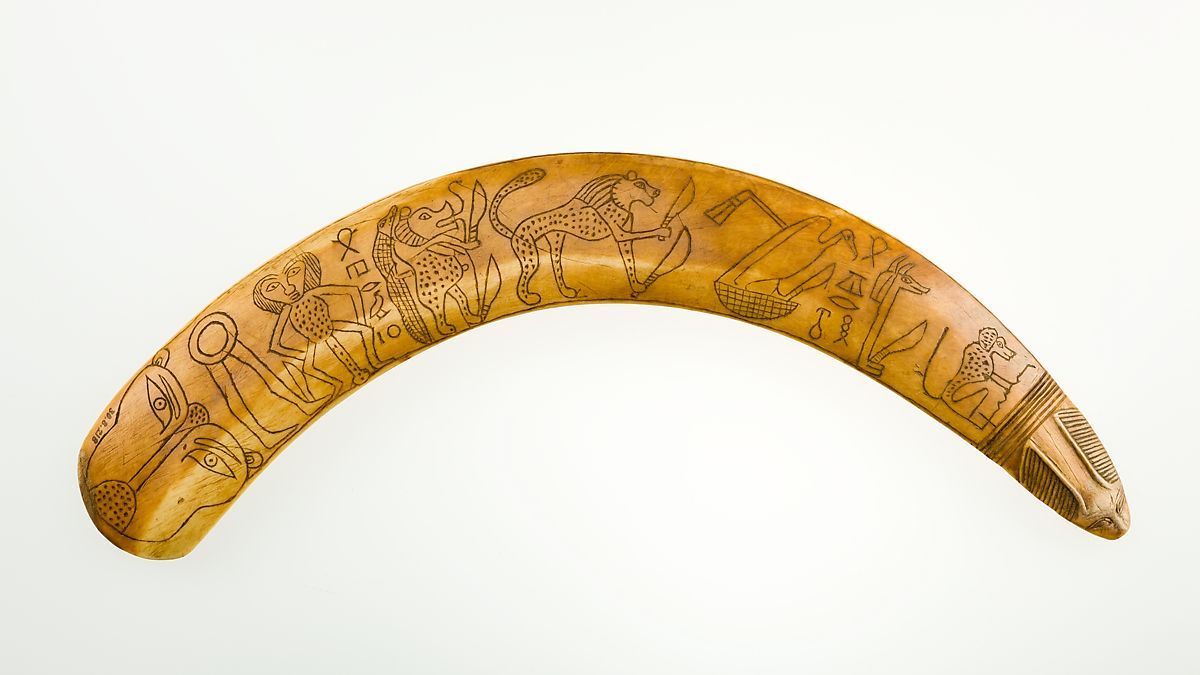
Apotropaic Wand at the Metropolitan Museum of Art

Amuletic wand at the British Museum

Birth tusks (also called magical wands or apotropaic wands) are wands for apotropaic magic (to ward off evil), mainly from the Middle Kingdom of Egypt. They are most often made of hippopotamus ivory (Taweret, represented as a bipedal hippopotamus, is the goddess of childbirth and fertility), are inscribed and decorated with a series of figures. Most of these tusks were found in burials at Thebes, Lisht, Abydos and at other places, but a few examples were also found at settlements, such as Wah-Sut or Avaris, but also in Ugarit and Megiddo.

Some of the birth tusks bear short inscriptions and these always relate to the protection of high-status women and children. The tusks are often decorated on both sides. They show a series of figures, most of them deities connected with motherhood and child birth. The hippopotamus goddess Ipi (an early form of Taweret) is common; other figures appearing on them are double sphinxes, snakes, standing lions, naked women with lion heads, vultures and sun disks with legs. No two tusks are decorated with an identical selection of figures.

There are a few depictions of birth tusks in art. These are always shown in the hands of nurses, confirming the impression that they were mainly used in birth rituals, protecting mother and child. The decorated birth tusks seem to all belong to the late Middle Kingdom up to the Second Intermediate Period. The latest datable example belongs to the Second Intermediate Period king Senebkay and was found in a tomb of that period at Abydos.
