= Wepwawetemsaf =

Egyptian pharaoh

- Apuatemsaf, Oupouaout, Upwautemsaf, Wepwawemsaf
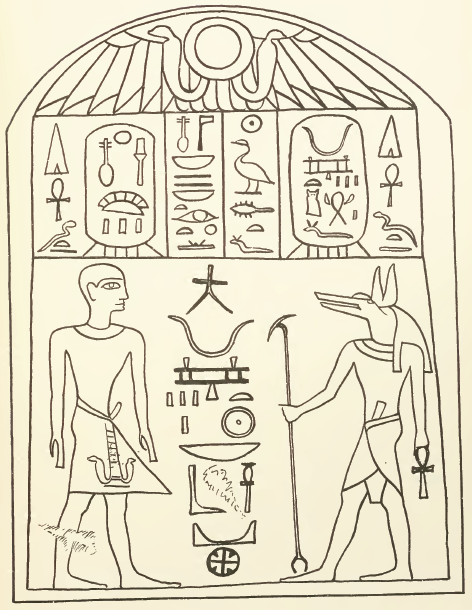
- Stele of Wepwawetemsaf, drawing made in 1913 by Wallis Budge

Pharaoh
- Reign: Uncertain, 17th century BCE
Royal titulary
Prenomen
Sekhemreneferkhau
Sḫm-RꜤ Nfr-ḫꜤw
Mighty Ra, he whose apparitions are perfect
M23 t L2 t < N5 sxm nfr N28 Z2 >
Nomen
Wepwawetemsaf
Wp-wꜢwt-m-sꜢ.f
Wepwawet is his protection
G39 N5 < F13 t N31 Z2 m V17 Z1 f >
- Dynasty: possibly the Abydos Dynasty, the late 13th Dynasty or the late 16th Dynasty.

Sekhemre Neferkhau Wepwawetemsaf was an Egyptian pharaoh during the Second Intermediate Period.

According to the Egyptologists Kim Ryholt and Darrell Baker, he was a king of the Abydos Dynasty, although they leave his position within this dynasty undetermined. Alternatively, the Egyptologist Jürgen von Beckerath sees Wepwawetemsaf as a king of the late 13th Dynasty, while Marcel Marée proposes that he was a king of the late 16th Dynasty.

== Attestations ==
The only contemporaneous attestation of Wepwawetemsaf's reign is a limestone stele "of exceptionally crude quality" discovered in Abydos and now in the British Museum (EA 969). The stele shows the king before the god "Wepwawet, lord of Abydos" and is generally described as of poor workmanship. The stele was produced by a workshop operating in Abydos. Other steles produced by this workshop belong to king Rahotep and king Pantjeny. The Egyptologist Marcel Marée therefore concludes that these three kings reigned quite close in time. He believes that the stele of Pantjeny was made by a different artist, while the steles of Rahotep and Wepwawetemsaf were carved by the same man. He argues that Wepwawetemsaf reigned directly after king Rahotep. He does not assign single kings to specific dynasties, but comes to the conclusion that these kings belong to the late 16th or very early 17th Dynasty.

Another possible attestation of this king is a graffito discovered in tomb no. 2 at Beni Hasan belonging to the 12th Dynasty nomarch Amenemhat and located about 250 kilometres (160 mi) north of Abydos, in Middle Egypt. The graffito has been tentatively read by Beckerath as "Sekhemreneferkhau" but this remains uncertain as the original is now lost.

== Theories ==
Graffito from Beni Hasan, possibly attributable to Wepwawetemsaf.

In his study of the Second Intermediate Period, Kim Ryholt elaborates on the idea originally proposed by Detlef Franke that following the collapse of the 13th Dynasty with the conquest of Memphis by the Hyksos, an independent kingdom centered on Abydos arose in Middle Egypt. The Abydos Dynasty thus designates a group of local kinglets reigning for a short time in central Egypt. Ryholt notes that Wepwawetemsaf is only attested in central Egypt and that his name comprises the theophoric reference to the Abydene god Wepwawet. Thus he concludes that Wepwawetemsaf most likely ruled from Abydos and belongs to the Abydos Dynasty. This conclusion is shared by Darrell Baker but not by Beckerath, who places Wepwawetemsaf in the late 13th Dynasty.

The Egyptologist Marcel Marée also rejects Ryholt's hypothesis and instead holds that Wepwawetemsaf is a king of the late 16th Dynasty. Indeed, Marée notes that the workshop which produced Wepwawetemsaf's stele is also responsible for the production of the steles of Pantjeny and Rahotep, the latter most often assigned to the early 17th Dynasty. Marée therefore concludes that Rahotep, Pantjeny and Wepwawetemsaf reigned quite close in time. This reasoning also precludes the existence of an Abydos Dynasty c. 1650 BC.
