= S 10 (Abydos) =

Ancient Egyptian tomb in Abydos

S10
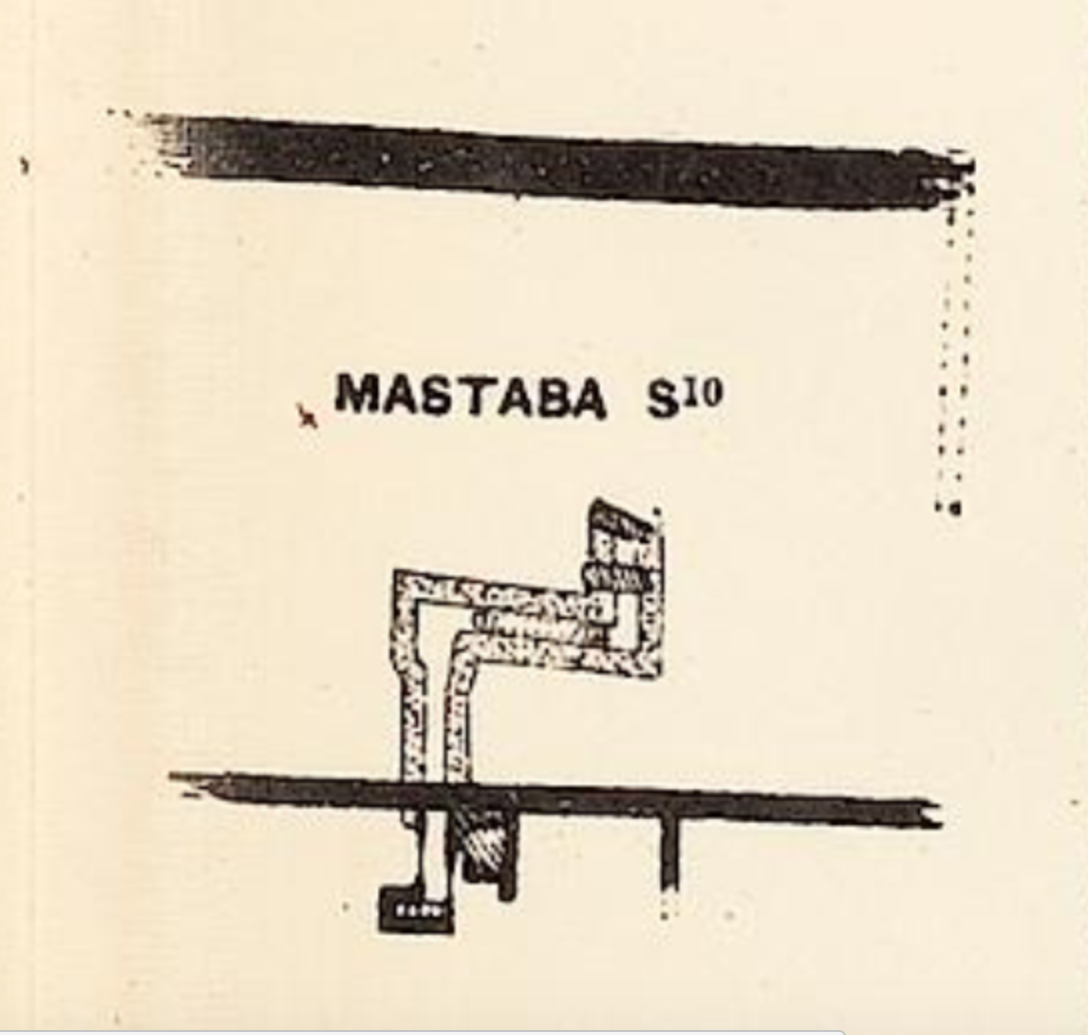
- Plan of tomb S10 as drawn by Ayrton, Weigall and Petrie, who thought it was a mastaba Possible burial site of Sobekhotep IV
- Interactive map of S10
- 26°10′16″N 31°55′27″E
- Type: Tomb
- Location: Sohag, Egypt

History
- Built: c. 1730 BC

Site notes
- Material: Limestone
- Area: Enclosure wall housing Z-shaped subterranean chambers, now exposed, possibly once capped by a pyramid
- Excavation dates: 1901-1902 by Edward Ayrton, Arthur Weigall, and William Petrie; 2003; 2014 by Josef Wegner

S 10 (also Abydos-south S10) is the modern name given to a monumental ancient Egyptian tomb complex at Abydos in Egypt. The tomb is most likely royal and dates to the mid-13th Dynasty. Finds from nearby tombs indicate that S10 suffered extensive state-sanctioned stone and grave robbing during the Second Intermediate Period, only a few decades after its construction, as well as during the later Roman and Coptic periods. These finds also show that S10 was used for an actual burial and belonged to a king "Sobekhotep", now believed to be king Sobekhotep IV. According to the Egyptologist Josef Wegner who excavated S10, the tomb might originally have been capped by a pyramid, although Aidan Dodson states that it is still unclear whether S10 was a pyramid or a mastaba.

== Description ==
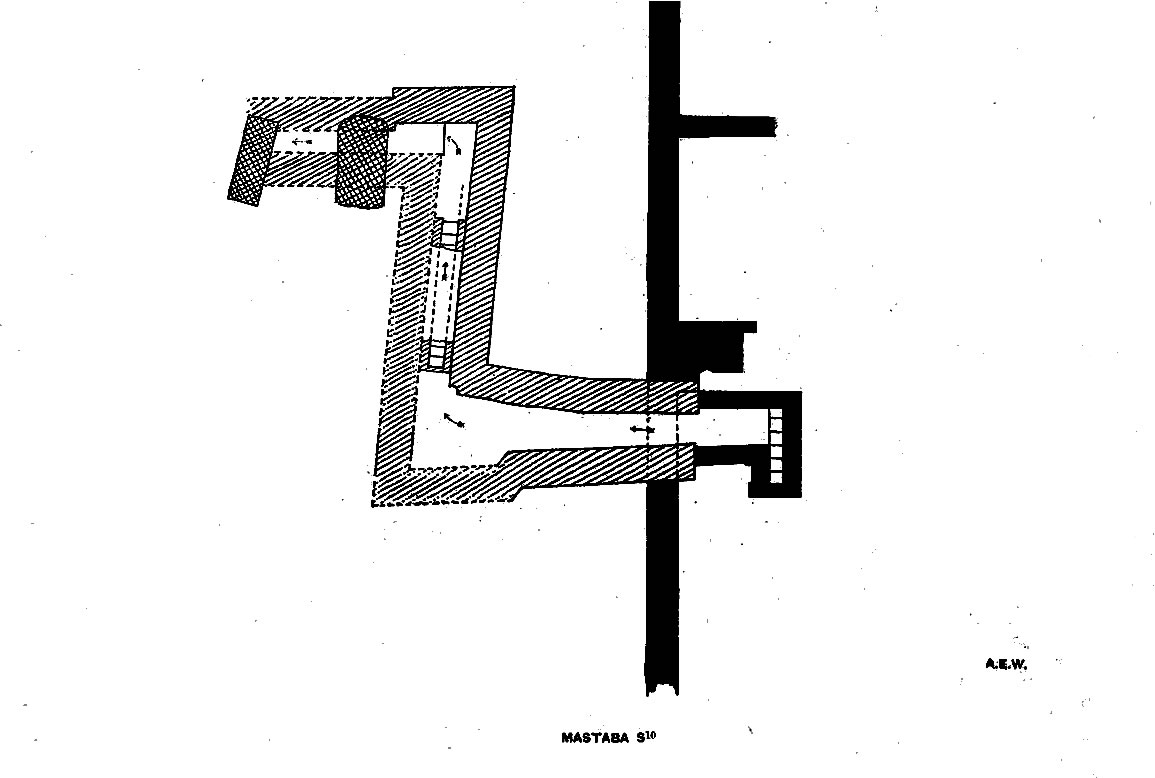
Abydos, plan of tomb S10, as published in 1904

The tomb structure is part of a royal necropolis dating back to the late Middle Kingdom – Second Intermediate Period, which is located close to the ancient town of Wah-Sut, next to the much bigger funerary complex of Senusret III of the 12th Dynasty, at the foot of the so-called Mountain of Anubis, a natural hill in the form of a pyramid.

It was first excavated from 1901-1902 by Edward Ayrton, Arthur Weigall, and William Petrie, who found it heavily looted and disturbed.

The complex consists of a rectangular brick walled structure, some 40 m × 30 m (131 ft × 98 ft) in size, described by the first excavators as a mastaba, who however gave no evidence supporting this classification. At the north side there is an entrance to a system of underground and limestone paved corridors leading to the burial chamber that was found heavily destroyed. More recent excavations discovered fragments of a canopic jar, demonstrating that the tomb was once used. There is evidence that the tomb was already heavily looted in the Second Intermediate Period. A massive (60-ton) red quartzite sarcophagus quarried at El-Gabal el-Ahmar near modern Cairo, most likely originally located in this tomb, was found in a later royal tomb in the same necropolis (tomb CS6). Planks from the cedar coffin from tomb S10 were reused by king Senebkay into a canopic box for his own neighboring burial (tomb CS9). The coffin was inscribed on the outside with Coffin Texts spells 777-785. Only few parts of the texts survived, but coffins with these spells are typical for the late Middle Kingdom at Abydos. On the fragments there appears the name of the king Sobekhotep.

Nothing was found of the superstructure, but it is possible that there was a pyramid on top. Several fragments of a funerary stele were also found on site, however much of the stele was most likely reused in the adjacent intrusive tomb of king Senebkay, and none of the fragments were found in context. On the fragments of the stela appears again the name Sobekhotep.

== Attribution ==
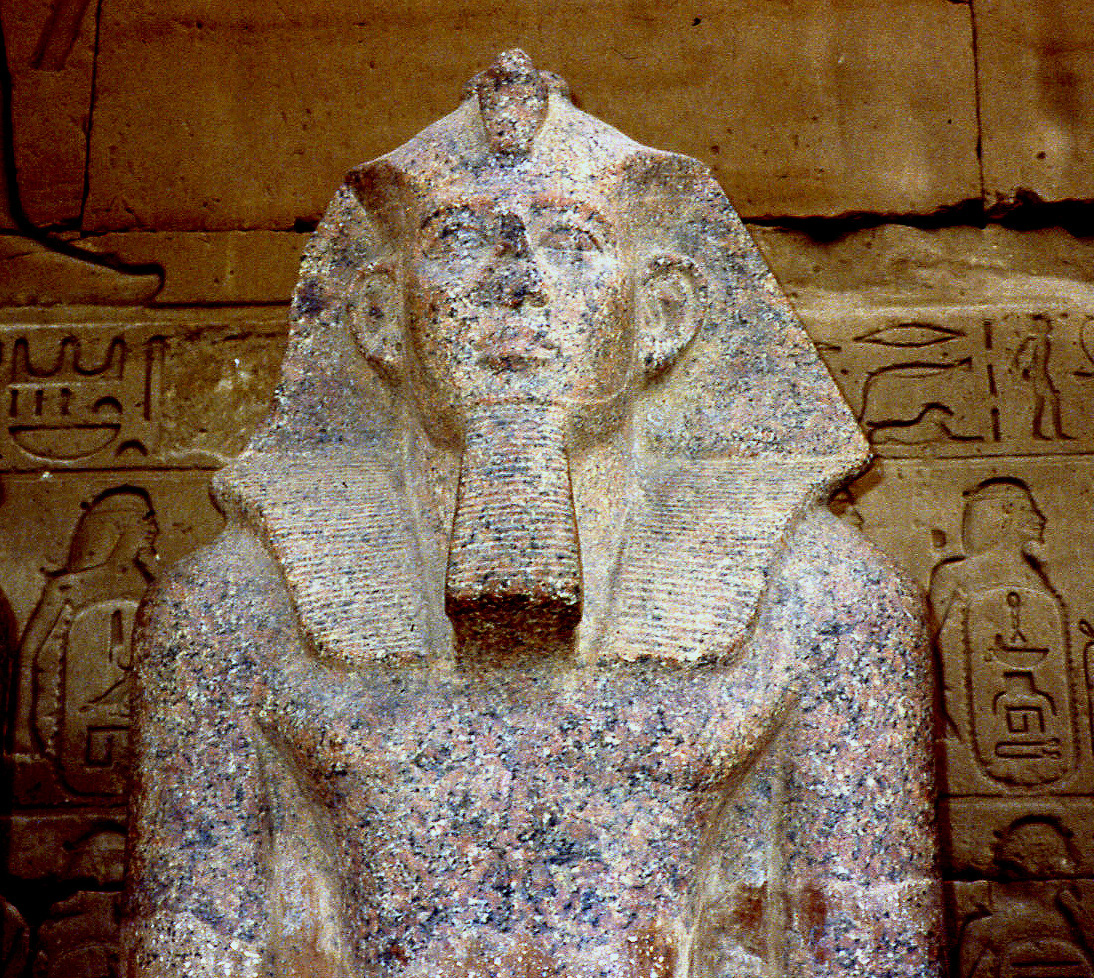
Statue of Sobekhotep IV, for whom S10 might have been built

Since the discovery of the tomb and until 2015, it was unknown who was buried here. Excavations in 2003 and in 2014 made it very likely that the structure was once a royal tomb. At the latter date, during the excavation directed by Josef Wegner of the University of Pennsylvania, a fragment of a funerary tomb stela bearing a relief naming a king Sobek[hotep] was found inside the enclosure, on the eastern side of the complex, close to where a small funerary chapel might once have existed. While in early press reports, published just after the discovery, king Amenemhat Sobekhotep I was named as the possible owner of the tomb, further analyses now indicate that this might belong to Sobekhotep IV instead.

Indeed, not only do the fragments of wooden sarcophagus uncovered indicate a late Middle Kingdom date for the construction of S10, but its size means that its owner would have had to reign for long enough to complete it. This only leaves Sobekhotep III, IV, and VI as possibilities, with Sobekhotep IV being the most likely as he enjoyed the longest reign of these three kings. In addition, Sobekhotep IV is the only one of these kings for whom it is known with certainty that he undertook other works in Abydos. As a corollary, the nearby and slightly larger tomb S9 most likely belongs to Sobekhotep IV's predecessor and brother, Neferhotep I. This is perhaps indirectly confirmed by the observation that both Sobekhotep IV and Neferhotep I are known to have been particularly active in Abydos.

== Sources ==
- Ayrton, Edward R.; Weigall, Arthur; Petrie, Flinders (1904). Abydos: Part III: 1904. Egypt exploration fund. Vol. 25. London. OCLC 474028932.
- Dodson, Aidan (2016). The Royal Tombs of Ancient Egypt. Barnsley Pen and Sword Archaeology. ISBN 978-1-47-382159-0.
- McCormack, Dawn (2006). "Borrowed Legacy, Royal Tombs S9 and S10 at South Abydos" (PDF). Expedition. 48 (2). Archived from the original (PDF) on 2016-03-04.
- McCormack, Dawn (2010). "The Significance of Royal Funerary Architecture for the Study of Thirteenth Dynasty Kingship". In Marée, Marcel (ed.). The Second Intermediate Period (Thirteenth-Seventeenth Dynasties), Current Research, Future Prospects (OLA 192). Orientalia Lovaniensia analecta. Vol. 192. Leuven, Paris, Walpole, MA: Peeters. ISBN 978-9-04-292228-0.
- "US diggers identify tomb of Pharoah [sic] Sobekhotep I". Times Live. January 6, 2014.
- "Giant Sarcophagus Leads Penn Museum Team in Egypt To the Tomb of a Previously Unknown Pharaoh". Penn Museum. Archived from the original on July 24, 2018.
- Wegner, Josef W. (2015). "A royal necropolis at south Abydos: New Light on Egypt's Second Intermediate Period". Near Eastern Archaeology. 78 (2): 69–70. doi:10.5615/neareastarch.78.2.0068. S2CID 163519900.
- Wegner, J.; Cahail, K. (2015). "Royal Funerary Equipment of a King Sobekhotep at South Abydos: Evidence for the Tombs of Sobekhotep IV and Neferhotep I?". JARCE. 51: 123–164. doi:10.5913/jarce.51.2015.a006.
