= Senebkay =

Egyptian pharaoh

- Woseribre, Useribre, Seneb Kay
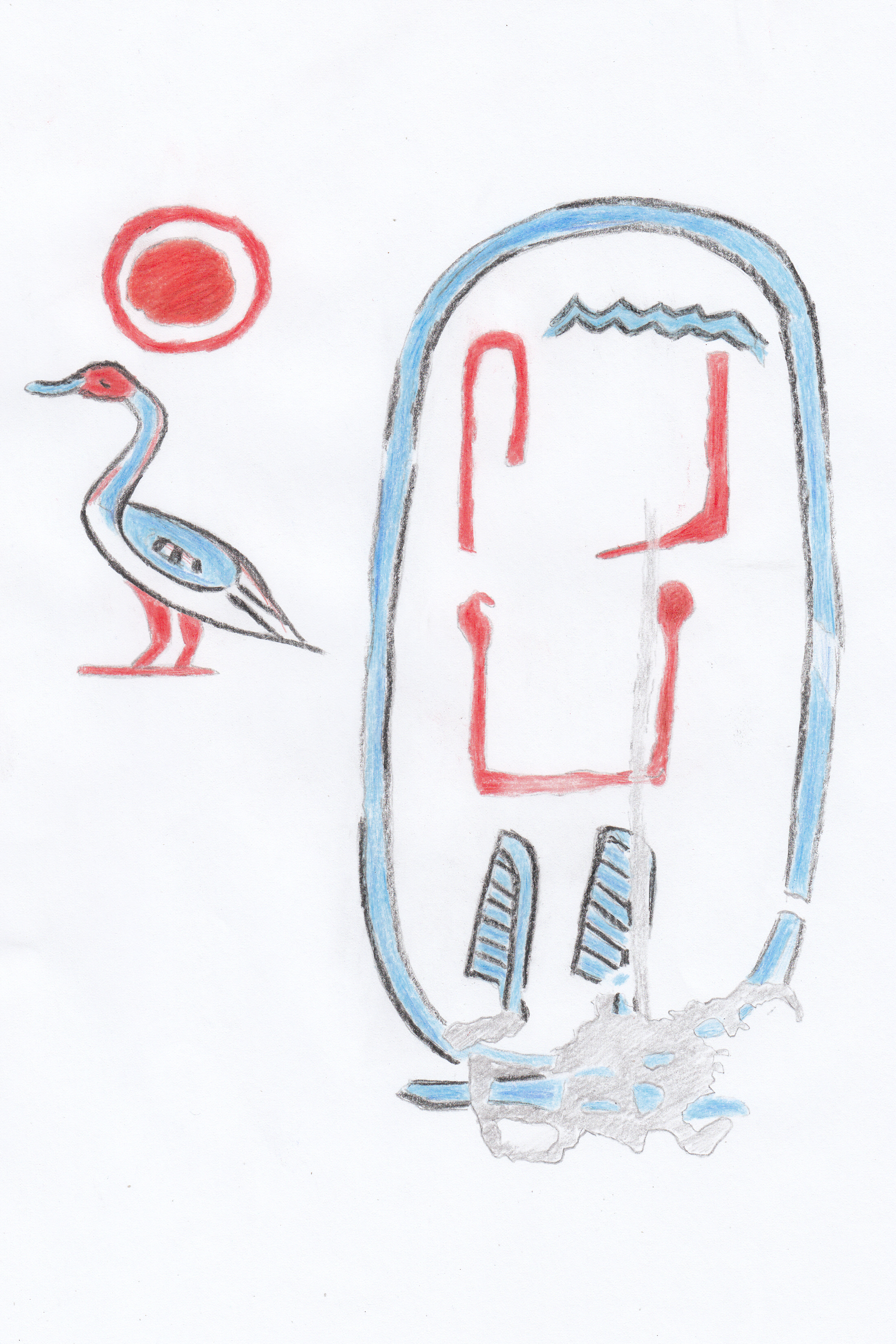
- Drawing of Senebkay's cartouche, from his tomb at Abydos

Pharaoh
- Reign: c. 1650/1600 BC
- Predecessor: ?
- Successor: ?
Royal titulary
Prenomen
Weseribra
wsr-jb-rꜥ
Powerful is the Heart of Re
ra wsr s r ib Z1
Nomen
Senebkai
snb-kꜢj(j)
G39 N5 < s n b D28 i i >
- Born: 17th century BCE
- Died: 17th century BCE (35–40 years old)
- Burial: Abydos, tomb CS9
- Dynasty: uncertain, Abydos Dynasty or 16th Dynasty

Woseribre Senebkay (alternatively Seneb Kay) was an ancient Egyptian king during the Second Intermediate Period. He is thought to have reigned somewhere between 1650 and 1600 BCE. The discovery of his tomb in January 2014 supports the existence of an independent Abydos Dynasty, contemporary with the Fifteenth and Sixteenth Dynasties during the Second Intermediate Period.

== Reign ==
We know nothing about his reign except that he may have had a short reign at Abydos during a period of turmoil following the late 13th Dynasty.

He was violently killed at the age of 35/40, his skeleton showing clear signs of battle. Yet, he was interred in his tomb made from reused/usurped material from the nearby cemetery.

== Burial ==
=== Tomb ===
At Abydos South, the Tomb of Senebkay (CS9) was discovered in 2014 by Josef W. Wegner of the University of Pennsylvania and a team of Egyptian archaeologists.

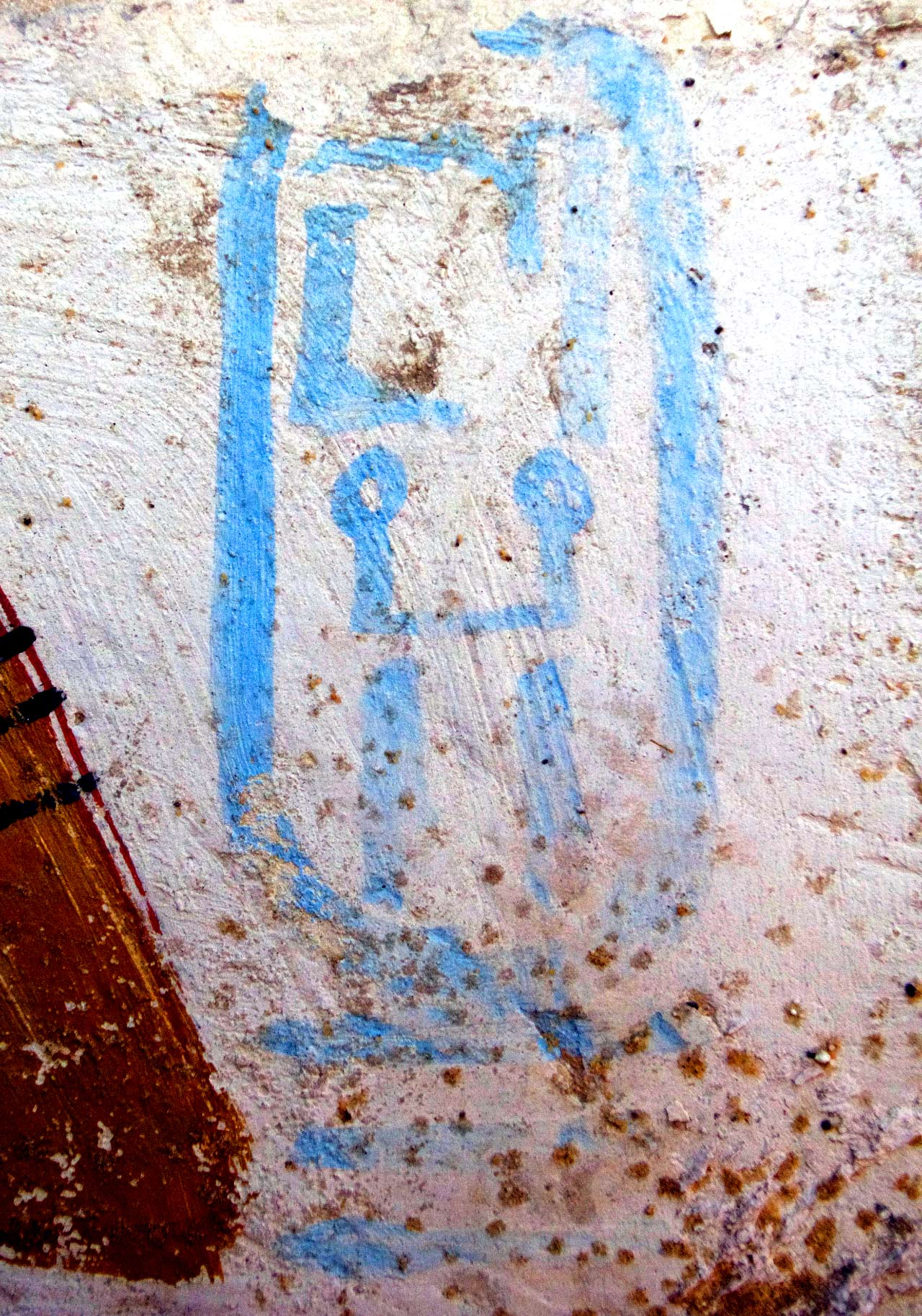
The cartouche of pharaoh Woseribre Senebkay, inside the king's tomb

The four-chamber tomb has a decorated limestone burial chamber. Most blocks of the chamber were reused from older structures, such as the stela of Idudju-iker. On the east, short wall there is a painted depiction of the two Wadjet-eyes. Left and right are standing the goddess Neith and Nut. Over the scene is depicted a winged sun disc. On the North wall is depicted a standing goddess; her name is destroyed. There are short text lines mentioning the deities Duamutef and Qebehsenuf. In the center of the wall appears the cartouche with the king's name Senebkay. The South wall is much destroyed. There are visible the remains of two female deities. Texts mention the deities Amset and Hapi. The texts record the pharaoh's titulary and call him the "king of Upper and Lower Egypt, Woseribre, the son of Re, Senebkay". Senebkay's name was found inscribed inside a royal cartouche.

Senebkay's tomb did not house many funerary goods and may have been robbed in ancient times. Some of the burial equipment, such as the wooden canopic box, were taken from older tombs. The remains of the canopic box were originally part of a coffin that was inscribed for a king Sobekhotep, likely from the nearby tomb S10, now believed to belong to Sobekhotep IV.

=== Death ===
The skeleton of Senebkay shows he was around 5 feet 10 inches (1.78 metres) tall and that he died at the age of 35 to 40 from multiple wounds, most likely sustained in battle. There are eighteen (impact) wounds on his bones of lower back, feet and ankles. The cutting angles suggest he was hit from below, perhaps while he was on a chariot or on horseback. He was killed by several blows to the skull; the curvature of the wounds on the skull indicate the use of battle axes contemporary to the Second Intermediate Period.

The head of the king was once decorated with a mummy mask.

== Attestation ==
His primary attestation is his tomb (CS9) at Abydos. His tomb was made by reusing material from the nearby cemetery.

A further possible object with his name is a magical wand bearing the name Sebkay. The wand was found at Abydos but could refer to one or possibly two kings of the earlier 13th Dynasty. The existence of the so-called Abydos Dynasty was first proposed by Detlef Franke and later further developed by Kim Ryholt in 1997.

=== Non-contemporary attestation ===
The Turin King List 11:16-17, following a summation in 11:14, contains a new sequence of kings partly preserving prenomens of two kings Woser[...]re (wsr-...-r') and Woser[...] (wsr-...). It has been suggested that Woseribre Senebkay may fit here.

== Theories ==
His nomen Senebkay may render as Seneb + Kay, which could be a filiation for Seneb, son of Kay. The name Kay also appear for the early 13th Dynasty ruler Sedjefakare Kay Amenemhat VII.

== See also ==
- List of pharaohs
