= Sedjefakare Kay Amenemhat VII =

Egyptian pharaoh of the 13th Dynasty

- Amenemhat VII, Kay Amenemhat
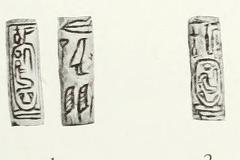
- A pair of cylinder seals of Sedjefakare from the Faiyum region, now in the Petrie Museum

Pharaoh
- Reign: 1 regnal year (attested); 2-3 year (suggested); 1770 to 1765 BC.
- Predecessor: Sebkay
- Successor: Wegaf
Royal titulary
Horus name
Heriteptawy
Ḥrj-tp-t3.w(j)
Leader of the two lands
G5	Hr tp N19
Nebty name
Netjeribaw
Nṯr.j-b3w
Divine of Bas
G16	nTr G30
Golden Horus
Aapehti
ˁ3-phtj
The golden falcon, great of strength
G8 aA F9 F9
Prenomen
Sedjefakare
Sḏf3-k3-Rˁ
The Ka of Ra is flourishing
M23 t L2 t < ra s D f A kA >
Turin King List
Sedjefakare
Sḏf3-k3-Rˁ
The Ka of Ra is flourishing
< ra s D f HASH kA Z1 >
Nomen
Kay Amenemhat
K3jj-Jmn-m-ḥ3.t
Kay Amun is in the front

G39 N5	kA i i i mn n m HAt t
- Dynasty: 13th Dynasty

Sedjefakare Kay Amenemhat VII was an Egyptian pharaoh of the early 13th Dynasty in the late Middle Kingdom.

== Attestations ==
Archaeologically, he is known from several objects, including six cylinder seals, and two scarab seals. His name appears as graffito in the tomb of queen Khuit I at Saqqara.

=== Architecture ===
==== Bark-stand, Cairo JE 15900 ====
At Medamud (Upper Egypt), a bark-stand which originally had an inscription of Sedjefakare to which an inscription was added by Wegaf. In the Turin King List Wegaf (7:05) heads this sequence of kings while Sedjefakare (7:17) comes later in the list, causing a debate about the chronology of these kings.

==== Nile Level Record ====
At Semna (Nubia), a Nile Level Record is dated to Year 1. Other kings with Nile Level records at the fortresses of Semna and Kumma includes Amenemhat III, Amenemhat IV, Sobekneferu, Sekhemkare Amenemhat V and Sekhemre Khutawy Sobekhotep Amenemhat.

=== Cylinder seals ===
Six cylinder seals are known.

==== Cylinder Seal, Petrie UC 11533 ====
At Harageh (Faiyum region), a cylinder seal with the inscription: Sedjefakare, beloved by Sobek lord of Sumenu.

==== Cylinder Seal, Petrie UC 11534 ====
At Lahun (Faiyum region), a cylinder seal with the inscription: Sedjefakare, beloved by Sobek lord of Sumenu.

==== Cylinder Seal, New York MMA 10.130.1640 ====
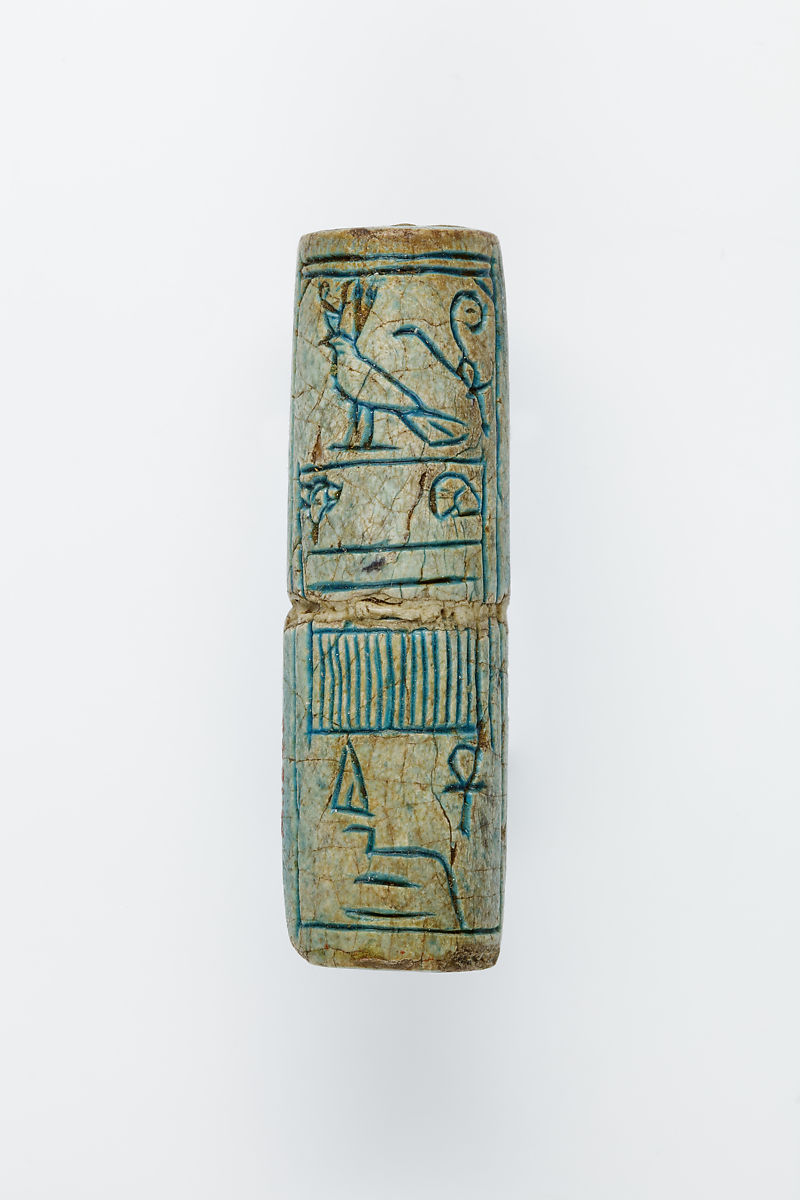
Serekh of Amenemhat VII

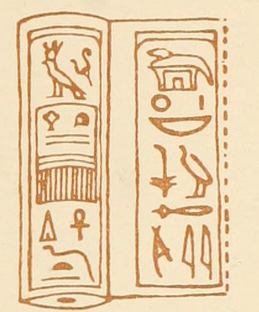
Sealing Sedjefakare

A glaced steatite cylinder seal with the Horus name Horteptawy/Heriteptawy, belonging to Amenemhat VII

=== Scarabs ===
Two scarabs are known.

==== Scarab, New York MMA 26.7.85 ====
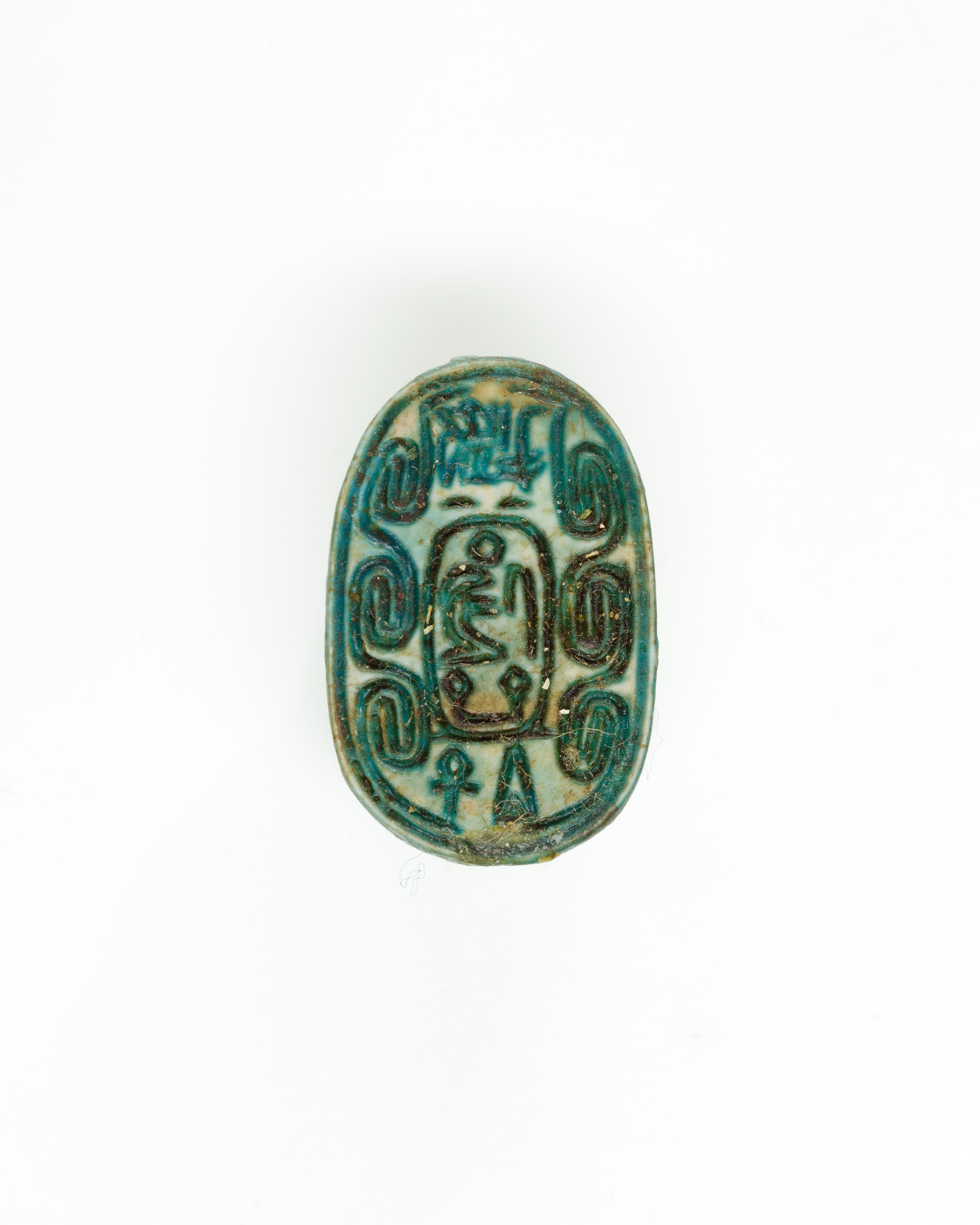
Scarab With Throne Name of Amenemhat VII (Sedjefakare) MET LC-26 7 85 EGDP025848

Scarab With Throne Name Sedjefakare, belonging to Amenemhat VII.

== Non-Contemporary Attestations ==
The Turin King List 7:18 contains the entry: "The Dual King Sedjefa..kara, x years ...". In the list he is predeceded by 7:17 Awtibra Hor and succeeded by 7:19 Sekhemre Khutawy Sobekhotep Amenemhat.

== Burial ==
The Tomb of Sedjefakare has not been located.

== Theories ==
Ryholt assigns him without further evidence a reign of 3 years. He suggests a dating around 1769-1766 BC.

== Bibliography ==
- K.S.B. Ryholt, The Political Situation in Egypt during the Second Intermediate Period (Carsten Niebuhr Institute Publications, vol. 20. Copenhagen: Museum Tusculanum Press, 1997), 341, File 13/20.

== See also ==
- List of Pharaohs

Preceded by Sebkay	Pharaoh of Egypt; Thirteenth Dynasty	Succeeded by Wegaf
