= Coptic period =

Period of Ancient Egypt between the 3rd and 7th centuries

The "Coptic period" is an informal designation for Late Roman Egypt (3rd−4th centuries) and Byzantine Egypt (4th−7th centuries). This era was defined by the religious shifts in Egyptian culture to Coptic Christianity from ancient Egyptian religion, until the Muslim conquest of Egypt in the 7th century.

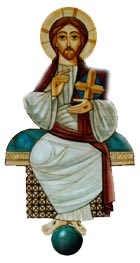
Jesus Christ in a Coptic icon.

The period began in about the 3rd century and, depending on sources and usage, lasted until around the noticeable decline of Christianity in Egypt in the 9th century, or to the arrival of Islam in the 7th century.

Although the term "Coptic period" is utilized in popular discourse, its use in academia is generally avoided due to its imprecise nature, whereas "Late Antiquity" or "Byzantine Egypt" can be defined on chronological grounds.

== Relation with Pharaonic Egypt ==
Coptic Christian writers during this period sought to discredit some perceived pagan practices as evil or satanic, and worked to recast those they could in a more positive, Christian light. An example of this is the continued use of ritual mummification in certain monastic contexts. For example, this continued at the monastery complex of Deir el-Bachit in Thebes. While not entirely similar to pagan mummification rituals, the techniques showed a resemblance to those of earlier periods, without most of the lavishness of Pharaonic times.

It is important to point out however, that said practices were only tolerated to a point. For example, when peasants began keeping mummies of martyred Copts in their houses, Athanasius of Alexandria chastised them for not acting as good Christians should.

Another aspect of cultural links to earlier periods in Egyptian history can be seen through Coptic art. The Coptic period is characterised by the melting together of older Pharaonic and Greco-Roman styles with contemporary Christian ones. This artistic style reflects the multicultural nature of Egypt at the time. This phenomenon, the combination of old and new practices, can also be seen in Coptic music which uses the same melodies as earlier Egyptian music did but with the words changed to have a Christian meaning.

Cultural carryover like this, most likely was used as a way to gain new converts and make Christian doctrine more palatable to Egyptians.

== Relations with the Chalcedonian Christian Church ==
The Coptic Church in Egypt, known as the Church of Alexandria during this period, suffered from persecution and suppression from both the temporal authority of the Eastern Roman Emperors as well as the Chalcedonian Church, which had become the predominant Christian church in the Empire following the Council of Chalcedon of 451 AD. The worst of these persecutions came during the early 600s under Emperor Phocas, leading a number of Copts to side with the Persians, whom the Eastern Roman Empire was at war with at the time.

Despite these hardships, the Coptic Church not only survived but thrived throughout Egypt, even boasting an ecclesiastical hierarchy and administration equal in size and influence to the mainstream Chalcedonian Church and maintaining strong links with neighboring regions like Syria.

The situation would improve for the Copts with the Muslim conquest of Egypt. Wanting to seem impartial, the Muslim governors did not favor one church over another and tried to mediate their theological disagreements. This situation favored the Copts, as they no longer had to fear state persecution and could expand their reach more than ever before, with bishops of the Coptic church even returning to cities such as Cairo and Alexandria from where they had been expelled by the Eastern Roman authorities and church.
