= Sekhemre Wahkhau Rahotep =

Egyptian pharaoh

- Rehotep, Rahotpe, Rehotpe, Sekhem-uah-kha-ra, Sekhemre Wa-ka'u
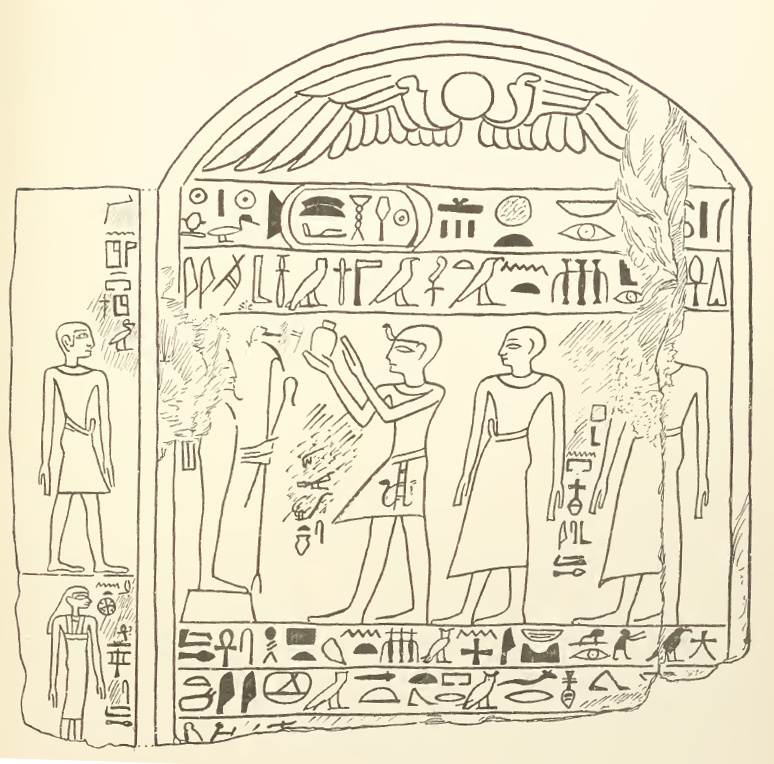
- Rahotep (raising arms) while offering to Osiris. Stele BM EA 833, drawn by Wallis Budge.

Pharaoh
- Reign: 1580 BC – 1576 BC
- Successor: Sobekemsaf I or Nebmaatre
Royal titulary
Horus name
Wah-Ankh
ˁnḫ-w3ḥ
Enduring of life
G5	V29 S34
Nebty name
User-Renput
Wsr-rnpwt
Powerful in years
G16	wsr s r D36 M4 M4 M4
Golden Horus
Wadj[...]
bik-nbw-w3ḏ-[...]
The Golden Falcon who regains strength [...]
G8 M14 HASH
Prenomen
Sekhemre-Wahkhau
sḫm-rˁ w3ḥ-ḫaw
Mighty is Re, enduring of apparitions < N5 S42 V29 N28 Z2 >
Karnak king list:
[Sekhem]rewahkhau
[Sḫm]-Rˁ-w3ḥ-ḫˁw
[Mighty is] Re, enduring of apparitions
< N5 HASH V29 N28 Z2 >
Nomen
Rahotep
Rˁ ḥtp
Ra is satisfied

G39 N5	r D36 N5 Z1 R4 t p
- Dynasty: 17th Dynasty

Sekhemre Wahkhau Rahotep was an Egyptian pharaoh who reigned during the Second Intermediate Period, when Egypt was ruled by multiple kings. The Egyptologists Kim Ryholt and Darrell Baker believe that Rahotep was the first king of the 17th Dynasty.

== Attestations ==
Rahotep seem to be attested at Abydos and Coptos.

=== Abydos ===
==== BM EA 833 ====
A limestone stele which shows Rahotep making an offering to Osiris for two deceased, an officer and a priest. The stela appears to have been made at a workshop at Abydos. Other stelae produced by this workshop belong to king Sekhemrekhutawy Pantjeny and king Wepwawetemsaf. All three kings reigned therefore quite close in time.

=== Coptos ===
==== Petrie Museum UC 14327 ====
Rahotep is known from a stele found at Coptos reporting the restoration of the temple of Min. The stele reads:

(year ... under) the Majesty of Horus Wahankh, Two Ladies Weserrenput, Horus of Gold, Wad ... (... Son of) Re Rahotep, given life. His Majesty (said?) to his nobles and the courtiers who were in his following ... the temple ... My Majesty found (concerning) my father (Min), who is at the head of all gods, that his gates and doors had fallen into ruin, (They did obeisance ? before) his Majesty and said: What your ka (commands) shall come to pass, O king, our lord. It is Hu, indeed, who is in your mouth, and Sia (who is in your heart). Ptah-Sokar ... the gods fashioned you ... that you might act for them to found their temples ... You have united Upper and Lower Egypt. May your heart be joyful upon the Horus-throne of the living ... You are ruling what the sun (encircles) ... the god (...) of the people, the refuge of all...night ... in sleeping ... the gods in seeking what is beneficial to this land. Re has placed you as his image ... what is removed (?)... as it was in the time of your fathers, the kings who followed Horus. Never was ... lost in my time ... which existed formerly. I made monuments for the gods ... wonders, which were brought ...

==== Bow of King's Son Ameny ====
Rahotep is mentioned on a bow of a king's son Ameny dedicated to "the service of Min in all his feasts" at Coptos.

=== Non-Contemporary Attestations ===
==== Karnak King List ====
In the Thutmosid Period, he is mentioned in the Karnak King List #48 as "[Sekhem]re Wahkhau" {[sḫm]-rꜤ wꜢḥ-ḫꜤw}, between Khaankhre Sobekhotep and Sewahenre Senebmiu.

==== Turin King List ====
In the Ramesside Period, he is not mentioned in the Turin King List.

==== Konsuemheb and the Ghost ====
In the late New Kingdom tale Khonsuemheb and the Ghost, the protagonist encounters a ghost who claims to have been in life "Overseer of the treasuries of king Rahotep". However, the ghost also claims to have died in regnal Year 14 of a later king Mentuhotep. These statements seem to contradict each other since none of Rahotep's successors named Mentuhotep are known to have reigned for so long, thus making the identification of both these kings problematic.

== Theories ==
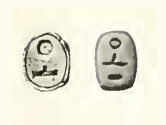
Two scarabs bearing the inscription "Rahotep", believed by Flinders Petrie to be referring to this king.

While Ryholt and Baker propose that Rahotep was the first king of the 17th Dynasty, Jürgen von Beckerath sees him as the second king of that dynasty. Alternatively, Claude Vandersleyen has tentatively dated Rahotep to the 13th Dynasty on the grounds that he believes Rahotep to be related to Sobekemsaf I, which Vandersleyen also dates to the 13th Dynasty because of the quality and number of statues attributable to him. Baker deems these arguments "slim and rejected by most scholars".

If he was indeed a ruler of the early 17th Dynasty, Rahotep would have controlled Upper Egypt as far north as Abydos. According to Ryholt's reconstruction of the Second Intermediate Period, Rahotep's reign would have taken place shortly after the collapse of the 16th Dynasty with the conquest of Thebes by the Hyksos and their subsequent withdrawal from the region. In the wake of the conflict, the Hyksos would have looted and destroyed temples and palaces. Rahotep consequently "boasts of restorations [he performed] in temples at Abydos and Coptos". In Abydos, he had the enclosure walls of the temple of Osiris renewed and in Coptos he restored the temple of Min of which "gates and doors [have] fallen into ruins". This chronology of events is debated and some scholars contest that Thebes was ever conquered by the Hyksos. Rather, they believe the kings of Upper Egypt could have been vassals of the Hyksos.

Unknown	Pharaoh of Egypt; Seventeenth Dynasty	Succeeded by Sobekemsaf I
