= Josef W. Wegner =

American Egyptologist, archaeologist and professor

Josef William Wegner
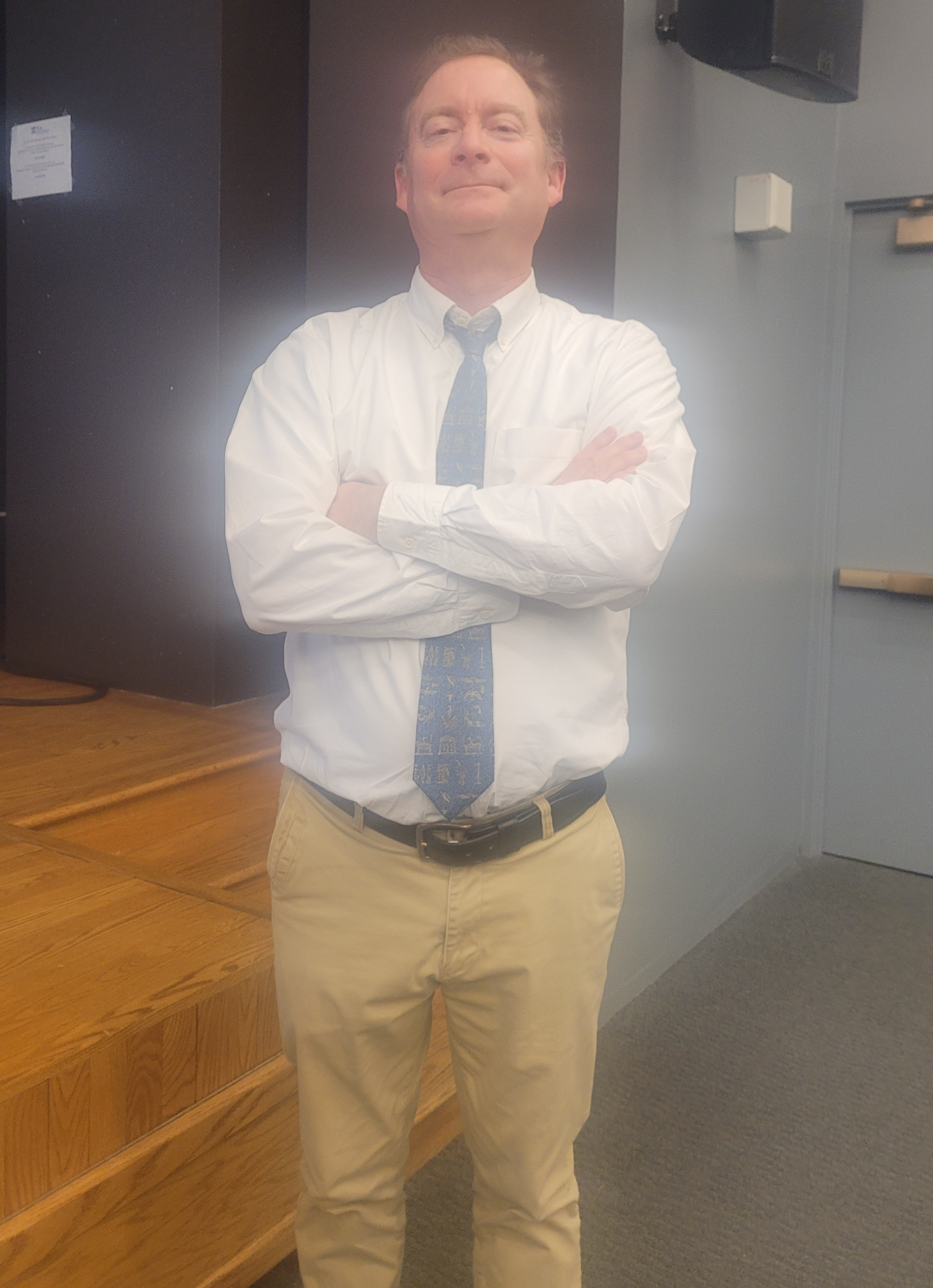
- At the Penn Museum, February 2026
- Education: University of Pennsylvania
- Occupation: Professor of Egyptian Archaeology at the University of Pennsylvania

Josef William Wegner (born October 1967) is an American Egyptologist, archaeologist and Professor in Egyptology at the department of Near Eastern Languages and Civilizations of the University of Pennsylvania, where he obtained his Ph.D. degree in Egyptology in 1996. He specializes in Egyptian Middle Kingdom archaeology (circa 2050-1650BCE). His father is the astrophysicist, Gary A. Wegner.

He is noted for his continued research at Abydos, where he excavated the tomb of pharaoh Sobekhotep IV in 2013 and discovered that of Pharaoh Seneb Kay in 2014. Later, he excavated an entire royal necropolis dating to the Second Intermediate Period, possibly belonging to kings of the Theban sixteenth dynasty or witnessing the existence of the Abydos dynasty. Wegner published an analysis of the Sunshade Chapel of Meritaten from the House-of-Waenre of Akhenaten in a university museum monograph that was abstracted in 2018. His research has been funded by "the American Research Center in Egypt, the National Science Foundation, the National Endowment for the Humanities, the National Geographic Society, [and the] American Philosophical Society."

== Career ==
Wegner was raised in New Hampshire, but he regularly traveled to the nearby Penn Museum to admire its expansive Egyptian collections as a child. He attended the University of Pennsylvania as an undergraduate student, graduating with a double major in Anthropology and Egyptology in 1989. He returned to Penn for his graduate degree, completing his Ph.D. in 1996 with a dissertation on the formation of the Osiris cult in Abydos region during the Middle Kingdom (circa 2000-1600 BCE). His excavation project in South Abydos was the first significant project in the region in nearly a century. In 2002, Wegner was appointed Associate Curator in the Egyptian division at the Penn Museum. He is currently a Professor of Egyptian Archaeology at the University of Pennsylvania's Near Eastern Languages and Civilizations department and Curator at the Penn Museum. His recent fieldwork has focused on topics such as Pharaoh Senwosret III's burial site and cult settlement in South Abydos, including a 2021 paper published by the Journal of the American Research Center in Egypt entitled, "A Late Middle Kingdom Temple Bakery at South Abydos."

== Selected works ==
- The mortuary complex of Senwosret III : a study of Middle Kingdom state activity and the cult of Osiris at Abydos Ph.D. thesis, (1996) OCLC 857223788
- Searching for Ancient Egypt (author David P. Silverman), contributor (1997) ISBN 1-931707-36-7
- Akhenaten and Tutankhamun : Revolution and Restoration, coauthor (2006) ISBN 978-1-93-170790-9
- The Mortuary Temple of Senwosret III at Abydos (2007) ISBN 0-9740025-4-2
- Archaism and Innovation, coauthor (2009) ISBN 0-9802065-1-0
- The Sphinx That Traveled to Philadelphia : The Story of the Colossal Sphinx of Ramses the Great in the Penn Museum, coauthor (2015) ISBN 978-1-93-453677-3
- The Sunshade Chapel of Meritaten from the House-of-Waenre of Akhenaten : Penn Museum E16230, (2017) ISBN 978-1-93-453687-2
- King Seneb-Kay's Tomb and the Necropolis of a Lost Dynasty at Abydos, coauthor (2021) ISBN 978-1-94-905710-2
