= Dorothy Eady =

British Egyptologist

- Born: Dorothy Louise Eady; 16 January 1904; Blackheath, London, England
- Died: 21 April 1981 (aged 77); El Araba El Madfuna, Egypt
- Other name: Omm Sety
- Occupations: Author / draughtswoman, antiquities caretaker, folklorist
- Known for: Early practitioner of Kemetism, association with Egyptology, author on Egyptian folklore
- Spouse: Emam Abdel Meguid (married 1931/1933, separated 1935)
- Children: Sety Meguid

Dorothy Louise Eady (16 January 1904 – 21 April 1981), also known as Omm Sety or Om Seti (Arabic: أم سيتي), was a British antiques caretaker and folklorist. She was keeper of the Abydos Temple of Seti I and draughtswoman for the Department of Egyptian Antiquities. She is known for her belief that in a previous life she had been a priestess in ancient Egypt, as well as her considerable historical research at Abydos. Her life and work have been the subject of many articles, television documentaries, and biographies.

== Early life ==
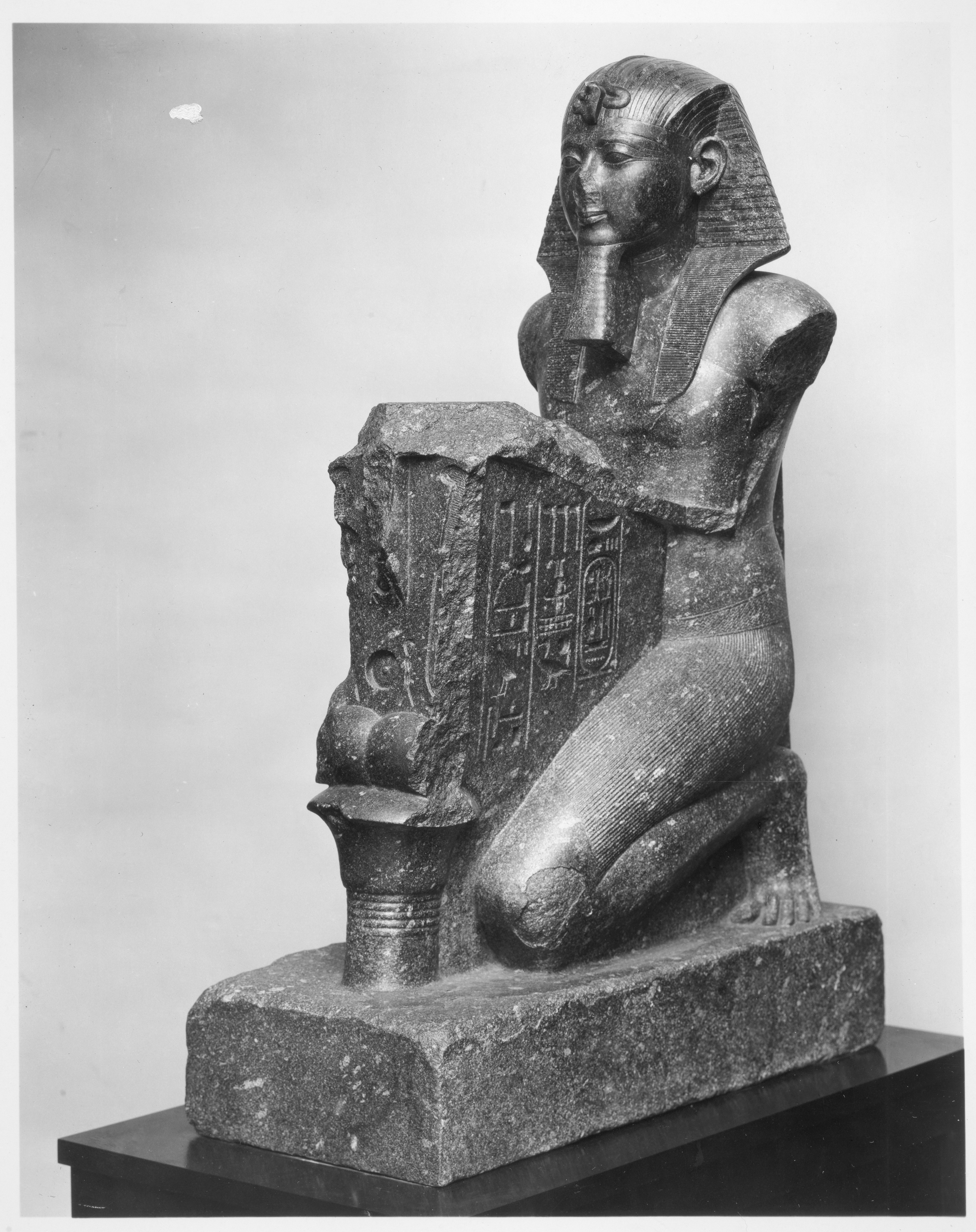
Seti I making an offering to Osiris

Louise Eady was born in London in 1904 as the only child to Reuben Ernest Eady, a master tailor born in Woolwich, and Caroline Mary (Frost) Eady, and raised in a coastal town.

At the age of three, after falling down a flight of stairs and briefly appearing to be dead, she began exhibiting strange behaviours, asking that she be "brought home".

She had also developed foreign accent syndrome. This caused some conflict in her early life. Her Sunday school teacher requested that her parents keep her away from class, because she had compared Christianity with "heathen" ancient Egyptian religion.

She was expelled from a Dulwich girls school after she refused to sing a hymn that called on God to "curse the swart Egyptians". Her regular visits to a Roman Catholic church to hear the Catholic Mass, which she liked because it reminded her of the "Old Religion", were terminated after a visit to her parents and an interrogation by a Roman Catholic priest.

After being taken by her parents to visit the British Museum, and on observing a photograph in the New Kingdom temple exhibits room, the young Eady called out "There is my home!" but "where are the trees? Where are the gardens?" The temple was that of Seti I, the father of Rameses the Great.

She ran about the halls of the Egyptian rooms, "amongst her peoples", kissing the statues' feet.

After this trip, she took every opportunity to visit the British Museum rooms. There, she eventually met E. A. Wallis Budge, who was taken by her youthful enthusiasm and encouraged her in the study of hieroglyphs. (Note: It was Omm Sety's belief that Wallis Budge adopted the Ancient Egyptian religion but he discouraged her from using heka, commonly translated into English as magic.)

After a close escape from a bombing raid during World War I, she moved to her grandmother's house in Sussex. Here, she continued her study of ancient Egypt at the Eastbourne public library. When she was fifteen, she described a nocturnal visit from the mummy of Pharaoh Seti I. (Note: The mummy of Seti I (the form in which Eady reported he first appeared to her) was discovered in 1881 as part of the Deir el Bahri cache and exhibited in Room 52 of the Cairo Museum. Anwar Sadat had the room closed to the public, as he considered it a desecration that the Royal mummies should be objects of casual curiosity. It has since been reopened.)

Her behaviour, coupled with sleep walking and nightmares, led her to be incarcerated in sanatoriums several times.

On leaving school at sixteen, she visited museums and archaeological sites around Britain, facilitated by her father's investigations into the nationwide booming cinema industry.

Eady became a part-time student at Plymouth Art School and began to collect affordable Egyptian antiquities. During her period at Portsmouth, she became part of a theatre group that on occasion performed a play based on the story of Isis and Osiris. She took the role of Isis and sang the lamentation for Osiris's death, based on Andrew Lang's translation:

Sing we Osiris dead, lament the fallen head;
The light has left the world, the world is grey.
Athwart the starry skies the web of darkness lies;
Sing we Osiris, passed away.
Ye tears, ye stars, ye fires, ye rivers shed;
Weep, children of the Nile, weep — for your Lord is dead.

At the age of twenty-seven, she began working in London with an Egyptian public relations magazine, for which she wrote articles and drew cartoons that reflected her political support for an independent Egypt. During this period she met her future husband Emam Abdel Meguid, an Egyptian student, with whom she continued to correspond when he returned home.

== Move to Egypt ==
In 1931, she moved to Egypt after Emam Abdel Meguid, by now a teacher of English, asked her to marry him. On arriving in Egypt, she kissed the ground and announced she had come home to stay.

The couple stayed in Cairo and her husband's family gave her the nickname 'Bulbul' ('nightingale'). Their son was named Sety, from which is derived her popular name Omm Sety ('Mother of Sety'). After a chance meeting with George Reisner's secretary, who commented on her apparent ability to charm snakes and told her that spells on such powers were in early ancient Egyptian literature, Eady visited the Fifth Dynasty pyramid of Unas.

Klaus Baer recalled her piety when she accompanied him on a visit to Saqqara in the early 1950s, when she brought an offering and took off her shoes before entering Unas' pyramid.

She continued to report apparitions and out-of-body experiences during this time, which caused friction with the upper-middle-class family she had married into.

=== Nighttime visions of Hor-Ra ===
During her early period, Eady reported nighttime visitations by an entity called Hor-Ra who she claimed was the spirit of Seti I. Eady stated that Hor-Ra slowly dictated to her, over a twelve-month period, the story of her previous life.

The story, written by Eady, took up around seventy pages of cursive hieroglyphic text. It described the life of a young woman in ancient Egypt, called Bentreshyt, who had reincarnated in the person of Dorothy Eady. (Note: Omm Sety described the Demotic text as looking "to me like nothing I could appreciate – as if a beautiful hieroglyph text had been run over by a lorry and totally distorted out of shape" (El Zeini, p. 72–75 for part transcript). She had not studied Demotic and it was only whilst in a trance like state she was able to struggle in putting down what she reported as Hor-Ra's dictation. She showed the text to Jaraslov Cerny a few years later who thought her writing was good for a beginner and that he could obtain employment for her if she continued to be enthusiastic about the subject.) Bentreshyt (meaning 'Harp of Joy') is described in this text as being of humble origin, her mother a vegetable seller and her father a soldier during the reign of Seti I (c. 1290 BC to 1279 BC).

When she was three, her mother died, and she was placed in the temple of Kom el-Sultan because her father could not afford her. There, she was brought up to be a priestess.

When she was twelve years old, the High Priest asked her if she wished to go out into the world or stay and become a consecrated virgin. In the absence of full understanding and without a practical alternative, she took the vows.

During the next two years, she learned her role in the annual drama of Osiris's passion and resurrection, a role that only virgin priestesses consecrated to Isis could perform. One day, Seti I visited and spoke to her. They became lovers, eating "the uncooked goose", an ancient Egyptian term that has been compared to "eating the forbidden fruit".

When Bentreshyt became pregnant, she told the High Priest who the father was. The High Priest informed her that the gravity of the offence against Isis was so terrible that death would be the most likely penalty at a trial. Unwilling to face the public scandal for Seti, she took her own life rather than face trial.

== Work with Selim Hassan and Ahmed Fakhry ==
In 1935, Eady separated from her husband when he took a teaching job in Iraq. Their son Sety stayed with her.

Two years after the marriage broke down, she went to live in Nazlat al-Samman near the Giza pyramids, where she met the Egyptian archaeologist Selim Hassan of the Department of Antiquities, who employed her as his secretary and draughtswoman. She was the department's first female employee and a boon to Hassan.

According to Barbara Lesko, "She was a great help to Egyptian scholars, especially Hassan and Fakhry, correcting their English and writing English-language articles for others. So this poorly educated Englishwoman developed in Egypt into a first-rate draughtswoman and prolific and talented writer who, even under her own name, produced articles, essays, monographs and books of great range, wit and substance."

Through her keen interest in antiquities, she met and befriended many of the famous Egyptologists of the era. Eady made such a significant contribution to Hassan's work that upon his death she was employed by Ahmed Fakhry during his excavations at Dashur.

Hassan's magnum opus, the ten-volume "Excavations at Giza", gives "special mention, with sincere gratitude" to Eady for her editing, drawing, indexing, and proofreading work. She learned from these scholars the techniques of archaeology, whilst they benefited from her expertise in hieroglyphs and drawing.

During this time she prayed, made frequent offerings to the gods of ancient Egypt, and would often spend the night in the Great Pyramid.

Eady became the object of village gossip because she would make night prayers and offerings to Horus at the Great Sphinx. Yet she also was respected by the villagers for her honesty in not hiding her true faith in the Egyptian gods.

She was sensitive to the religious observances of others, and would fast with the Muslim villagers during Ramadan and celebrate with Christians at Christmas.

Her associations with the workers and their families gave her first-hand experience of contemporary Egyptian life. She saw a common thread joining all periods of Egyptian history; the Pharaonic, the Greco-Roman, the Christian, and the Islamic. This thread was the Nile, which animated people's lives on many levels.

== Move to Abydos ==
Ahmed Fakhry's Dashur Pyramid Research Project was terminated in early 1956, leaving Eady unemployed. Fakhry suggested that she "climb the Great Pyramid; and when you reach the top, just turn west, address yourself to your Lord Osiris and ask him "Quo vadis?" (which means "Where are you going?" in Latin). He offered her a choice of taking a well paid job in the Cairo Records Office, or a poorly paid position in Abydos as a draughtswoman. She chose the latter. She reported that Seti I approved of the move. He claimed that the "wheel of fate" was turning and this would be a time of testing; if she was chaste, she would undo the ancient sin of Bentreshyt dictated to her by Hor-Ra.

On 3 March 1956, the fifty-two-year-old Eady left for Abydos. She set up home in Arabet Abydos, which sits in the cradle of the mountain Pega-the-Gap. The ancient Egyptians believed this mountain led to Amenti and the afterlife. It was here that she began to be called 'Omm Sety', because it was customary in Egyptian villages to refer to a mother by the name of her eldest child.

Abydos had a special significance for her, because it is where she believed Bentreshyt had lived and served in the Temple of Seti. She had made two brief pilgrimages to the site in the early 1950s.

According to her own recall, at one of these trips to the temple, the chief inspector from the Antiquities Department, who knew about her claims, had decided to test her by asking her to stand at particular wall paintings in complete darkness. She completed the task successfully, even though the painting locations had not yet been published at this time.

She spent the first two years listing and translating pieces from a recently excavated temple palace. Her work was incorporated into Edouard Ghazouli's monograph "The Palace and Magazines Attached to the Temple of Seti I at Abydos". He expressed particular thanks to her in this work and was impressed by the skills she showed in translation of enigmatic texts, along with other members of the Antiquities Department. In 1957, she wrote out a liturgical calendar of feast days based on ancient Egyptian texts.

For her, the Temple of Seti was a place of peace and security where she was watched over by the benevolent eyes of ancient Egyptian gods. She claimed that in her past life as Bentreshyt the temple had a garden, where she had first met Seti I. Her descriptions as a young girl were not believed by her parents, but while she was living in Abydos, the garden was found where she said it would be found at the southwest of the temple. Excavations uncovered a garden which matched her descriptions.

Every morning and night she would visit the Temple to recite the prayers for the day. On the birthdays of Osiris and Isis she would observe the ancient food abstentions, and bring offerings of beer, wine, bread, and tea biscuits to the Chapel of Osiris. The Lament of Isis and Osiris, which she learned as a girl, would also be recited. She turned one of the temple rooms into a personal office, where she carried out her work and befriended a cobra whom she fed on a regular basis, to the alarm of the temple guards.

She described the Temple of Seti as like entering a time machine, where the past becomes the present and the modern mind has difficulty understanding a world in which magic is accepted. She claimed that the scenes depicted on the temple walls were active in the minds of ancient Egyptians on two levels. Firstly, they made the actions displayed permanent. The painting of Pharaoh offering bread to Osiris, for example, continued his actions so long as the depiction remained. Secondly, the image could be animated by the spirit of the god, if the person stood before the depiction and called on the god's name.

== Omm Sety's observations of surviving folkways ==
Omm Sety observed that, although modern village women could have free birth control, they did not want it. "If they miss one year without having a child, they go running around all over the place – even to the doctor! And if that doesn't work, they will try all sorts of other things." These included approaching a temple image of Isis at Abydos ("the Good Lady"), Hathor at Dendera, a statue of Senwosret III south of Abydos, a statue of Taweret in the Cairo museum and the pyramids at Giza. (Note: Omm Sety on observing the damage done to the phallus of Min in the Temple of Seti at Abydos, by people scraping particles from it to drink as a cure for impotency, exclaimed "That idiot of a sculptor! If he had any foresight he would have made the phallus of Min a hundred yards long!")

She also reported how people would come to her looking for a cure for impotence. For these people she would carry out a ritual based on the Pyramid Texts. It always worked. The use of Heka without Maat was contrary to the "will of the gods", so she concentrated on healing people or ridding them of the "effects of evil spells". According to an acquaintance, "Omm Sety wouldn't do any harm to anybody unless he or she did harm to her."

She said that unusual baby feeding methods used in modern times in Egypt, such as breast milk being supplied via bowl, echoed similar scenes from Pharaonic times. The sidelock of youth which ancient Egyptian children wore survived with some modern Egyptian peasant children, who were left with a tuft of hair after the rest is shaved off during their first haircut. Ancient Egyptian boys were circumcised, probably for reasons of hygiene, and she believed this was picked up by the Jews, which in turn was passed down to modern Muslims. Many modern children's games and toys were also played by children in ancient Egypt.

Omm Sety observed that the Tree of Extremity, mentioned in the Quran with inscribed leaves, compares with ancient Egyptian Temple scenes in which a god is shown inscribing the royal cartouche on leaves adorning The Tree of Life.

Uniquely for a Muslim land, Omm Sety noted that modern Egyptian villages had a custom of highly visible form of mourning. She attributed this to Egypt's ancient heritage. Such customs were first recorded in the Pyramid Texts during the third millennium BCE. She compared other modern rituals of death with ancient practices, e.g., keeping watch with the dead (even though it is at variance with official Islamic teaching), perfuming the dead, boats in tombs, lights for the dead, the modern peasant practice of placing bread on the bier of the dead, and washing the clothes of the dead. Omm Sety observed that in Lower modern Egypt, "old fashioned people" believed that the stars in the night sky represented the dead, and notes how in the Pyramid Texts, the Royal deceased were also thought to be stars. The practice in Omm Seti's time of not cutting hair or shaving as a sign of mourning is also echoed in ancient Egypt.

Though it does not form part of official Islamic teaching, she noted the widespread belief amongst modern Egyptians, educated and uneducated, that each human had a qarina, a spiritual component which is separate from the soul, and she compared this with the ancient Egyptian belief in a person's Ka. Ancient Egyptians believed that the shadow of a person was an intrinsic part of human make-up, and Omm Sety noted that the peasants of modern Egypt held similar beliefs and treated the shadow with caution.

She compared the modern Egyptian belief in Afrits (demonic beings who appear upside-down) with the demonic upside-down beings who appear in the Pyramid Texts. Ancient Egyptians believed in Heka, "magic," and used protective amulets with spells written on them. She compared this with modern practices, performed by poor sellers in market squares, in which verses of the Koran are inscribed on, or tucked into, amulets.

Both ancient and modern Egyptians commonly believed in spiritual possession and practised techniques for freeing the victim. Examples survive from ancient times showing how a statue of a god, propitiated with offerings, brought the release of a possessed person. In modern times the person who presides over such a ritual is called a shaykh and, similar to ancient practices, offerings are made to the spirit which has taken up residence in the person. An alternative way is a ceremony called the butadjiyya, in which words are recited from the Quran with the patient immersed in the smoke of incense. A Christian method involves a pilgrimage to a Coptic Church at Mit Damsis. After ten days without washing it is hoped that St. George will appear and pierce the patient's foot from which the demon will depart.

Omm Sety believed in the curative powers of water from certain holy places. She would heal herself by jumping into the sacred pool in the Osireion fully clothed. Friends report how she not only healed herself but others using this method. A baby brought to her by distraught parents because of breathing difficulties recovered after using water from the Osireion. Omm Sety reported that she no longer needed glasses, was cured of arthritis and appendicitis using the waters of the Osireion.

Along with Kent Weeks, she was interested in and very knowledgeable on the subject of folk medicine. He notes that treatments used today can be traced back through ancient Egyptian texts which associate the particular trees used with goddesses such as Hathor and Isis. Omm Seti recorded that long after the conversion of Egypt to Islam, the power of the "old gods" was still recognised. Al-Maqrizi recorded that after a fanatical shaykh disfigured the face of the Sphinx the cultivated land around Giza was invaded and covered with sand. Unlike the gods associated with fertility, she noted the fear inspired in some modern Egyptians by a statue of the goddess Sekhmet even though they were unaware of the Ancient Egyptian accounts associating her with the destruction of mankind.

A common belief amongst village people relates to a "bogeyman" and "terrorist," called Ba Bah, and compares with the obscure ancient Egyptian god Bwbi who similarly invoked terror. Villagers from the town of Arabet Abydos reported occasionally seeing a "large golden boat" floating upon a one-time lake. Omm Sety noted that the villagers were ignorant of the ancient Egyptian mystery play, once enacted at Abydos, involving a Neshmet boat. The villagers, obliviously, observed the apparition where there had once been a sacred lake.

Popular customs associated with Easter, observed by both Copts and Muslims, were considered by her to probably originate in ancient Egypt. On "Job Wednesday," during the week preceding Easter Sunday, a bath is taken and the body scrubbed with a plant, "Egyptian Amaranath", called ghabira by the Muslims, and damissa by the Copts. They believe that Job of the Bible was cured from his leprosy by similar means. In the absence of any scriptural authority for this event, she speculates that it is based on the Pyramid texts in which the same plant is used by the King to purify himself.

Between December and January (the month of Koiak in both ancient Egyptian and Coptic calendars), Muslims and Copts, but mainly the latter, sow small gardens which are thought to bring prosperity to the household when they sprout. Omm Sety believed that this originates with the ancient Egyptian practice of sowing "Osiris Gardens" and "Osiris Beds" during the month of Kiahk. The sprouting vegetation symbolised resurrection. Andrew Strum notes a similar practice amongst Egyptian Jews, in this case relating to atonement for sin, and also speculates that this has its origins in the Osirian beliefs of ancient Egypt.

Omm Sety detailed many other modern practices transmitted down from ancient times in short articles written between 1969 and 1975. These were edited and published by the Egyptologist Nicole B. Hansen in 2008, under the title "Omm Sety's Living Egypt: Surviving Folkways from Pharaonic Times," with a foreword by Kent Weeks and an introduction by Walter A. Fairservis.

== Later years ==
On reaching the age of sixty in 1964, Omm Sety was faced with mandatory retirement by the Antiquities Department and advised to seek part-time work in Cairo. She went to Cairo, but only stayed one day before returning to Abydos. The Antiquities Department decided to make an exception to their retirement age rules and allowed her to continue her work at Abydos for a further five years, until she retired in 1969. Her pension of $30 per month was supplemented by needlework sold to friends and tourists, who also brought gifts of clothes, food, and reading materials.

She began work as a part-time consultant for the Antiquities Department, guiding tourists around the Temple of Seti and explaining the symbolism of the painted wall scenes. In 1972, she suffered a mild heart attack and in the aftermath decided to sell her old house and move into a zareba (a ramshackle single room made of reeds). Ahmed Soliman, the son of the onetime keeper of the Temple of Seti, built a simple mudbrick house adjacent to his family home where Omm Sety moved and lived as part of the Soliman family. She reported in her diary that on first moving into her new home, Seti I appeared and carried out a ritual that consecrated the habitation, bowing reverently towards small statues of Osiris and Isis she kept in a small shrine-niche.

During this visit, Seti described the one and only time he saw the god Set, his namesake. As a prelude to meeting Set he fasted for ten days before entering the Chapel of the Great Strength, where the god appeared with "a beauty that cannot be described". On sensing that he was the spirit of all that was cruel and evil, Seti fled to the sound of mocking laughter from the god, never to serve Set again. He counselled that "one should not serve an evil being, even if it appears to have a good or useful attribute or function." Seti made several visits during the following weeks, during which he gave his opinion of the Greek story of Atlantis (a Cretan had once told him that the islands of the Aegean were the tops of mountains from a great land that had sunk into the Mediterranean) and the origins of Osiris ("our Lord came from Amenti, whence he returned").

=== Associations with Egyptologists ===
Omm Sety got to know all the leading Egyptologists of her day during her stay in Abydos. Lanny Bell and William Murnane from Chicago House recalled going "up to Abydos to see Omm Sety, have tea in her place" and then view the temples with her. John Romer recalled taking a bottle of vodka to her home and Omm Sety having fun telling the slightly more ribald stories of the gods and goddesses.

She spoke of Rameses II, the son of Seti I, whom she always saw as a teenager, as when Bentreshyt first knew him. She regarded him, in common with other Egyptologists, as "the most slandered of all the pharaohs" because of biblically derived accounts describing him as the Pharaoh of the Oppression and the slaughterer of baby boys, traits which are contradicted by contemporary records. Kenneth Kitchen, an expert on this period, considered her "a true Ramesside". He said that there was "a certain truth in her familial approach" and that she "came to all sorts of perfectly sensible conclusions about the actual, objective material of the Seti Temple."

Nicholas Kendall of the National Film Board of Canada visited Egypt in 1979 to make a documentary, The Lost Pharaoh: The Search for Akhenaten. Donald Redford, who had led a team that recently unearthed material relating to the reign of Akhenaten, asked Omm Sety to appear in the film. She, in common with other Egyptologists, did not regard the king as a romantic idealist dedicated to a universal god, but a "one-track minded, authoritarian iconoclast who impaled captives and deported populations."

In October 1980, Julia Cave and a team from the BBC arrived in Abydos to film the documentary Omm Sety and Her Egypt. Featuring interviews with Egyptologists T. G. H. James and Rosalie David, it described Abydos and the excavations that had been undertaken. It had extensive input from Omm Sety, who used crutches due to her deteriorating health. The documentary was broadcast on BBC 2 in May 1981. The Times wrote of the documentary: "An incredulous smile froze on my lips as I watched the Chronicle film Omm Sety and Her Egypt. Could I be absolutely positive it was all a lot of eyewash? Of course I couldn't. And neither will you be able to. In any case, it makes marvellous television." At the time the BBC were recording their documentary, the American producer Miriam Birch asked Omm Sety to appear, along with Egyptologists Kent Weeks and Lanny Bell, in a documentary that National Geographic Channel was filming, Egypt: Quest for Eternity. It concentrated on Rameses II, the son of Seti I. Shooting took place in March 1981, coinciding with Omm Sety's seventy-seventh birthday party at Chicago House, which was filmed. She was in a lot of pain but full of good cheer, and the film crew carried her up to the Temple of Seti for filming. This was to be her last visit to the shrine in which she believed she had served as a priestess 3,000 years before.

Omm Seti had once said "Death holds no terror for me ... I'll just do my best to get through the Judgment. I'm going to come before Osiris, who will probably give me a few dirty looks because I know I've committed some things I shouldn't have." Because the Muslims and Christians would not let "a heathen" be buried in their graveyards, Omm Sety built her own underground tomb decorated with a false door. Through this door the Ka was believed to travel between this world and the next, and it was engraved with an offering prayer in conformance with ancient beliefs. The staff of Chicago House gave her an imitation Shawabti figurine to place in the tomb. On 10 April 1981, she gave away her two cats as her condition deteriorated. On 15 April she received a letter from Olivia Robertson confirming that Omm Sety had been enrolled in the Fellowship of Isis, an interfaith spiritual movement focused on the goddess, on 23 March. On 21 April 1981, Omm Sety died in Abydos. The local health authority refused to allow her to be buried in the tomb she had constructed, so she was interred in an unmarked grave, facing the west, in the desert outside a Coptic cemetery.

== Possible sites for archaeological exploration ==
In the early 1970s, shortly after Nasser's death, Omm Sety disclosed that she believed she knew the location of Nefertiti's tomb, but showed some reluctance in disclosing its "most unlikely place" because Seti I did not like Akhenaten for his attempt to suppress traditional Egyptian religious practices. "We don't want anything more of this family to be known." She described the location of the tomb as being close to Tutankhamun's, which was counter to the then-prevailing opinion that no more new tombs would be found in the Valley of the Kings. In 1998, the ARPT group led by Nicholas Reeves began exploring in the area of Tutankhamun's tomb, based on two anomalies found during a sonar sounding in 1976. During the dig, two undisturbed seals of the 20th dynasty scribe Wen-nefer, a well-known person whose seal has been found on many Valley tombs, were discovered. A radar scan in 2000 produced evidence of two empty chambers, but the work was halted pending an investigation into the theft of antiquities. In 2006, Otto Schaden, on a completely unrelated dig, accidentally burst into one of the "anomalies" (later numbered KV63), which contained particularly fine examples of mummification supplies used for a royal burial, presumably nearby. Reeves' opinion is that the second "anomaly" is likely to be an undisturbed tomb. In August 2015, a new paper was published by the egyptologist Nicholas Reeves, likely confirming the finding.

While the general public tend to focus on the beauty of ancient Egyptian artefacts, scholars highly value texts which reveal more about history and religious beliefs. Since Edgar Cayce, a clairvoyant of Presbyterian background, asserted while in a trance state that a Hall of Records was to be found in the area of the Sphinx, there have been repeated attempts to find its supposed location. In 1973, Omm Sety recalled asking Seti I about these Halls of Records. He replied that every temple had a book repository ("Per-Medjat"), but that the one attached to the Temple of Amun-Ra in Luxor contained all the important documents "from the time of the Ancestors," including those that survived the political upheaval at the end of the 6th dynasty. In 1952, Omm Sety translated for Abdul Kader inscriptions from Ram statues he had uncovered from the temple at Luxor. They had been found in the area where Seti located the Hall of Records. Contrary to normal practice for this type of statue, there was no writing on the back, suggesting that they had once been placed against an otherwise unknown wall or building. Based on Seti's description and the location of the Rams, both she and Dr. Zeini believed that the Hall of Records is likely to be located under the modern building which houses the Arab Socialist League.

== Legacy ==
According to the late John Albert Wilson, head of the Oriental Institute, and called the "dean of American Egyptology" by contemporaries, Omm Sety deserved to be treated as "a responsible scholar". She was a source for modern scholarship seeking to understand how traditional ancient religious practices have survived into modern times, as "folk customs" practiced by modern Egyptian Copts and Muslims. Unlike other people who claimed to be reincarnated figures from ancient Egypt, she was treated with respect by Egyptologists, and whilst none publicly subscribed to the phenomena she reported, none doubted her sincerity and many have used her observations of past and present Egypt as reliable source material.

Kent Weeks wrote that scholars have "never doubted the accuracy of Omm Sety's field observations. As an ethnographer, a participant-observer of modern Egyptian village life, Omm Sety has had few equals. Her studies easily hold their own next to the works of Lane, Blackman, Henein, and others who have examined Egypt's long and fascinating cultural traditions".

Egyptologists who knew Omm Sety were impressed by her knowledge of ancient Egypt. Klaus Baer of the Oriental Institute commented that "she had visions and worshipped the ancient Egyptian gods. But she understood the methods and standards of scholarship, which is usually not the case with nuts", nor did she "desire to convert anyone". Omm Sety was impressed by Hermann Junker, "one of the elders of 20th century archaeology", who had taught Selim Hassan. He advocated a more honest approach to the study of ancient Egyptian religion, believing that "nobody had made a real effort to go deeply enough into it". She admired his open-mindedness, especially since Junker was also a Catholic priest. One noted Egyptologist, who did not wish to be named, commented "I was deeply shocked when, one night, I attended a party given by Dr. Ahmed Fakhry behind the Great Pyramid ... and there under the full moon was Dorothy Eady belly dancing! I couldn't believe my eyes!". William Murnane of the Oriental Institute recalled "It was always a pleasure to be with her and listen to whatever she said ... you really couldn't take her anything but seriously".

Kenneth Kitchen, author of the seven-volume "Ramesside Inscriptions", described Omm Sety as a "true Ramesside" who "came to all sorts of conclusions about the actual objective material of the Seti Temple – which may have also coincided with things that she felt she knew some other way ... and that paid dividends". Donald Redford invited Omm Sety to appear in the documentary "The Lost Pharaoh", in which she gives her description of Akhenaten, including a negative view of the religious revolution he attempted (comparing him to the Ayatollah Khomeini – "a fanatic"), a viewpoint broadly shared by scholars such as Seton-Williams and Redford.

John A. Wilson of the Oriental Institute of Chicago praised her book "Abydos, Holy city of Ancient Egypt" for its "comprehensive coverage of every ancient element in Abydos". During a visit to the Great Pyramid by a Japanese team with sophisticated sensing equipment, one English Egyptologist, with nods of approval from others, said "If Omm Sety were still here I'd take her word for where things can be found, any day, over the most-state-of-the-art equipment out there". William Simpson, Professor of Egyptology at Yale, considered Omm Sety to be a "delightful person" and thought that "a great many people in Egypt took advantage of her because she more or less traded her knowledge of ancient Egypt by writing or helping people out by doing drafting for them for a pittance". Dr. Labib Habachi, one of "two leading Egyptian archaeologists of his day" and a great admirer of Dorothy Eady's work, claimed that she was a ghost writer.

James P. Allen commented "Sometimes you weren't sure whether Omm Sety wasn't pulling your leg. Not that she was a phoney in what she said or believed – she was absolutely not a con artist – but she knew that some people looked on her as a crackpot, so she kind of fed into that notion and let you go either way with it ... She believed enough to make it spooky, and it made you doubt your own sense of reality sometimes". Barbara Lesko wrote, "She was a great help to Egyptian scholars, especially Hassan and Fakhry, correcting their English and writing English language articles for others. So this poorly educated Englishwoman developed in Egypt into a first rate draughtswoman and prolific and talented writer who, even under her own name, produced articles, essays, monographs and books of great range, wit and substance." William Golding wrote of the Egyptologists he met in his travels through Egypt in the 1980s who were "as well disposed to the Mystery as any child could have wished". When "the question arose of a dear lady who believed herself to have been a priestess of a particular temple, they did not dismiss her as a crackpot but agreed that 'she had something'".

Carl Sagan considered Omm Sety "a lively, intelligent, dedicated woman who made real contributions to Egyptology. This is true whether her belief in reincarnation is fact or fantasy". He pointed out that there was no independent record, other than her own accounts, to verify what she claimed. In his opinion, whilst "functioning soundly and constructively in most aspects of her adult life" she "nevertheless carried strong childhood, adolescent fantasies" into adulthood. A psychiatrist who specialized in adolescent behaviour speculated that Dorothy Eady's fall down stairs as a child may have resulted in damage to the locus ceruleus, which could have resulted in a dislocation from her surroundings resulting in the embracement of an obsession. The psychologist Michael Gruber noted that Omm Sety lived "a functional life in so-called everyday reality", including work in Egyptology, embroidery, making jewellery and socializing with people. Her reported experiences enriched her life so much that "it would be an extreme loss to have seen her simply as someone who was hallucinating". A 1987 New York Times article by John Anthony West described a biography of her as an "intriguing and convincing modern case histor[y]" of the belief in reincarnation.

== Publications ==
- "A Dream of the Past", 1949, Egyptian State Tourist Board
- "A Question of Names", 1970, American Research Centre in Egypt, Newsletter 71, pp. 10–15
- "Some Miraculous Wells and Springs of Egypt", 1970, American Research Centre in Egypt, Newsletter 75, pp. 17–22
- "Warding off an Eclipse" 1972, American Research Centre in Egypt, Newsletter 80, pp. 25–27
- "Omm Sety's Abydos", 1979–80, 1982, Journal of the Society for the Study of Egyptian Antiquities
- Abydos: Holy City of Ancient Egypt, 1981, with H. El Zeini
- Survivals from Ancient Egypt
- Pharaoh: Democrat or Despot, with Hanny El Zeini, unpublished as of 2011

== Sources ==
- The Search for Omm Sety, Jonathan Cott in collaboration with Dr. Hanny El Zeini, Doubleday & Company, 1987, ISBN 0-385-23746-4
- Omm Sety's Living Egypt: Surviving folkways from Pharaonic Times, Omm Sety (author), Edited by Nicole B. Hansen, Glyphdoctors Chicago, 2008, ISBN 978-0-9792023-0-8
- Omm Sety's Egypt, Hanny el Zeini & Catherine Dees, T Lynn's Press, 2007, ISBN 978-0-9767631-3-0
- Breaking Ground: Women in Old World Archaeology: Omm Sety, Barbara Lesko -PDF
