= HNW (disambiguation) =

HNW is the station code for Hamilton West railway station, in South Lanarkshire, Scotland

HNW may also refer to:

- Hannu, majordomo to Menuhotep III
- Hennu, a symbol of the god Seker of Memphis
- Hidayat Nur Wahid, an Indonesian politician
- High-net-worth individual
- Harsh noise wall, a subgenre of noise music
