= Abydos graffiti =

Ancient graffiti engraved on the walls of the Temple of Seti I at Abydos, Egypt

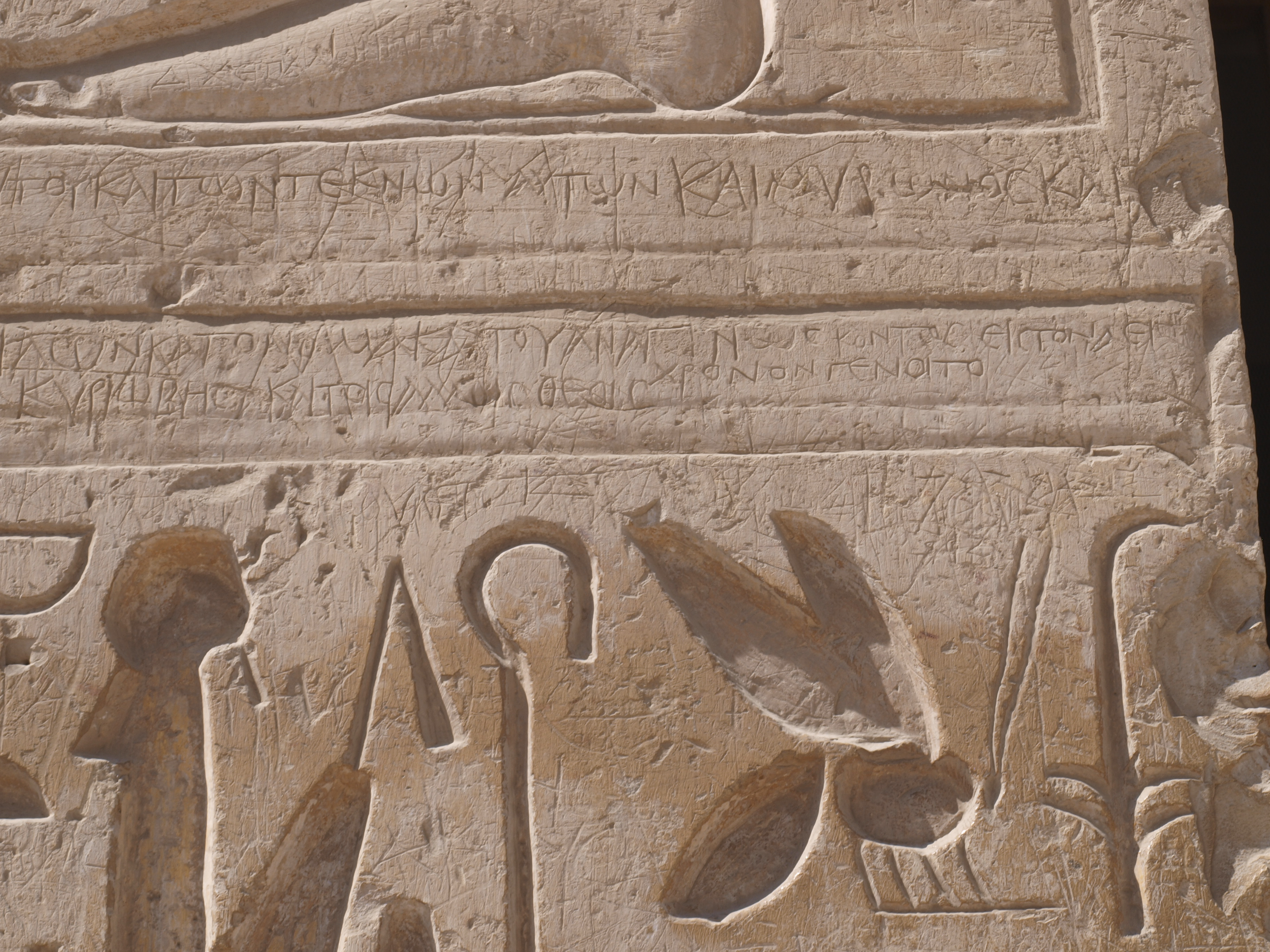
- Phoenician graffiti (right hand side) at the Temple of Seti I
- Type: Graffiti
- Writing: Phoenician and Aramaic
- Discovered: 1855; Temple of Seti I
- Discovered by: Théodule Devéria
- Present location: Egypt
- Identification: KAI 49; CIS I 99-110; RÉS 1302ff

The Abydos graffiti is Phoenician and Aramaic graffiti found on the walls of the Temple of Seti I at Abydos, Egypt. The inscriptions are known as KAI 49, CIS I 99-110 and RÉS 1302ff.

Much of the graffiti represents prayers and votive dedications.

Prior to the discovery of the Abydos graffiti, very few Semitic inscriptions had been found in Egypt – a few Aramaic texts, the Abu Simbel Phoenician graffiti (published by Ampère, Lepsius, and Graham), and an engraved sphinx found in the Serapeum of Saqqara. Abydos was considered to contain the tomb of Osiris, the god of the afterlife, hence it was considered a holy burial place and attracted pilgrimage.

== Discovery ==
The first Phoenician and Aramaic graffiti was recorded by Théodule Devéria during Mariette's excavations at Abydos; 13 inscriptions were published in 1868 by Hermann Zotenberg. Heinrich Karl Brugsch subsequently made notes of 16 inscriptions. The inscriptions of Deveria and Brugsch were published in the first edition of Corpus Inscriptionum Semiticarum.

In 1885, Joseph Derenbourg and his son Hartwig published an interpretation of 61 inscriptions noted by Archibald Sayce on a visit in 1883.

A small amount of further graffiti was published by Margaret Murray in 1904, together with her excavations at the Osireion (note that no Phoenician or Aramaic graffiti was found on the Osireion which, unlike the other temples, had been hidden underground for many centuries). The Phoenician graffiti was found to be "roughly scratched on the walls, even more roughly than the Greek".

== Concordance ==
Deveria	CIS I	Brugsch	Sayce
1	99	6, 16	18
2	100a-b	-	-
4	-	-	5
6	101	-	25
7	-	-	4
8	102a-d	1, 2, 10	36–38, 40
9	-	-	61
10	103a-c	-	21-23
11	104	-	-
12	105	-	1
13	-	-	41
-	106	8, 13	2
-	110	-	3
-	109	15	19
-	107	12	31
-	108	14	-

== Gallery of handwritten notes ==
=== CIS, including Deveria and Brugsch ===
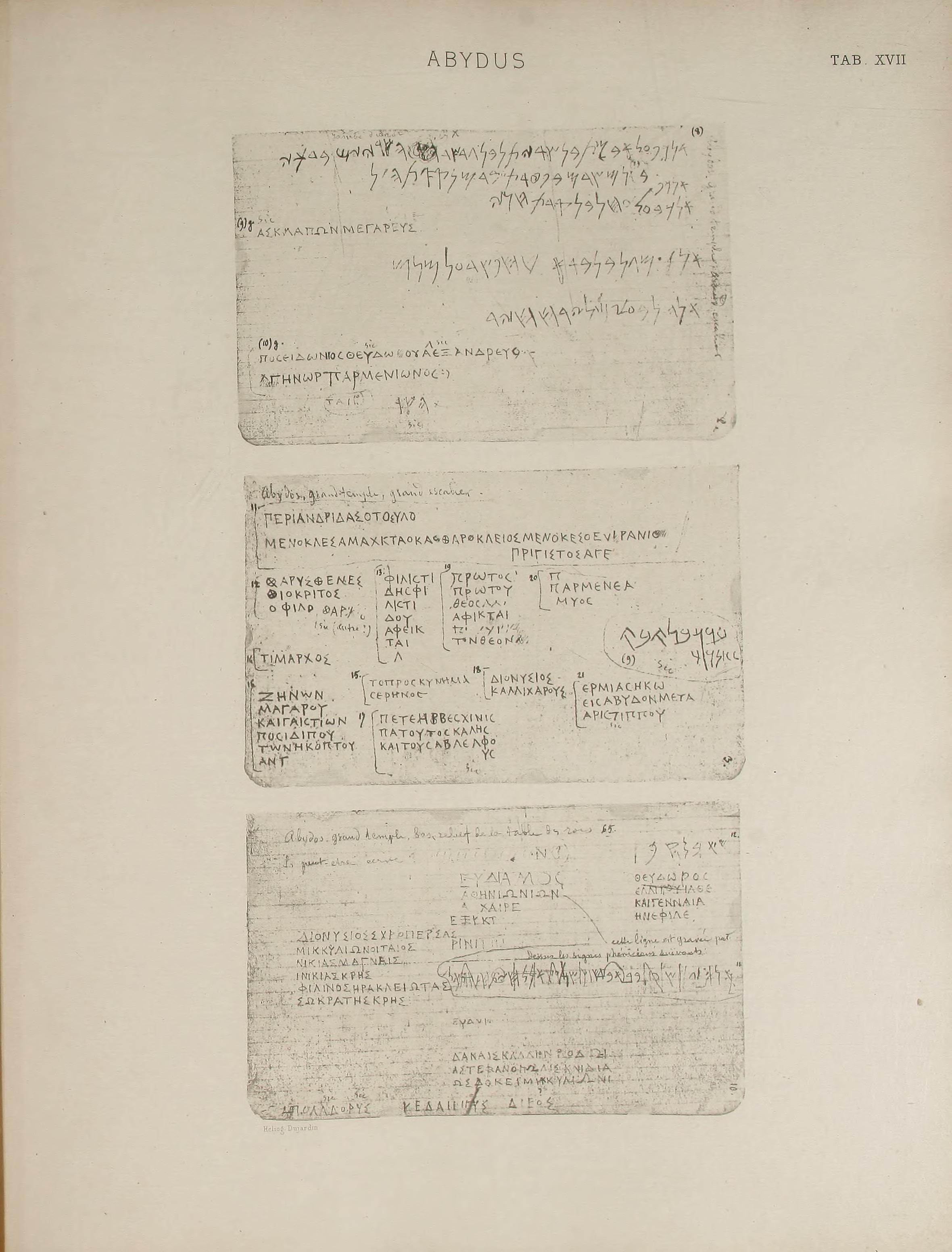
Deveria 8, 9, 11

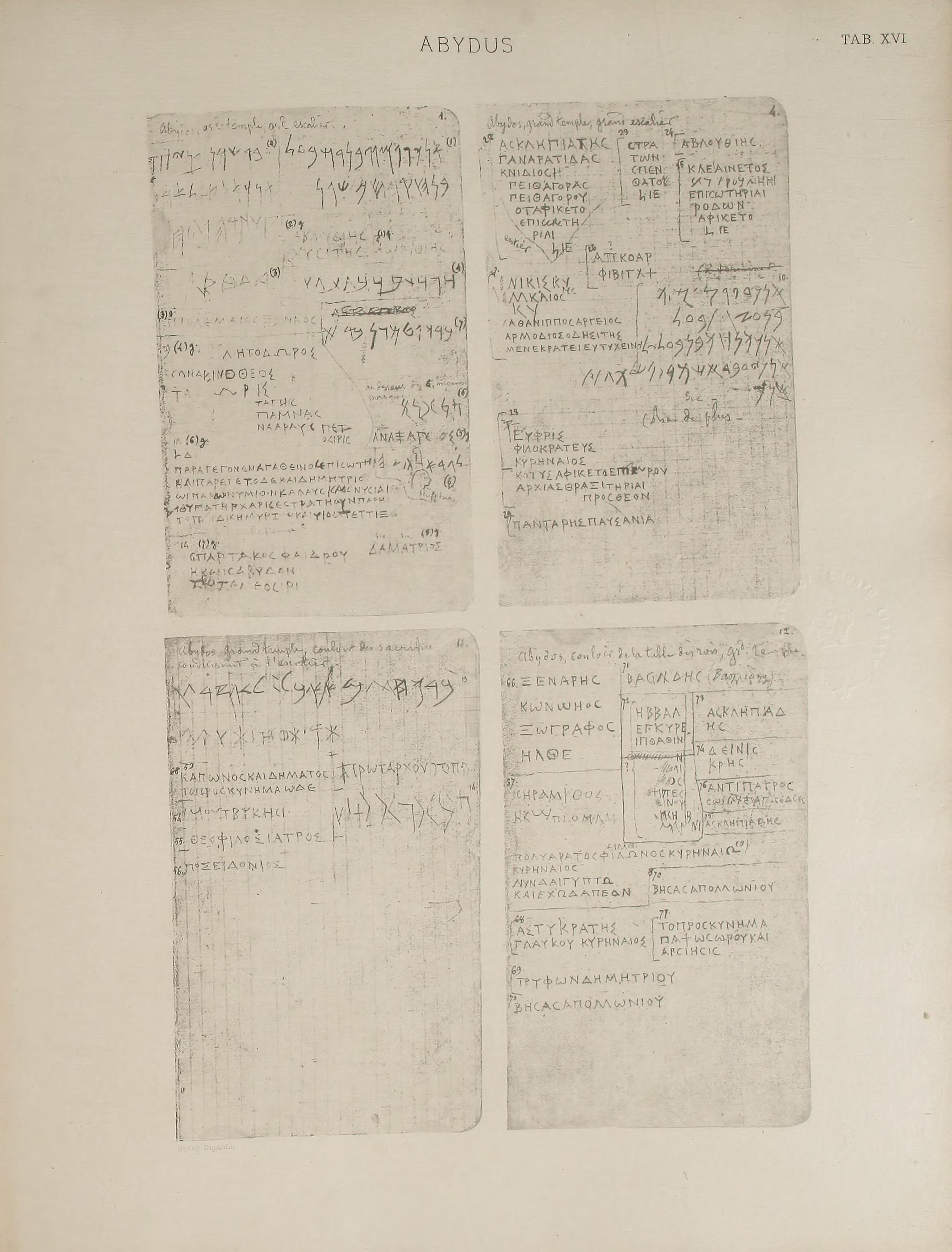
Deveria 1–7, 10, 12-13

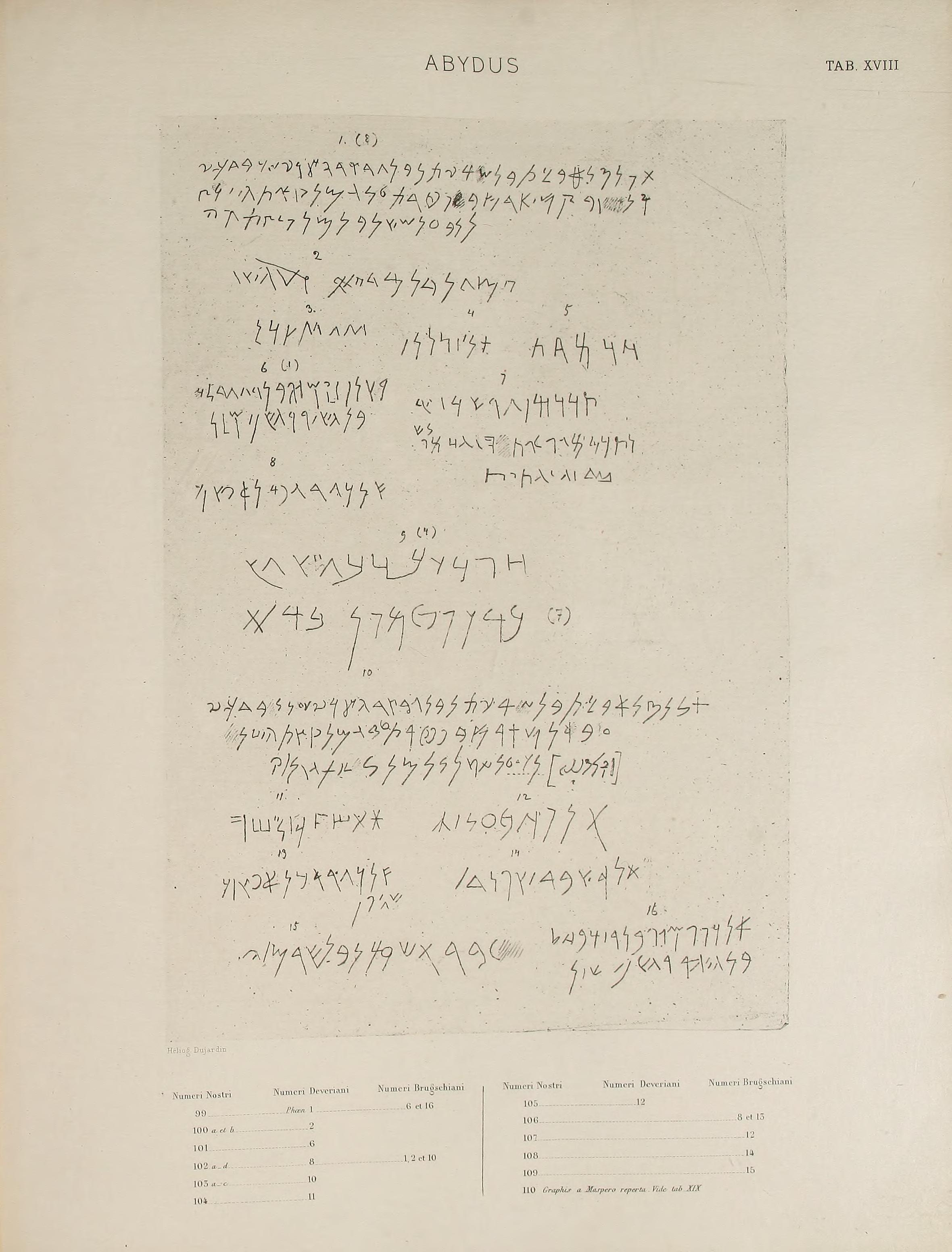
Brugsch 1-16

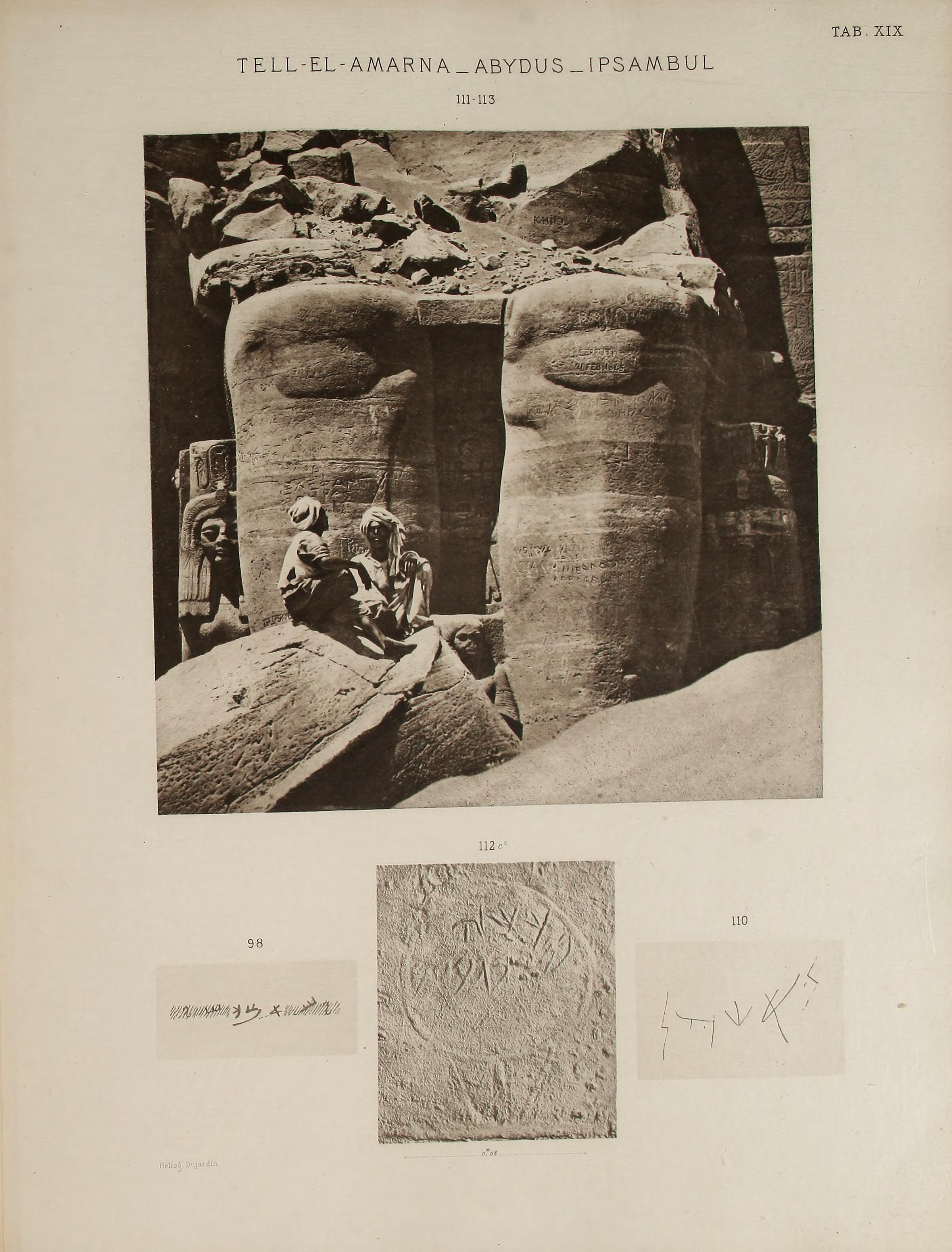
CIS I 98, 110

=== Murray ===
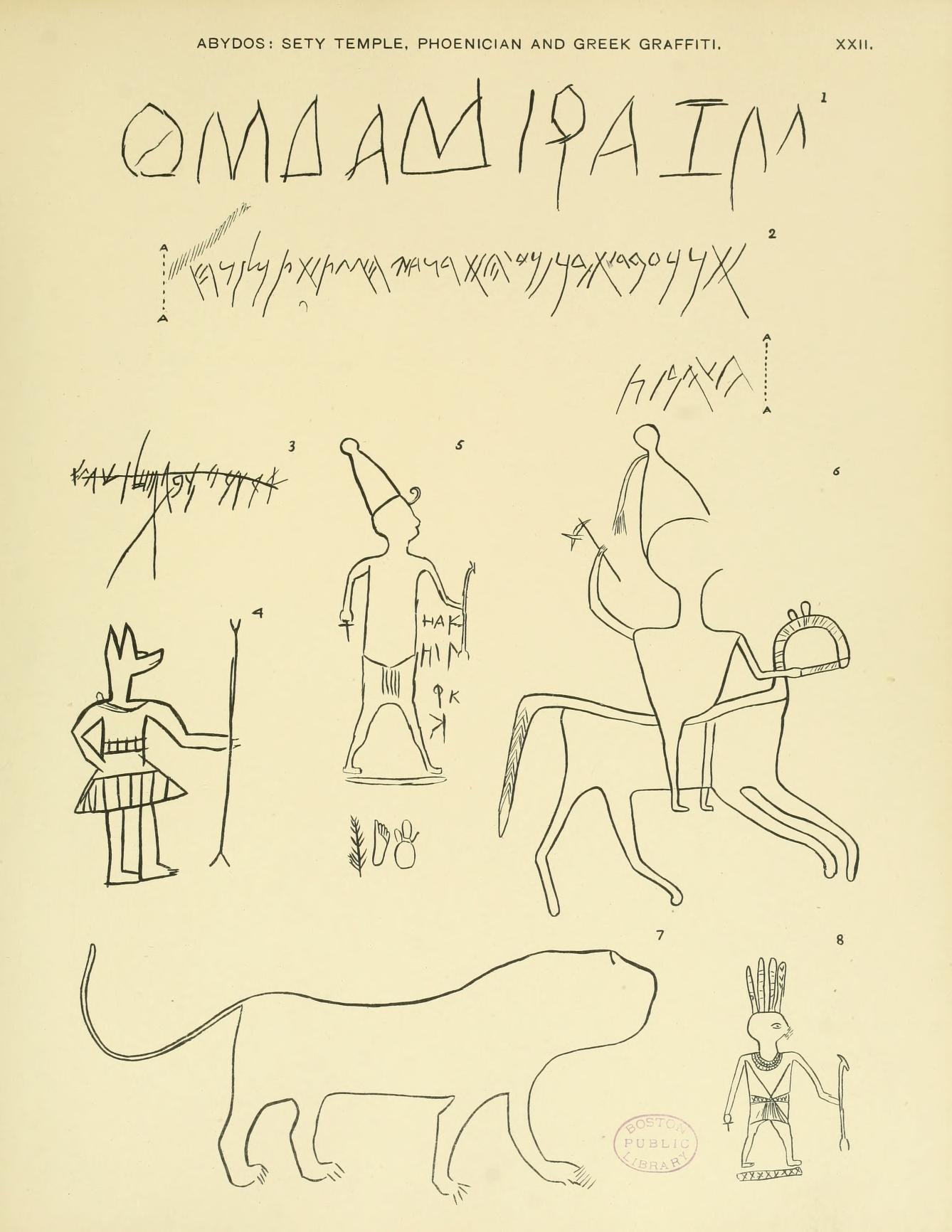

=== Sayce ===
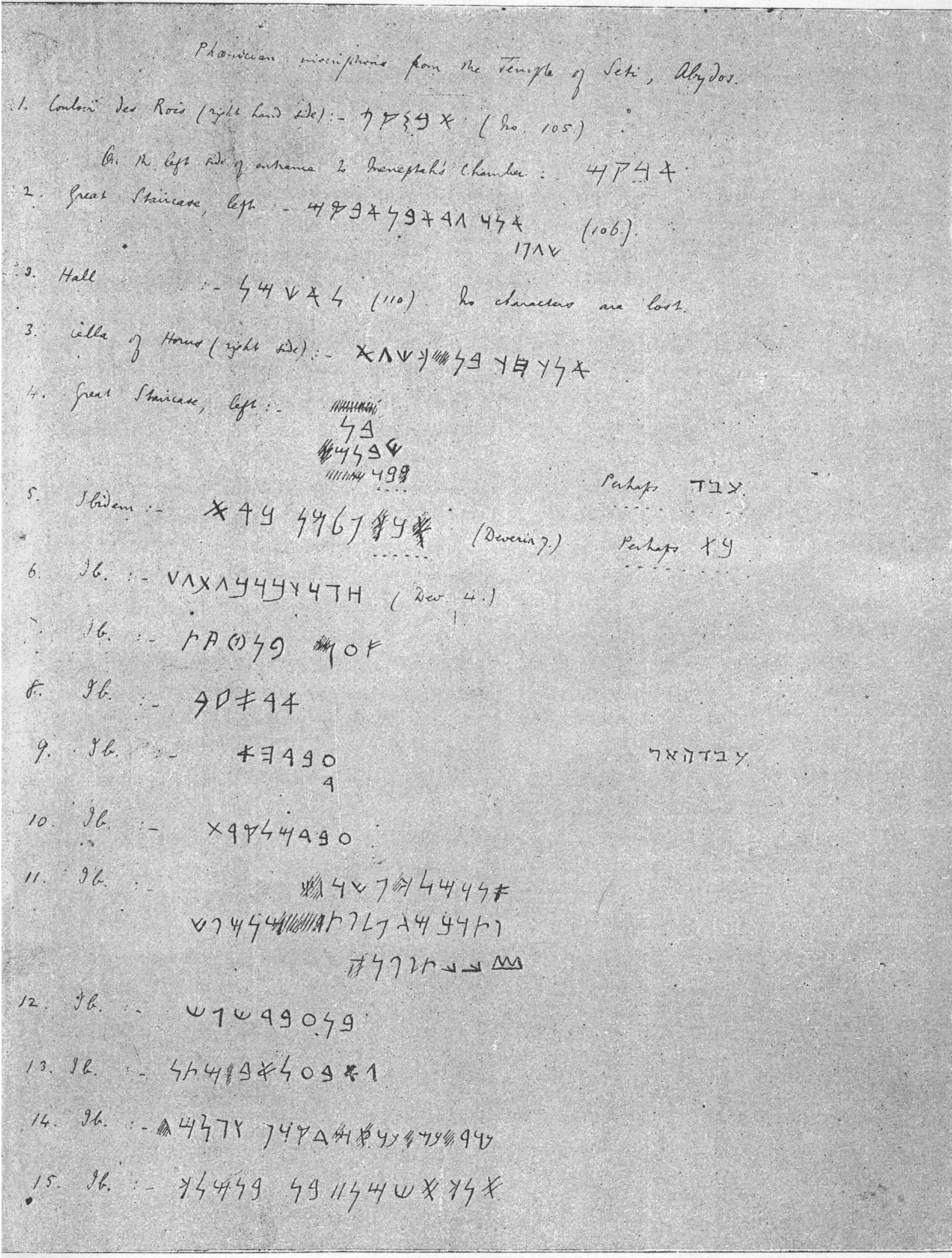
Sayce 1-15

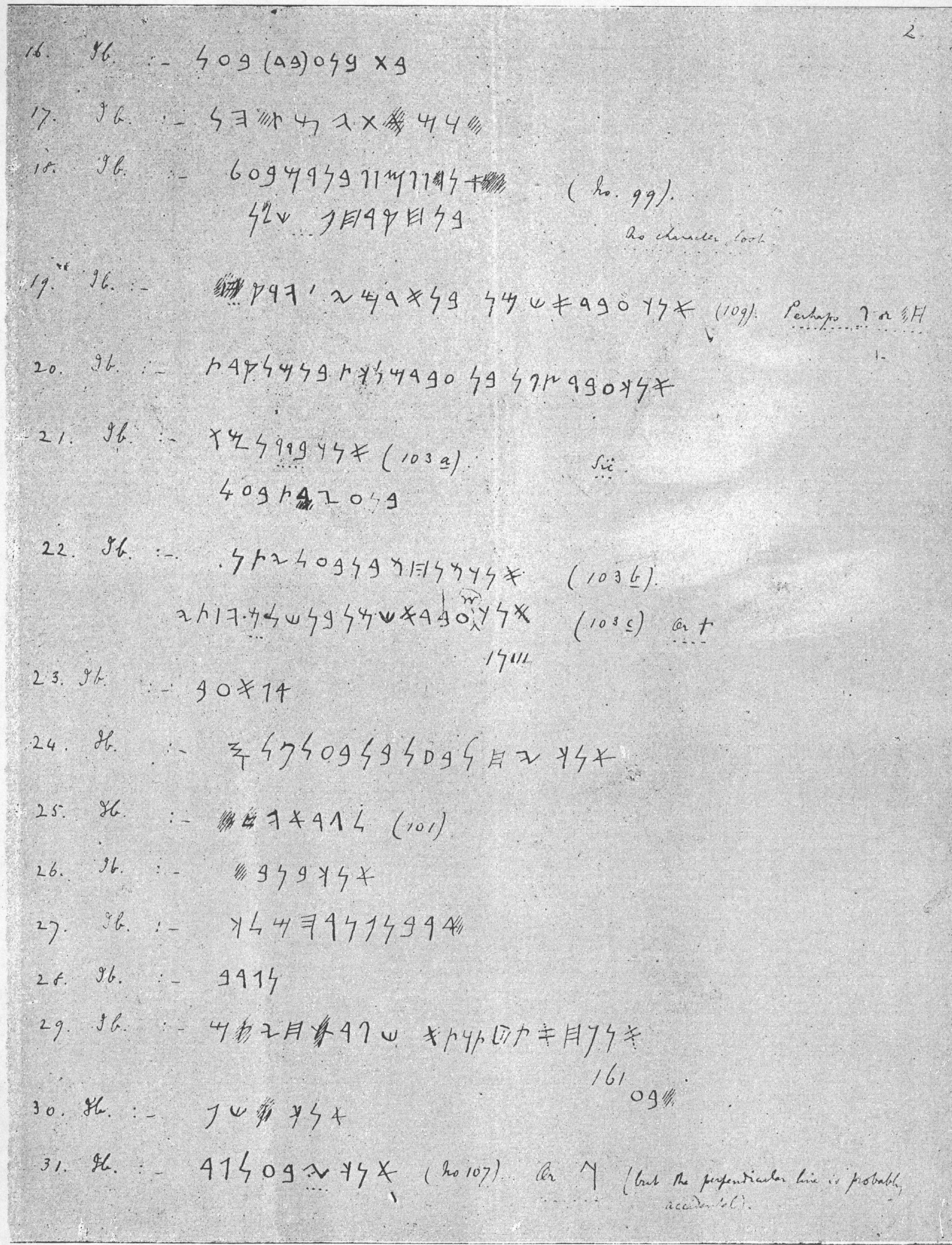
Sayce 16-31

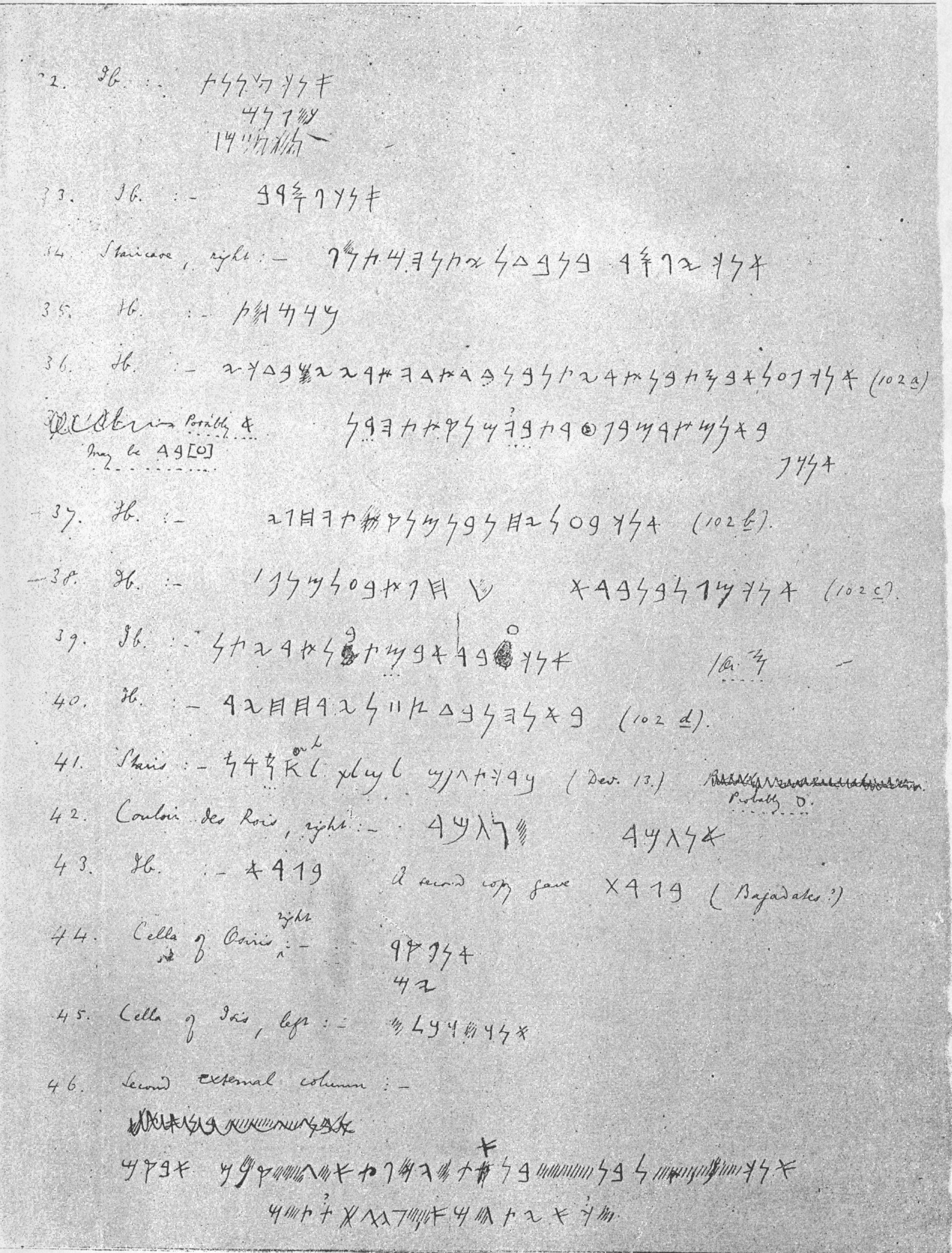
Sayce 32-46

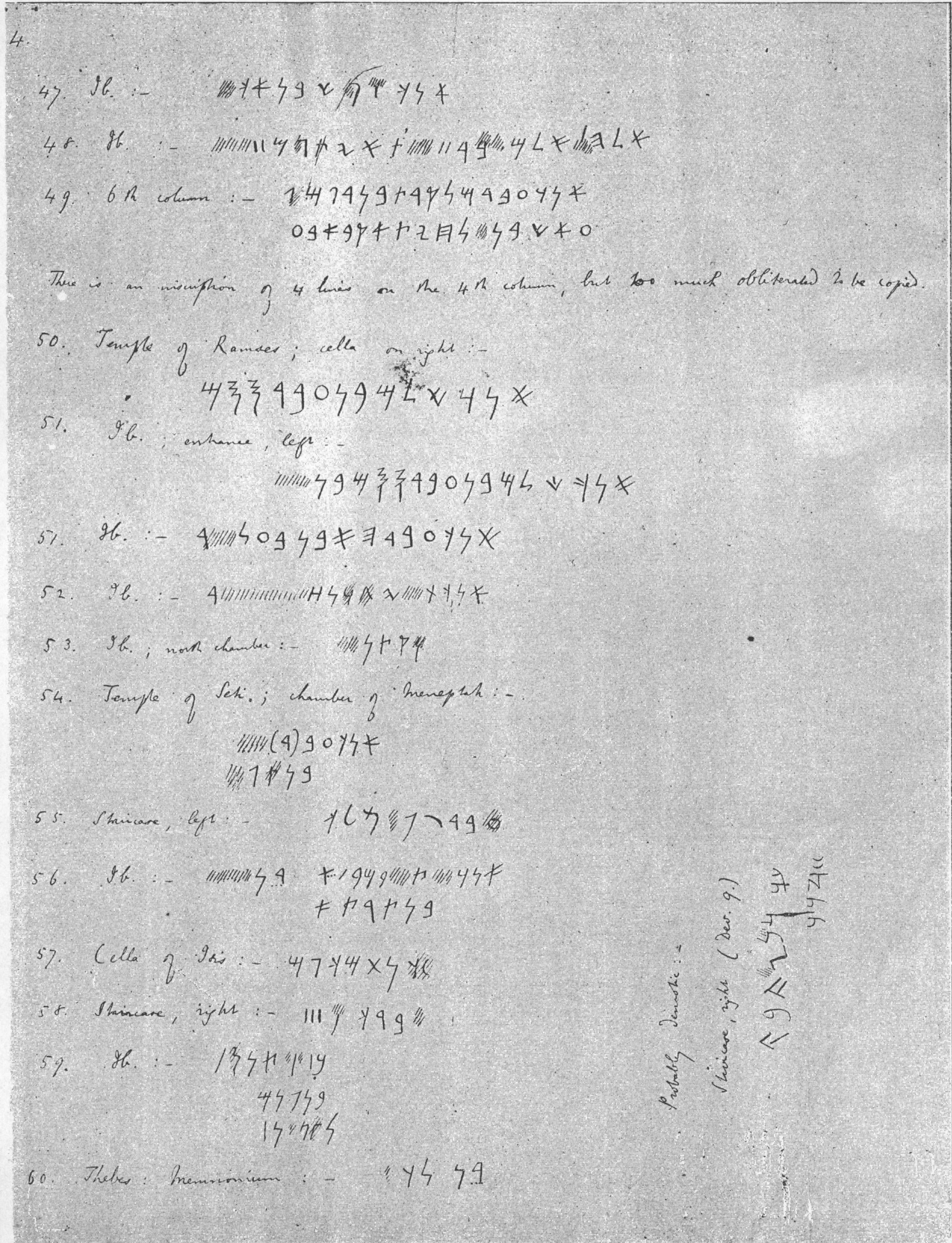
Sayce 47-61

== Bibliography ==
- Zotenberg, H., "Nouvelles inscriptions phéniciennes d'Égypte." JA sér. 6, t. 11 (1868): 431–50 + 2 pls (also at BNF, including full plate scans)
- Levy, M.A., "Inschriften aus Abydos in Aegypten." Pp. 14–35 + 1 pl. In Phönizische Studien., Breslau: Schletter, 1870
- Derenbourg, J., & Derenbourg, H. (1885). LES INSCRIPTIONS PHÉNICIENNES DU TEMPLE DE SETI À ABYDOS, PUBLIÉES ET TRADUITES D'APRÈS UNE COPIE INÉDITE DE M. SAYCE. Revue D'Assyriologie Et D'archéologie Orientale, 1(3), 81-101
- Murray, M.A., The Osireion at Abydos. Egyptian Research Account, Ninth Year, 1903 . London: B. Quaritch, 1904
- Kornfeld, W., "Neues über die phonikischen und aramäischen Graffiti in den Tempeln vom Abydos." ÖAW, 115 (1978a): 193–204 + 18 pls.
