= Temple of Seti I (Abydos) =

Archaeological site in Egypt

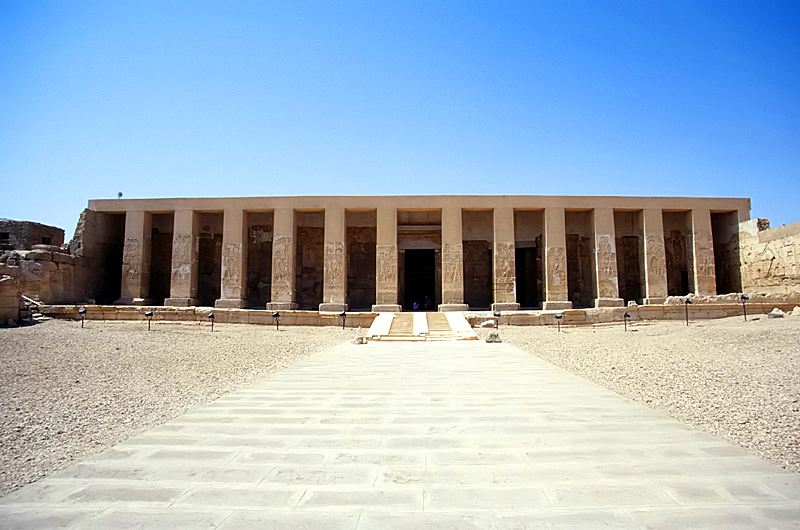
Colonadded Façade of the Temple of Seti I, built c. 1300 BC, view from the main courtyard

The Temple of Seti I (also known as the Great Temple of Abydos, in antiquity, known as "Menmaatre Happy in Abydos,") is a significant historical site in Abydos, Egypt. Abydos is a significant location with its connection to kingship due to being the burial site of the proto-kings from the Pre-Dynastic period, First Dynasty kings, and the location of the Cult of Osiris.

Initially, construction started in the 13th century BC under the 19th Dynasty Pharaoh Seti I, also known as Sethos. However, construction was not completed before his death and was continued by his son, Ramesses II. The temple was built in order to commemorate and worship the earlier pharaohs of Egypt as well as the major gods of the Egyptian pantheon. Ramesses II continued the construction and decoration of the temple, making changes to its design and adding inscriptions. At the Temple of Ramesses II at Abydos, Ramesses states that "son arose in his father place, none of them restored the monument of him who begot him."

The Temple of Seti I was designed with a standard layout from the Ramesside period featuring a "L" shaped design constructed of limestone and sandstone possibly brought from Gebel Silsila. The temple boast many features, including the first and second courts that house hypostyle halls, chapels to Seti I and various gods, and the Osireion. The South wing houses the Gallery of the Kings, which leads to a slaughter court and four secondary rooms, which continues into the Corridor of Bulls with a stairway that exits into storage rooms, and the Hall of Barques.

The temple is also notable for the Abydos graffiti which is ancient Phoenician and Aramaic graffiti found on the temple walls. The Temple additionally contains graffito from the 21st dynasty till the Roman period then from Later periods ranging from Aramaic, Phoenician, Carian, Greek and Cypriot.

== Research ==
In 1863, the temple was cleared and reconstructed by Auguste Mariette. In 1901-1902, Flinders Petrie, his wife Hilda Petrie, and Margaret A. Murray further excavated the Temple and discovered the Osireion. After World War I, the temple was studied by Henri Édouard Naville and then by Henri Frankfort. During the 1925-1927 season under the Egyptian Exploration Society and Oriental Institute of the University of Chicago, Herbert Felton recorded the sculptures within the temple through photography. Amice M. Calverley then detailed the temple walls under Aylward M. Blackman. With financial assistance from John D. Rockefeller Jr., this expedition gained the services of Myrtle F. Broome, Hugh Calverley, C. M. Beazley, Charles Little, Linda Holey, and Adriaan de Buck. This work was completed in 1933 consisting of a four-volume work titled The Temple of King Sethos I At Abydos consisting of photos and drawings of the chapels of Osiris, Isis, Horus, Amen-Re, Re-Harakhti, Ptah-Sokar, and Seti, The Osiris Complex, and the Second Hypostyle Hall. John Baines worked the site in 1979 and again from 1981-1983.

== History of temple use ==
The Temple of Seti did not serve as a mortuary temple to carry the Pharaoh cult; instead, it was created to be a part of the Osiris festival. Possibly being used as the final destination on a processional route connected to the Osiris Temple. Following the temple's passing, the temple was reused several times as Ian Rutherford's study has revealed that the temple was in use after the discovery of Greek, Cypriot, Phoenician, and Aramaic inscriptions make references to the Cult of Osiris. During the Late Hellenistic and Early Roman period, graffiti was left that related the temple to the god Serapis, who served as the state god of Egypt during the Ptolemaic Period. Its final use came from the Late Roman Period, being used as an ocular incubation for the god Bes. Individuals who wished to obtain something from the god would possibly leave offerings, talk to the oracle, and sometimes sleep overnight in the temple to have a mystical experience. This is why so much Coptic, Greek, and Latin graffiti can be found within and throughout the temple.

== Features ==
=== First and second courts ===
The temple contains two courts, the first court of the temple is entered through a pylon entrance that portrays Isis, Osiris, Ramesses, and Menereptah. The first court contains inscriptions of Ramesses' battle scenes and scenes of Seti. The Second Court contains scenes of Ramesses interacting with gods. The scenes were used to commemorate Ramesses II's achievements and acceptance as ruler.

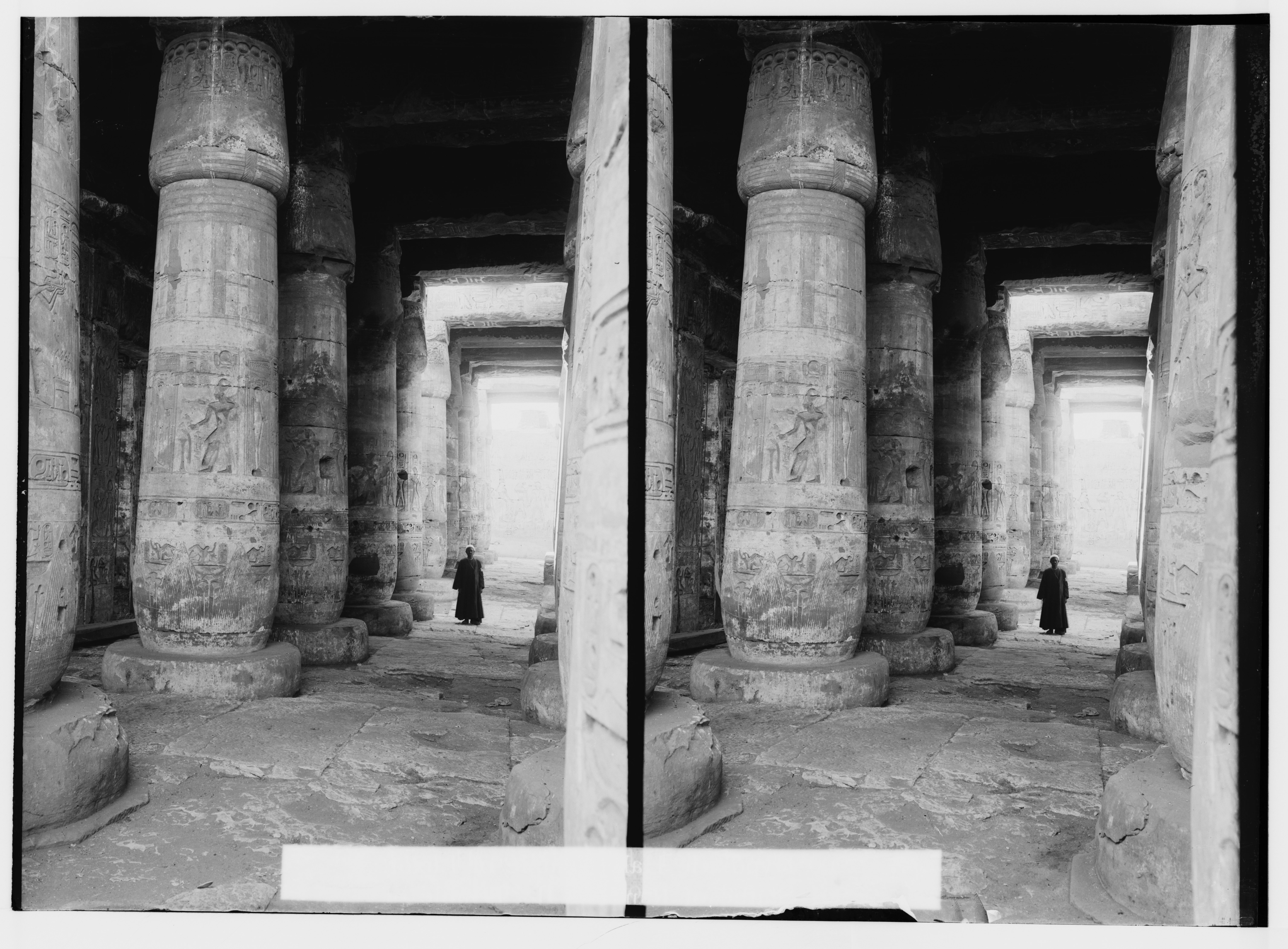
The first hypostyle hall within the Temple of Seti I at Abydos The Gallery of the Lists (Temple of Seti I in Abydos), King List is on the left wall

=== First and second hypostyle halls ===
A hypostyle hall is a large room consisting of many columns to support a roof; the temple's two hypostyle halls may have been the first portion of the temple constructed. Both halls contain columns and reliefs. In the first hall, twelve columns and reliefs were carved by Ramesses II. The first and second hall are divided by a wall and consist of 36 columns.

=== Abydos King List ===
In the Gallery of Ancestors, also referred to as The Gallery of the List, one can find the Abydos King List. This list is depicted in low relief, carved under the reign of Ramesses II, and it shows Seti and Ramesses making offerings to their royal ancestors. These royal ancestors are the past kings of Egypt. Notably, some rulers, like the 15th Dynasty Hyksos that ruled Egypt during the Second Intermediate Period 1650-1550 BCE and the reign of the 18th Dynasty heretic Akhenaten of the New Kingdom 1550-1069, were omitted from the list, possibly due to being associated with periods of internal weakness and divisions. The Gallery of Ancestors led into the storerooms, desert behind the temple, and the slaughterhouse.

=== Slaughterhouse ===
The slaughterhouse would have been used to offer offerings to the temple's gods. The slaughterhouse provided access to the desert through its eastern entrance and was connected to the temple through The Gallery of Ancestors to its north. Consisting of a slaughter court, hall, and three rooms, each consisting of depictions of offerings. The court contained depictions of Seti offering meats to the gods, such as the scenes with Osiris, Isis, Horus, and Wepwawet. The Hall contained scenes of animal butchery with priests carrying off the offerings to be used in processions. The Gallery of Ancestors contains scenes that continue these ritual offerings with the king purifying the meat.

=== Chapels ===
The temple contains six barque chapels, completed by Seti I's death, in a row dedicated to the gods Osiris, Isis, Horus, Amen-Rem, Re-Harakti, and Ptah. Additionally, there is one more chapel belonging to Seti, which is meant to represent Seti as a god. The first three chapels, dedicated to that of Osiris, Isis, and Horus, are intended to represent the principal gods of Egypt's religion and the triad of Abydos. The following three gods are the principal gods of the country, representing their cities, with Amen-Re representing Thebes, Re-Harakti representing Heliopolis, and Ptah representing Memphis. The chapels originally had alleys that lead to seven exits at the front of the temples which would have served as used to move barques for processions, until the exits were filled in by Ramesses II.

==== Osiris Fetish ====
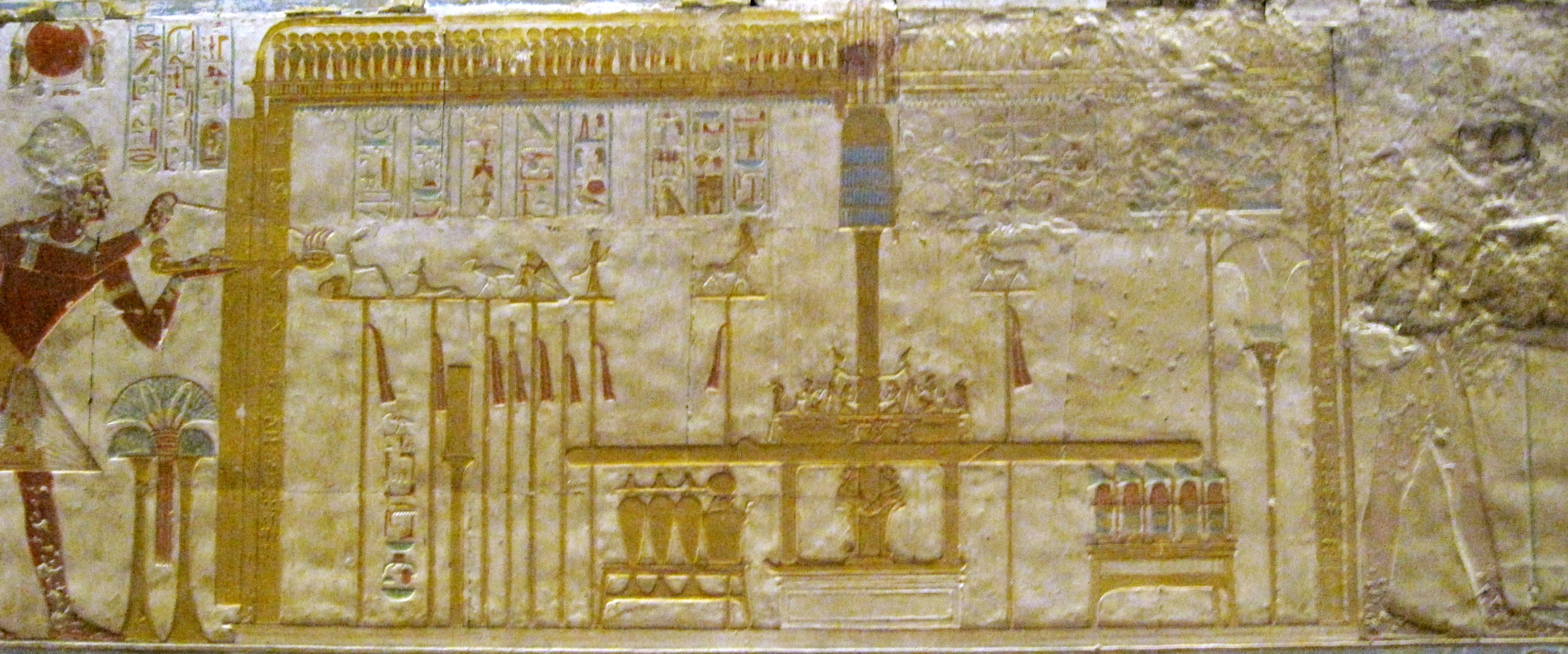
The Osiris Fetish located within the Osiris Chapel on its South wall.

The south wall of the Osiris Chapel features an image known as the Osiris Fetish which establishes a connection between solar imagery and the god Osiris. However, this is not the only depiction of the fetish as similar images can be found in the temple of Ramesses II and the Chaple of Ramesses I. The fetish contains imagery that is associated with the sun, as there are representations of lions possibly related to the god Aker, symbolizing the horizons, sunrise, and sunset. Within the image, there is a traditional henu gesture being performed which signifies obedience and submission to a god, as well as symbolically used during rituals to animate the king's soul. The imagery of the sun countries as next to the fetish depiction of rams adorned with the solar headdress, possibly representing the sun crossing into the underworld as the god Mendes. The fetish may have been exposed to the public when the barque was carried by priests during a procession alongside a “corn” mummy used to represent Osiris, as the wall opposite of the fetish depicts which underscores Osiris' role in regeneration.

=== Osireion ===
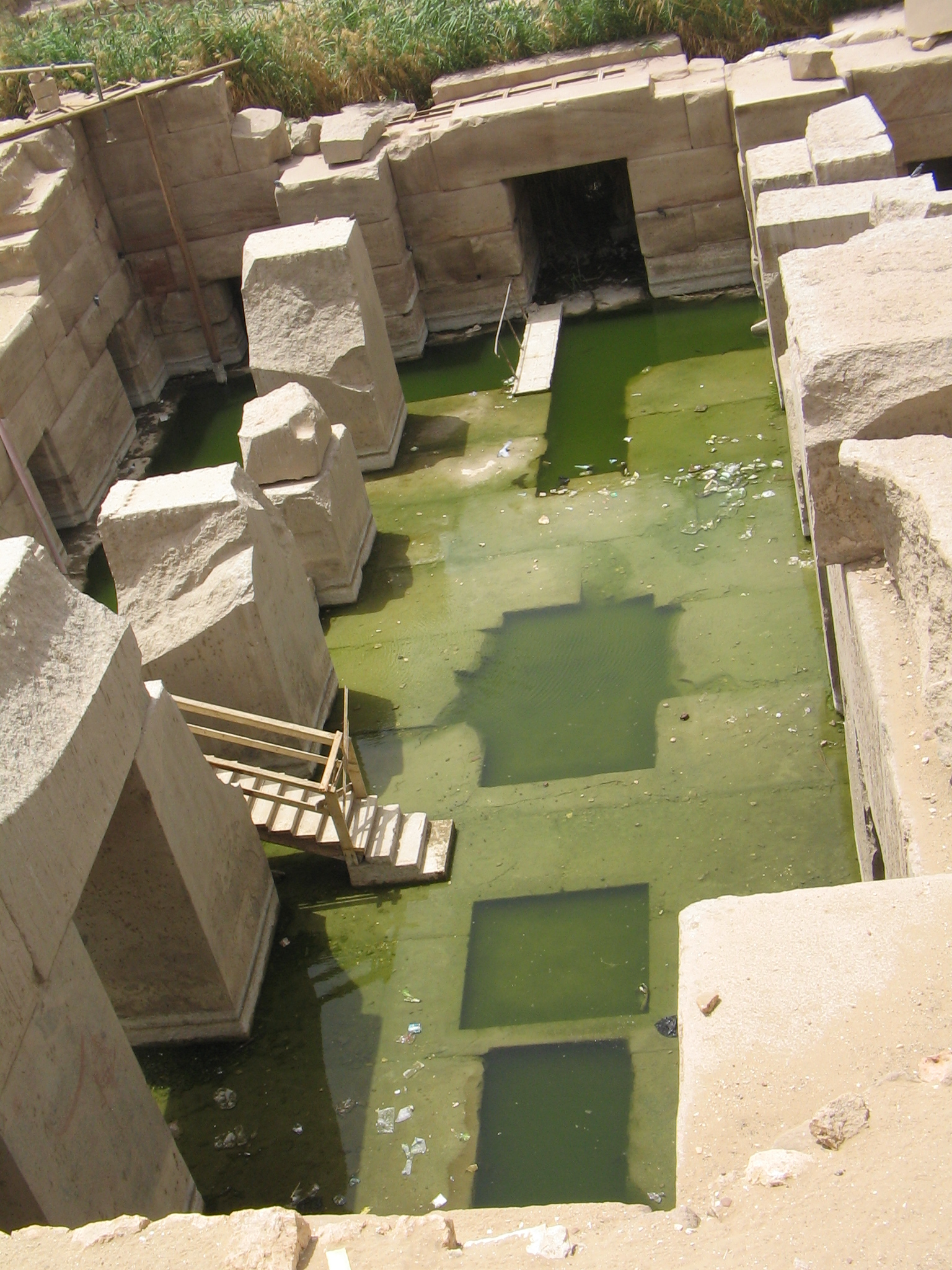
The Osireion located behind the Temple of Seti I, filling with water from the rising Nile.

The Osireion is the symbolic tomb of Osiris, created of red granite and sandstone that housed a sarcophagus and a chest for canopic jars. This sarcophagus was possibly surrounded with floodwater in order to grow barley that would have ritually been used for symbolic resurrection of Osiris allowing the Osireion to serve as a center for the cult of Osiris.

Unfortunately, parts of the Osireion now have water due to the Aswan dam raising water. The Osireion, meaning "Menmaatre beneficial to Osiris" or sometimes called the Osiris Complex, is located behind the temple chapels in the shape of a rectangle being 57m by 13m, consisting of eight rooms. The Osireion is linked via transverse access from the Osiris chapel leading to a staircase that descended into a symbolic tomb of the God Osiris. Inside this tomb, Osiris's Cenotaph was located. The Cenotaph was crafted in an 18th Dynasty tomb design mimicking those of the Valley of the Kings. While the entrance to the Osierion was through the Osiris Chapel, there was an additional entrance that went beyond the temple's enclosure walls. These entrances were adorned with religious texts such as the Book of the Dead and the Book of Caves, which the tunnel filled with scenes of the afterlife completed by Seti's grandson Merenptah.

== Economy ==
=== Temple economy ===
Within Ancient Egypt, major temples were considered the reserve banks of their times that would hold excessive amounts of grains, with granaries possibly delivering goods of bread and beer to temples. Temples consisted of priesthoods and required funding to ensure proper production and operations. One type of textual evidence from the Middle Kingdom that attests to the payment of temple staff is that P. Berlin 10005 = P. Cairo JE 71580. During the New Kingdom, temples played a crucial role in the agricultural production and organization of the state, functioning as powerful economic institutions that oversaw agriculture.

The temple was granted special permission to mine which allowed for economic assets to be acquired within areas such as the Eastern Desert and in Nubia. Within the Eastern Desert the temple would have mined specifically at Wadi Mia and within Nubia at Nauri. The Kanais Decree of Seti I is associated with Seti's temple at Kanais, which protected the gold mines that supplied the gold for the temple at Abydos. Additionally, The Abydos Decree by Seti I at Nauri, carved into the Cliff of Nauri, declares that the temple's property, the gold mines, boats, goods, and workers, belonged to the temple and was then protected. This decree ensures that its resources were unable to be seized by magistrates and fortresses and that the workers were unable to be conscripted for labor or have their animals taken, with a punishment of beatings for those that disobeyed the decree.

The temple also facilitated its trade through its ships, with the temple staff serving as traders who exchanged goods for items such as sesame oil. Furthermore, the temple would have supplied the necessary resources for laborers to tend livestock and supply commodes of cloth and papyri. Although the temple supported workshops and gangs to turn agricultural goods into commodities, its ships ensured economic activities as they were protected.

== Temple and its occult ==
=== Dorothy Louise Eady ===
Dorothy Louise Eady, also known as Omm Sety (16 January 1904 – 21 April 1981), was the keeper of the Temple of Seti I. Eady had fallen down a flight of stairs at the age of three. Following this fall, she had awakened and believed that she was the reincarnation of a priestess who committed suicide when she was discovered to be the former lover of Seti. In 1956, Eady moved to a small village in Abydos and practiced the Ancient Egyptian religion. Following her retirement, she began to give tours through the Temple of Seti.

=== Helicopter hieroglyphs ===
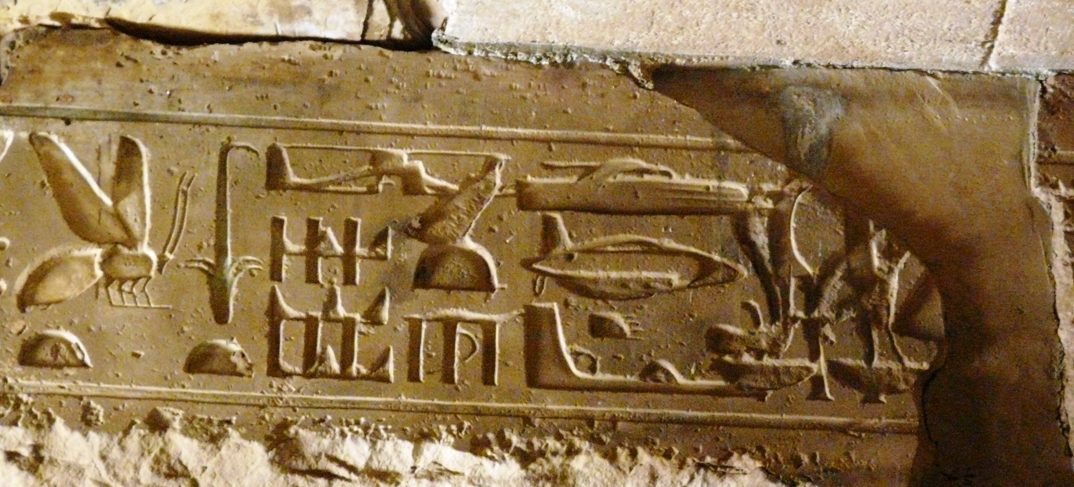
The so-called "helicopter hieroglyphs" - retouched and eroded hieroglyphs in the Temple of Seti I which are purported to represent modern vehicles – a helicopter, a submarine, and a zeppelin or plane.

The "helicopter" image results from the carved stone being re-used over time. The initial carving was made during the reign of Seti I and translates to "He who repulses the nine [enemies of Egypt]." This carving was later filled in with plaster and re-carved during the reign of Ramesses II with the title "He who protects Egypt and overthrows the foreign countries." Over time, the plaster has eroded, leaving both inscriptions partially visible and creating a palimpsest-like effect of overlapping hieroglyphs. These hieroglyphs have been the subject of pyramidologists.

== Bibliography ==
Abuel-Yazid, Mohamed (2019). "Architecture of the slaughterhouse of the Seti Temple at Abydos". In Regulski, Ilona (ed.). Abydos: the sacred land at the Western horizon. British Museum publications on Egypt and Sudan. Leuven Paris Bristol, CT: Peeters. pp. 7–25. ISBN 978-90-429-3799-4.

Baines, J. (1984). Abydos, Temple of Sethos I: Preliminary Report. The Journal of Egyptian Archaeology, 70(1), 13. doi:10.1177/030751338407000103

Baines, John, and Jaromír Málek. Cultural Atlas of Ancient Egypt. 2nd ed. Cultural Atlas Series. New York: Checkmark Books, 2000. 117

Bard, Kathryn A., and Steven Blake Shubert, eds. 1999. "Abydos, Osiris Temple of Seti I" Encyclopedia of the Archaeology of Ancient Egypt. London: Routledge. 114

Brand, Peter J., and Wolfgang Schenkel. The Monuments of Seti I: Epigraphic, Historical, and Art Historical Analysis. Leiden: Brill, 2000. 161

Calverley, Amice M., Myrtle F. Broome. The Temple of King Sethos I at Abydos: by Alan H. Gardiner. Vol. 1-4. London: Egypt Exploration Society (Archaeological Survey); Chicago: Oriental Institute University of Chicago,1933.

Cott, Jonathan, in collaboration with Hanny El Zeini. The Search for Omm Sety. New York: Doubleday & Company, 1987. ISBN 0-385-23746-4.

David, A. Rosalie. Temple Ritual at Abydos. Revised paperback edition. London: The Egypt Exploration Society, 2018. 11, 17-18

David, A. Rosalie . A guide to religious ritual at Abydos. Egyptology series. Warminster, Wilts., England: Aris & Phillips, 1981. p. 1. ISBN 978-0-85668-060-1.

David Frankfurter. Religion in Roman Egypt: Assimilation and Resistance. Princeton University Press, 2020. doi:10.2307/j.ctv10vm2p9.

Eaton, Katherine J. “The Festivals of Osiris and Sokar in the Month of Khoiak: The Evidence from Nineteenth Dynasty Royal Monuments at Abydos.” Studien Zur Altägyptischen Kultur 35 (2006): 75–101. http://www.jstor.org/stable/25157772.

Eberhard Otto. Ancient Egyptian Art: The Cults of Osiris and Amon. New York: Harry N. Abrams, Inc., 1967, pp. 45–60.

Edgerton, William F. “The Nauri Decree of Seti I: A Translation and Analysis of the Legal Portion.” Journal of Near Eastern Studies 6, no. 4 (1947): 219–230.

García, Juan Carlos Moreno. “Temples and Agricultural Labour in Egypt, from the Late New Kingdom to the Saite Period.” In Dynamics of Production in the Ancient Near East, edited by Juan Carlos Moreno García. Oxbow Books, 2016.

Ian Rutherford, "Pilgrimage in Greco-Roman Egypt: New Perspectives on Graffiti from the Memnonion at Abydos," in Ancient Perspectives on Egypt, 1st ed., quoted in Jennifer Westerfeld, "Monastic Graffiti in Context: The Temple of Seti I at Abydos," in Writing and Communication in Early Egyptian Monasticism (Leiden: Brill, 2017)

Kemp, Barry. “New Kingdom Egypt: The Mature State.” In Ancient Egypt, 3rd ed., 1:247–293. Routledge, 2018. 254 doi:10.4324/9781351166485-7.

Kemp, Barry. “The Intellectual Foundations of the Early State.” In Ancient Egypt:, 3rd ed., 1: 60. Routledge, 2018. doi:10.4324/9781351166485-3.

Magdy, Heba. "Representation of the King in the Henu Praise on the Egyptian Temples During the Graeco-Roman Period." Journal of Association of Arab Universities for Tourism and Hospitality 21, no. 2 (2021): 98–112. doi:10.21608/jaauth.2021.88762.1217.

Muhs, Brian 2016. The ancient Egyptian economy 3000-30 BCE. Cambridge: Cambridge University Press. 135

O’Connor, David. “The Temple of Seti I.” In Egypt’s First Pharaohs and the Cult of Osiris, 46-95. New York: Thames & Hudson, 2009.

Verner, Miroslav (June 3, 2013). "Abydos: The Sacred Land". Temple of the World: Sanctuaries, Cults, and Mysteries of Ancient Egypt. American University in Cairo Press. p. 369. doi:10.5743/cairo/9789774165634.001.0001. ISBN 978-1-61797-543-1.

Verner, Miroslav, and Anna Bryson-Gustová, Temple of the World: Sanctuaries, Cults, and Mysteries of Ancient Egypt (Cairo, 2013; online edn, Cairo Scholarship Online, 18 Sept. 2014), 364-372 doi:10.5743/cairo/9789774165634.001.0001, accessed 24 Sept. 2024.

Westerfeld, Jennifer. "Monastic Graffiti in Context: The Temple of Seti I at Abydos." In Writing and Communication in Early Egyptian Monasticism, 196. Leiden: Brill, 2017.

"The Abydos temple "helicopter". Archived from the original on July 28, 2005.

"Helicopter Hieroglyphs Explained". raincool.blogspot.nl. May 23, 2010.
