= Abu Simbel Phoenician graffiti =

Phoenician inscriptions

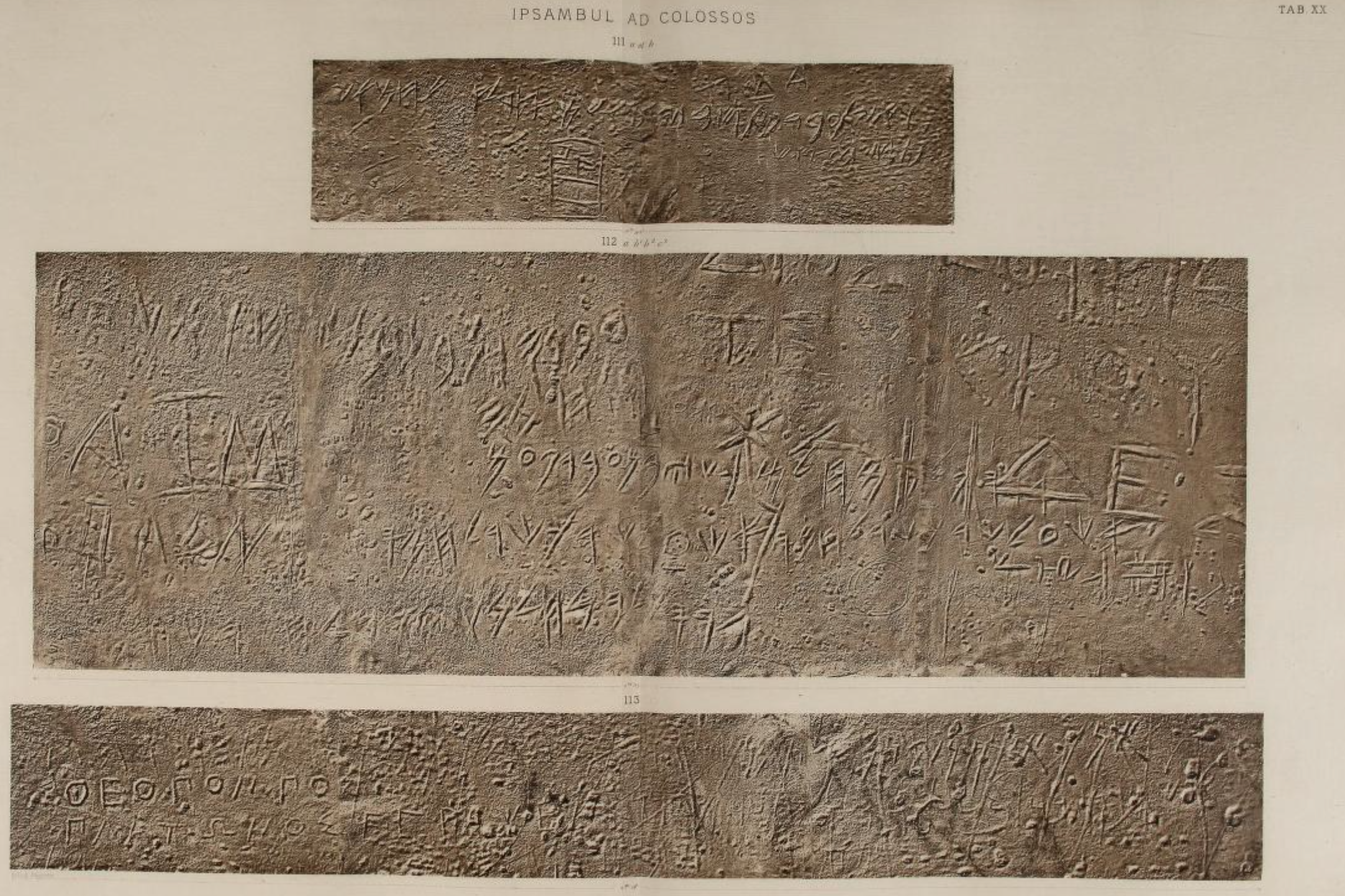
- The Phoenician Graffiti in Abu Simbel from Corpus Inscriptionum Semiticarum CIS I Table XX

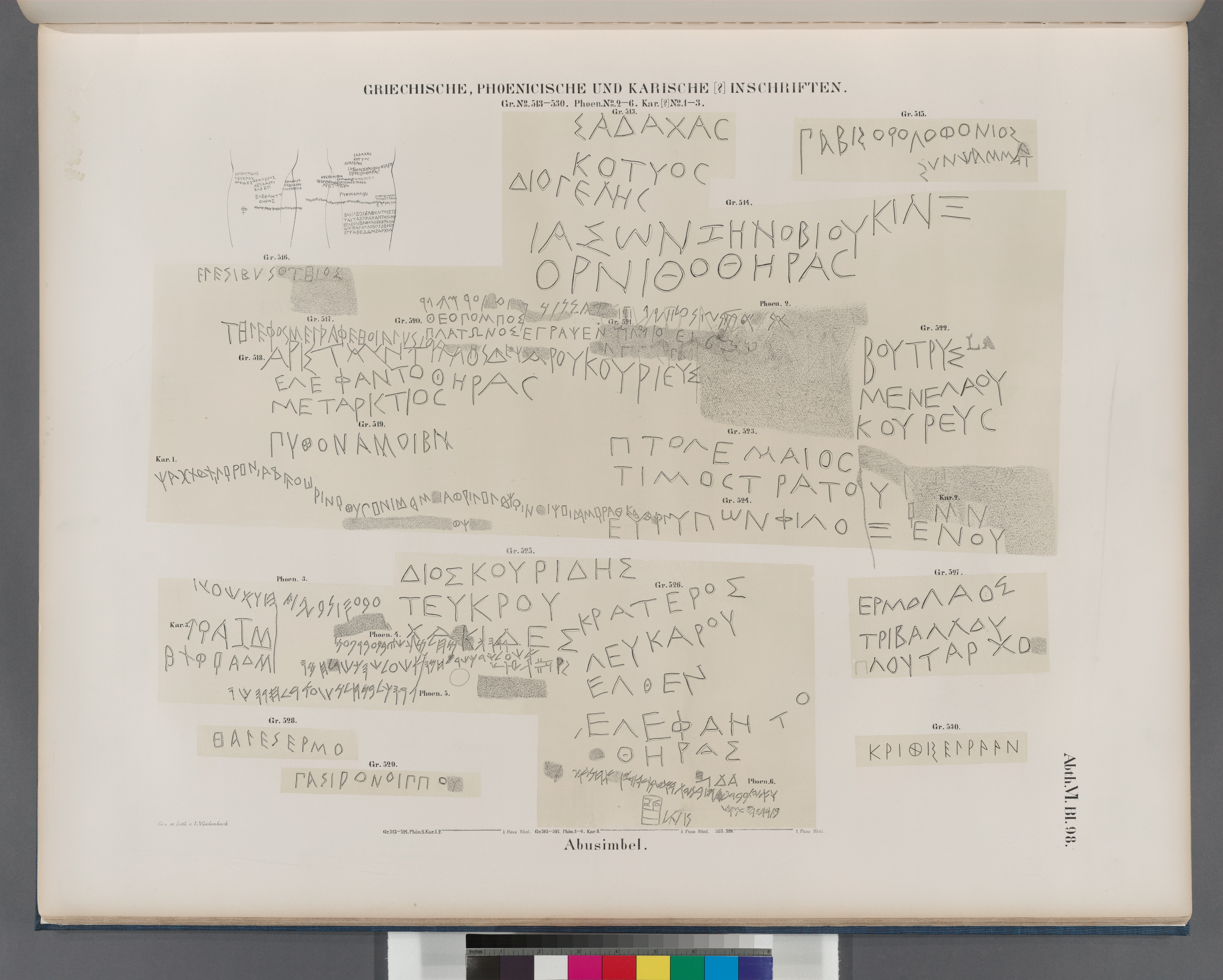
- Greek and Phoenician graffiti recorded in Lepsius' Denkmäler aus Ägypten und Äthiopien
- Type: Graffiti
- Writing: Ionic Greek; Phoenician script
- Created: Saite Period
- Discovered: 1843–1844; Abu Simbel; 22°20′13″N 31°37′32″E
- Discovered by: Richard Lepsius
- Classification: Canaanite and Aramaic inscriptions
- Identification: CIS I 111–113

The Abu Simbel Phoenician graffiti are a number of Phoenician inscriptions found on one of the colossal legs of the temples at Abu Simbel. They have been compared to the Abydos graffiti. They are known as CIS I 111–113.

In 1845, Jean-Jacques Ampère first noticed two of the inscriptions on one of the legs of Ramses II, and sent a copy of them to Louis Félicien de Saulcy. de Saulcy described them as follows:

These inscriptions are designed in Phoenician letters of a large size, but which were altered at a probably very distant time already, by the addition of a few parasitic lines drawn by an ignorant and barbaric hand. Fortunately these alterations of the primitive texts are easy enough to recognize, so that these precious texts can be restored with a sufficient degree of probability.

They had been discovered a year or two earlier by Richard Lepsius, but his work was not published until 1860.

The two pairs of colossal statues of Rameses II contain a variety of graffiti; the best known is the five-line Ionic Greek inscription that mentions both Psamtik I (Greek: βασιλέος... Ψαμάτιχος) and Amasis II (Greek: Ἄμασις), which is on the outside of the left shin of Colossus 1 (furthest left looking at the temple from the outside); directly opposite it on the outside of the right shin of Colossus 2 are four of the Phoenician inscriptions (CIS I 112 a–d). The Greek and Phoenician texts face each other.

== Gallery ==
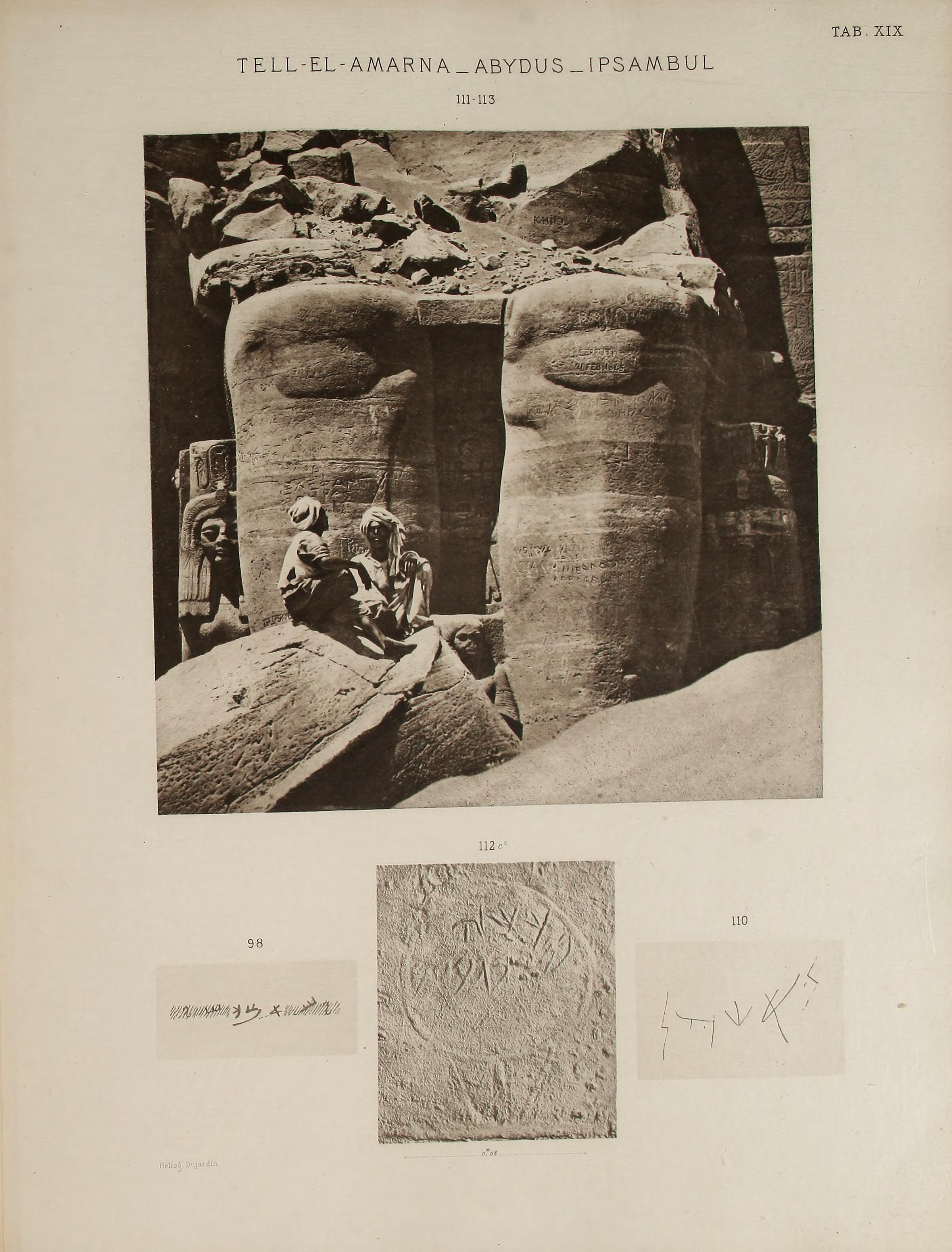
From the Corpus inscriptionum Semiticarum (the bottom shows some of the Abydos graffiti

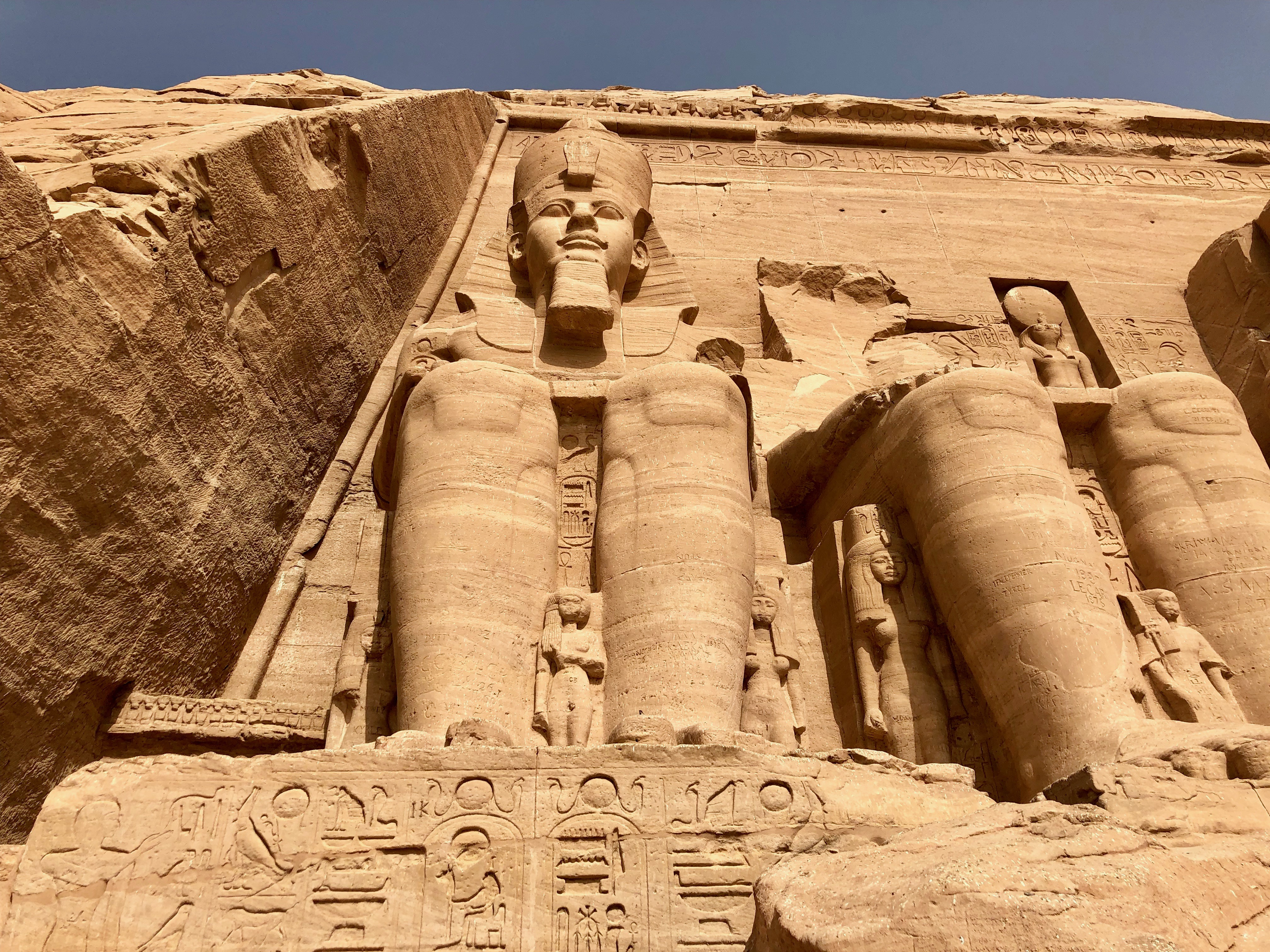
Graffiti on the legs

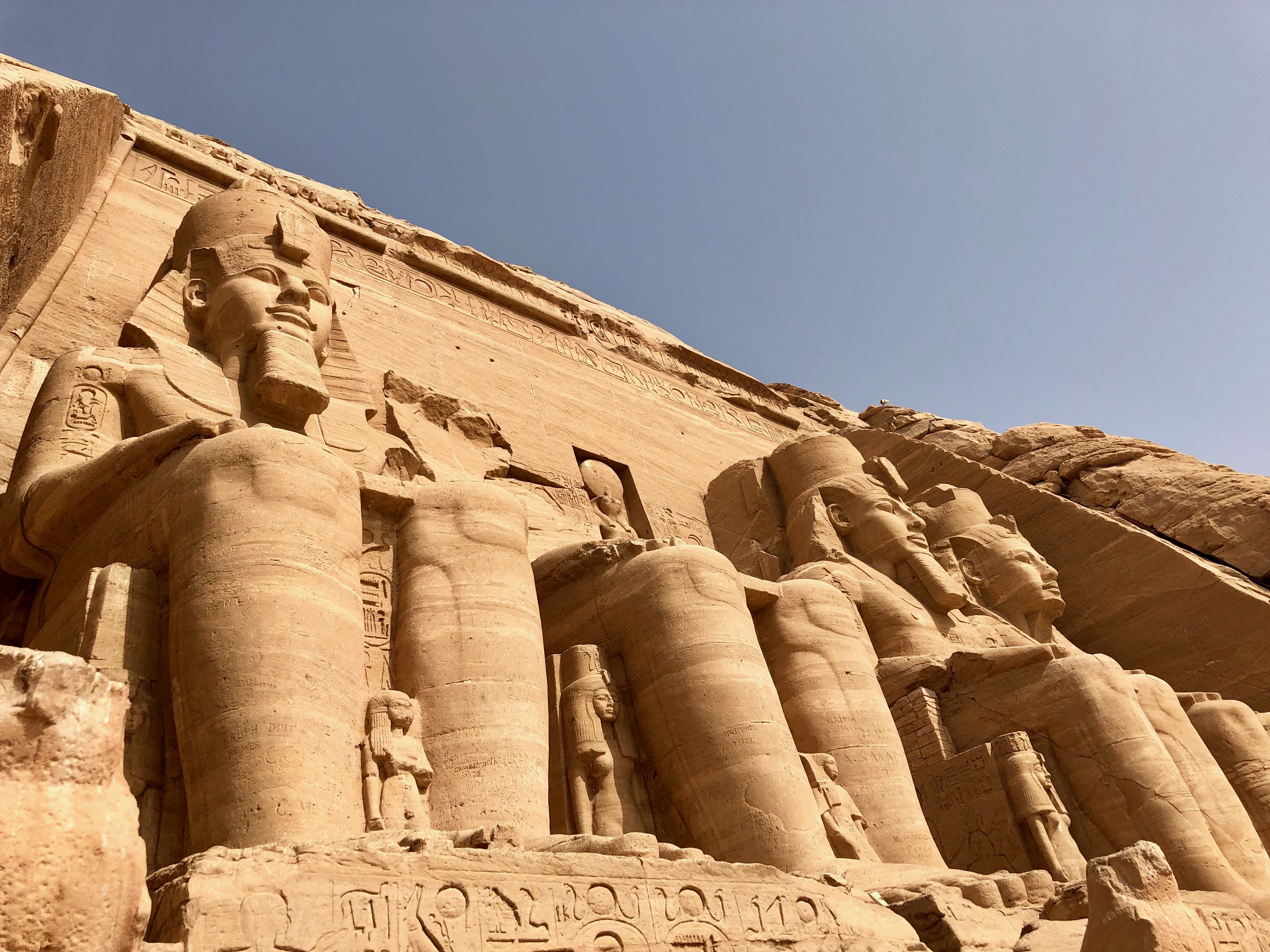
Graffiti from another angle

== Bibliography ==
- Zotenberg, H., "Nouvelles inscriptions phéniciennes d'Égypte." JA sér. 6, t. 11 (1868): 431–50 + 2 pls (also at BNF, including full plate scans)
- Levy, M.A., "Inschriften aus Abydos in Aegypten." Pp. 14–35 + 1 pl. In Phönizische Studien., Breslau: Schletter, 1870
- Derenbourg, J., & Derenbourg, H. (1885). LES INSCRIPTIONS PHÉNICIENNES DU TEMPLE DE SETI À ABYDOS, PUBLIÉES ET TRADUITES D'APRÈS UNE COPIE INÉDITE DE M. SAYCE. Revue D'Assyriologie Et D'archéologie Orientale, 1(3), 81-101
- Murray, M.A., The Osireion at Abydos. Egyptian Research Account, Ninth Year, 1903 . London: B. Quaritch, 1904
- Kornfeld, W., "Neues über die phonikischen und aramäischen Graffiti in den Tempeln vom Abydos." ÖAW, 115 (1978a): 193–204 + 18 pls.
