= El Araba El Madfuna =

- Location in Egypt
- Coordinates: 26°10′30″N 31°54′40″E
- Country: Egypt
- Governorate: Sohag
- Time zone: UTC+2 (EET)
  - Summer (DST): UTC+3 (EEST)

El Araba El Madfuna (Arabic: العربة المدفونة al-ʿarabah al-madfūnah, meaning 'the Buried Wagon', also known as Arabet Abydos) is a town in Egypt. It is located south of Sohag.

== Overview ==
The old name of the town is al-Khirba (Arabic: الخربة), which comes from Coptic: ⲡⲣⲡⲉ, romanized: prpe, lit. 'the temple' and relates to the ruins of the ancient Egyptian town of Abydos, on the site of which it is located. Tourists often visit the site to see the ruins of the temples of Seti I and Ramesses II, although a large number of other ruins and monuments are also located nearby, ranging from Pre-Dynastic through early Christian to Islamic and modern times.
