= Neshmet =

Vessel owned by the ancient Egyptian god Nun

The Neshmet bark was a vessel belonging to the god Nun. The ancient Egyptian deity Osiris was transported in it on the river Nile during the Osiris festival at Abydos. The god's departure from his temple, journey to his tomb, and triumphant return were enacted and drew many spectators who participated in the public parts of the mysteries.

== In myth ==
The myth of the death and resurrection of Osiris kindled hope for eternal life in the hearts of the believers, and since the 6th dynasty they often preferred to be buried near their god at Abydos. Their mummies were taken to the city in decorated funerary boats reminiscent of Osiris' Neshmet bark. Involvement in building a Neshmet bark was an event of some importance and duly recorded among the good deeds in a person's 'autobiographical' mortuary inscriptions. Tomb depictions show the deceased in Neshmet barks, thus Rekhmire's statue is shown in a shrine on the bark with a priest making libations.

== Other divine barks ==
There were other divine barks such as the Hennu bark of Seker, as well as the sun barks of Ra, which included the morning bark, mandjet, and the evening bark, mesktet.
