= Hennu =

Egyptian symbol

Image of the Hennu boat

In Egyptian mythology, the hennu boat or Sokar barque (also henu, Manuel de Codage transliteration: Hnw) was a symbol of the god Seker of Memphis. Depending on the era or the prevailing dynasty of Egypt, the hennu boat sailed toward either dawn or dusk.

G10
ḥnw
in hieroglyphs

In the Pyramid Texts of Unas (PT 214, 138c) one of the steps the deceased had to take, after leaving his property to his son, after purifying himself, etc. was: You will descend on ropes of bronze, in the arms of Horus as his name is "Being in the Hennu barque."

On the holiday of the god Seker, a stone—possibly a representation of the god—was put on the Hennu barque and pulled with a sled over the fields, while people followed it wearing garlands of onions. A harpist's song from the tomb of Djehutimes (TT 32) describes the practice as follows: [He] pulled [So]kar by placing the Hennu barque on its sled, going around the walls with his following.

At times the Hennu barque was identified with Seker himself, as in pKairo CG 51189 (pYuya) where it is stated: I have appeared as Hennu. which is followed two lines below by this passage: I have appeared as Sokar.

== Other divine barks ==
- The Neshmet
- The sun barks of Re: the morning bark, mandjet, and the evening bark, mesktet.
