= Osireion =

Cenotaph of Seti I at Abydos, Egypt

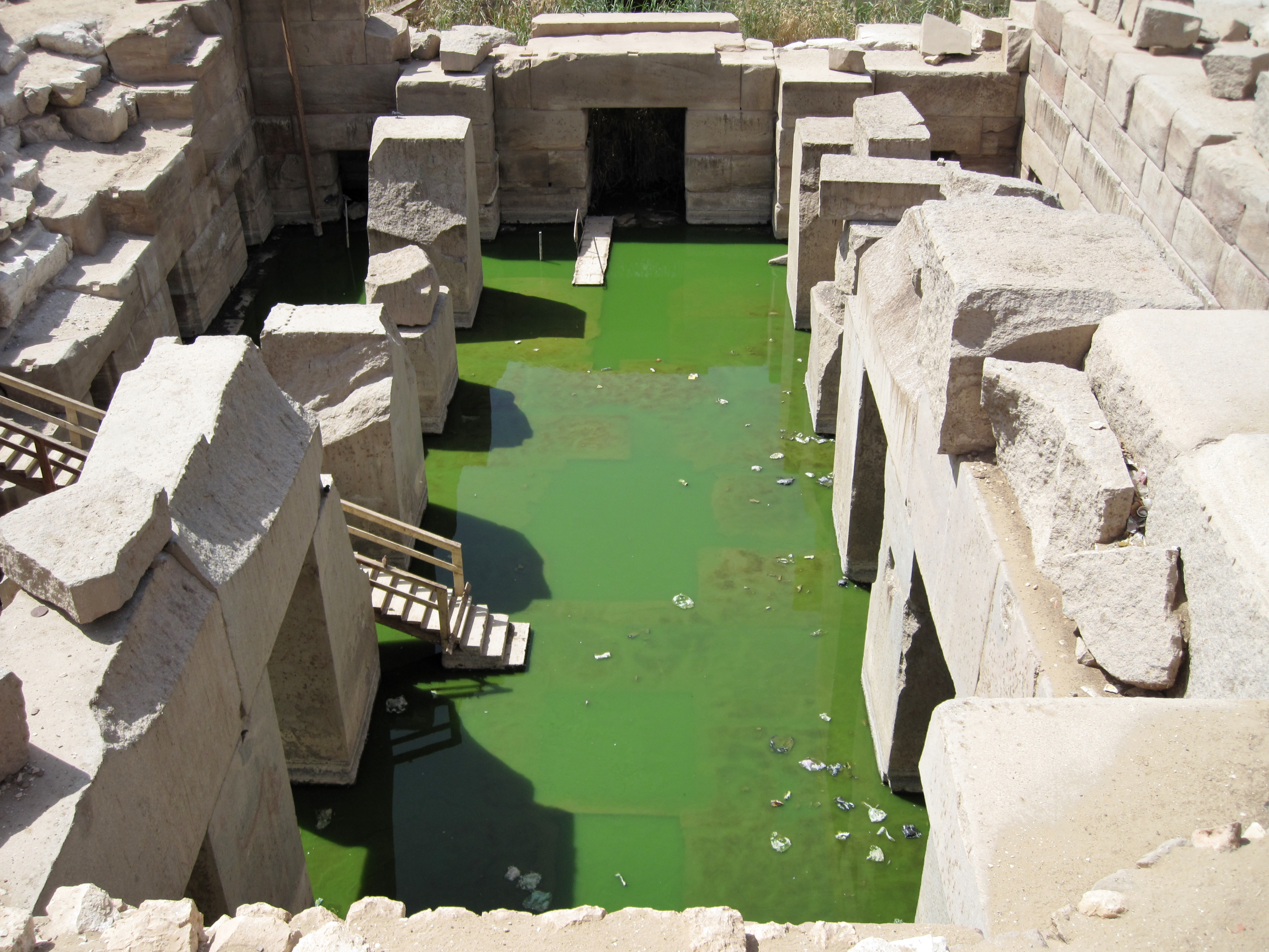
- The Osireion at the rear of the temple of Seti I at Abydos

- Location within Egypt
- 26.1841°N 31.9184°E
- Type: Cenotaph
- Location: Abydos, Egypt

History
- Built: 13th century BCE; 19th dynasty of Egypt
- Built by: Seti I

The Osireion (or Osirion) is believed to be the cenotaph of Seti I, located to the rear of the Temple of Seti I at Abydos, Egypt. The temple was built in the 13th century BC and many researchers believe the Osireion dates from the same period. Seti I ruled from c. 1294 BCE to c. 1279 BCE.

== Layout and construction ==
The Osireion is part of the Temple of Seti I's complex. It may have been built to resemble the tombs in the Valley of the Kings. It is located centrally behind the main part of the Temple of Seti I along an east west axis. Most of its structure would have been subterranean. It was built at a considerably lower level than the foundations of the Temple of Seti I. However, most of the roof has been lost. There is an entrance tunnel that runs along a north south axis behind the Osireion's central hall. It is 69 metres (226 ft) long and stone lined.

The central hall is constructed with very large stone blocks; limestone interior with sandstone facing. The roof would have been formed of large granite beams. The hall contains a stone-paved 'island' in the centre surrounded by a channel of water, the depth of which is yet to be determined. The water is at least 10.4 metres (34 ft) deep and connects to an underground water source. There are 17 small chambers in the hall's walls, and behind the wall opposite the entrance there is a 'sarcophagus chamber'.

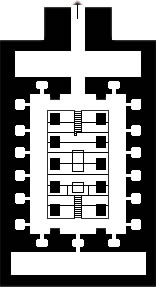
Plan of the central hall of the Osireion. Showing entrance from tunnel at the top and sarcophagus chamber at the bottom.

== Research ==
=== Historical accounts ===
Strabo visited the Osireion in the first century BCE and gave a description of the site as it appeared in his time:

Above this city [Ptolemaïs] lies Abydus, where is the Memnonium, a royal building, which is a remarkable structure built of solid stone, and of the same workmanship as that which I ascribed to the Labyrinth, though not multiplex; and also a fountain which lies at a great depth, so that one descends to it down vaulted galleries made of monoliths of surprising size and workmanship.

The subterranean water basin at the Osireion was consequently named "Strabo's Well" by modern excavators. Strabo then theorises that the Osireion might have been constructed by Ismandes, or Mandes, (Note: Ismandes, Mandes, or Amenemhet III was a pharaoh of the 12th dynasty who reigned in the 19th and 18th centuries BCE.) the same purported builder as with the Labyrinth at Hawara:

But if, as they say, Memnon is called Ismandes by the Egyptians, the Labyrinth might be a Memnonium, and the work of the same person who constructed those at Abydos and at Thebes; for in those places, it is said, are some Memnonia.

Strabo's uncertainty about the origins of the structure highly suggests that these were already unknown by the time of his visit.

=== Rediscovery ===
The Osireion was rediscovered by archaeologists Flinders Petrie and Margaret Murray, who were excavating the site in 1902–1903.

=== Construction date ===
Due to the depth of the building, its atypical architectural style and its unclear role in religious practice, it has been suggested that the Osirion may be a much older structure that was incorporated into the Temple of Seti I. However, the suggestion is generally rejected by archaeologists.

The Egypt Exploration Society (EES) excavations uncovered an ancient mark; “Menmaatre [Seti I] is Beneficial to Osiris”. It is believed to be the ancient name given to the subterranean structure. The EES came to the conclusion that it was built during the reign of Seti I, as detailed in its report published in 1933.

In his 1998 dissertation on Seti I, P.J. Brand (2000), emphasised the numerous cartouches of Seti I agreed with the EES, it "... can be dated confidently to Seti's reign". (Note: Although it is certainly likely that a pharaoh whose name is excribed on a building had ordered its erection, perhaps replacing an earlier building, it was also a common practice of Egyptian pharaohs to have their own names written over previous pharaohs' names. The practice was even more likely if the pharaoh had directed a (possibly minor) renovation to a pre-existing structure.)

=== Purpose ===
Since the water is connected to an underground water source, it could have been used as a well.

Graffiti by Egyptian priests of Dynasties XXI–XXII found in the long entrance passage, the vaulted galleries mentioned by Strabo, hint at its function: “The hidden / secret place of the Underworld / Duat of Menmaatre [Seti I]” and more specifically and revealing as the “Birth House of Isis”.

== See also ==
- 19th dynasty of Egypt
- List of megalithic sites
