= Amenemhat =

i mn n m HAt t
Amenemhat
in hieroglyphs

Amenemḥat or Amenemhēt, hellenized as Ammenémēs /əˈmɛnɪmiːz/ (Eusebius: Ἀμμενέμης) or as Ammanémēs /əˈmænɪmiːz/ (Africanus: Ἀμμανέμης), is an Ancient Egyptian name meaning "Amun is at the forefront". Amenemhat was the name of a number of kings, princes and administration officials throughout ancient Egyptian history.

== Kings ==
- Amenemhat I (20th century BC), the first ruler of the 12th dynasty
- Amenemhat II (early 19th century BC), the third pharaoh of the 12th dynasty
- Amenemhat III (19th–18th century BC), pharaoh during the 12th dynasty
- Amenemhat IV (18th–17th century BC), the penultimate pharaoh of the 12th dynasty
- Amenemhat Sobekhotep I (reigned c. 1803–1800 BC), first king of the 13th dynasty
- Amenemhat Senbef (reigned c. 1800–1796 BC), second king of the 13th dynasty
- Sekhemkare Amenemhat V (fl. early 18th century BC), Egyptian king during the 13th dynasty
- Ameny Antef Amenemhat VI (fl. mid-18th century BC), Egyptian king during the 13th dynasty
- Sedjefakare Kay Amenemhat VII (fl. mid-18th century BC), Egyptian king during the 13th dynasty

== Princes ==
- Amenemhatankh (fl. early 19th century BC), prince of the 12th dynasty and a son of Amenemhat II
- Amenemhat (son of Thutmose III) (fl. mid-15th century BC), prince of the 18th dynasty of Egypt and a son of Pharaoh Thutmose III
- Amenemhat (son of Thutmose IV) (fl. early 14th century BC), prince during the 18th dynasty of Egypt and the son of Pharaoh Thutmose IV

== Officials ==
- Amenemhat (nomarch, 16th nome) (fl. mid-20th century BC), nomarch of the 16th nome during the 12th dynasty
- Amenemhat (High Priest of Amun) (fl. late 15th century BC), High Priest of Amun during the reign of Amenhotep II
- Amenemhat (chief of Teh-khet), chief of Teh-khet, Nubian local governor in office under Hatshepsut and Thutmoses III

== Other ==
- Amen-em-hat, a wealthy man living near Luxor ca. 320 BCE, who commissioned the Book of the Dead of Amen-em-hat
- 5010 Amenemhêt, main-belt asteroid
