= Sekhemrekhutawy =

Sekhemre Khutawy in hieroglyphs
< ra sxm x D43 N19 >
Throne Name Sekhemrekhutawy
Sḫm-Rˁ-ḫwj-t3wj
Mighty Re, he who protects the Two Lands

Sekhemrekhutawy (also Sekhemre Khutawy) is an Ancient Egyptian name meaning "Mighty Re, he who protects the Two Lands". Sekhemrekhutawy was the name of three Egyptian pharaohs during the Second Intermediate period:

- Sekhemrekhutawy Sobekhotep was either the founder of the 13th Dynasty or its twentieth ruler. He may have been a son of Amenemhat IV and reigned for a short while c. 1800 BC.
- Sekhemrekhutawy Khabaw was either the third of the sixteenth ruler of the 13th Dynasty. He may have reigned for 3 years c. 1775 BC.
- Sekhemrekhutawy Pantjeny was a local ruler of Abydos some time between 1650 BC and 1600 BC. He either belongs to the Abydos Dynasty or to the 16th Dynasty.
