= Sekhemkare =

Egyptian pharaoh

Amenemhat V
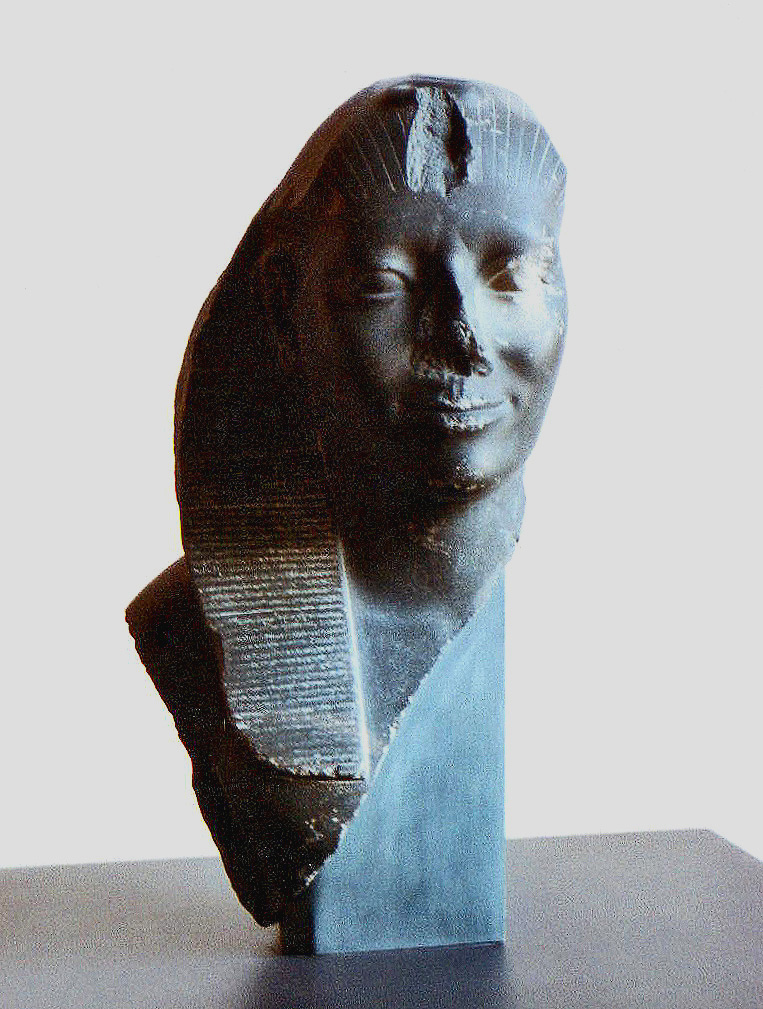
- Statue of Amenemhat V, from Elephantine.

Pharaoh
- Reign: 1796 – 1793 BC (Ryholt); 1746 – 1743 BC (Franke)
- Predecessor: Nerikare (Ryholt); Pantjeny (Beckerath)
- Successor: Ameny Qemau (Ryholt); Sehotepibre (Beckerath)
Royal titulary
Prenomen
Sekhemkare
Sḫm-k3-Rˁ
Mighty is the Ka of Ra
M23 t L2 t < N5 s S42 D28 >
Nomen
Amenemhat
Jmn m ḥ3.t
Amun is in front
G39 N5 < i mn n m HAt t >
Turin canon:
Amenemhat
Jmn m ḥ3.t
Amun is in front
G39 N5 < i mn n m HAt t Z1 G7 >
- Children: possibly Ameny Qemau
- Dynasty: 13th Dynasty

See Amenemhat, for other individuals with this name.

Sekhemkare Amenemhat V was an Egyptian pharaoh of the early 13th Dynasty during the Second Intermediate Period.

The identity of Amenemhat V is debated by a minority of Egyptologists, as he could be the same person as Sekhemkare Amenemhat Sonbef, the second ruler of the 13th Dynasty. According to Egyptologists Kim Ryholt and Darrell Baker, he was the 4th king of the dynasty, reigning from 1796 BC until 1793 BC.

== Attestations ==
=== Elephantine, Statue ===
Amenemhat V is attested by a single artefact contemporaneous with his lifetime, a statue of him from Elephantine, originally set up in the Temple of Satet and inscribed with the following dedication:

The good god, lord of the two lands, lord of the ceremonies, the king of Upper and Lower Egypt Sekhemkare, the son of Ra Amenemhat, beloved of Satet, lady of Elephantine, may he live for ever.

The head and arms of the statue were discovered in the 19th century in the ruins of a temple built to honor a nomarch named Heqaib and are in Kunsthistorisches Museum Inv. 37 in Vienna. The body of the statue bearing the above inscription was discovered in the year 1932 and is now in the Aswan Museum.

=== Lahun, Legal document ===
At Lahun, the name "Sekhemkare" is attested from a legal document, dating to year 3, some months and days.

=== Non-Contemporary Attestations ===
==== Turin King List ====
The Turin King List 7:07 mentions "The Dual King Amenemhat(ra) ... 3 years". This entry has been linked to Amenemhat V, if Amenemhat V and Amenemhat Senebef are two different rulers. Another possibility is Ameny.

== Theories ==
There is a debate between Egyptologists as whether Sekhemkare Amenemhat V is the same king as Sekhemkare Sonbef, whom Kim Ryholt, Jürgen von Beckerath and Darrell Baker see as the 2nd ruler of the 13th Dynasty. Indeed, Sonbef called himself "Amenemhat Sonbef", which Ryholt argues must be understood as "Amenemhat [Sa] Sonbef", The Son of Amenemhat Sonbef, i.e. Sonbef would be the son of Amenemhat IV. In particular, they see Sonbef and Amenemhat V as two different rulers. Ryholt and Baker further posit that Sonbef's and Amenemhat's rules were separated by the ephemeral reign of Nerikare, while von Beckerath believes it was Sekhemre Khutawy Pantjeny who reigned between the two. At the opposite Detlef Franke and Stephen Quirke believe that the "Amenemhat" in Sonbef's title is part of his name and identifies him as Amenemhat V, thus seeing the two kings as one and the same person. In other terms, Franke and others regard "Amenemhat Sonbef" as a double name. Indeed, double naming was common in Egypt and especially in the late 12th and 13th Dynasty.

== See also ==
- List of Pharaohs

Preceded by Nerikare	Pharaoh of Egypt; Thirteenth Dynasty	Succeeded by Ameny Qemau
