= Iu-miteru =

Iu-miteru in hieroglyphs
N18 mi i t&r
Iu-miteru
iw-mitrw
Island of Miteru, island of the river

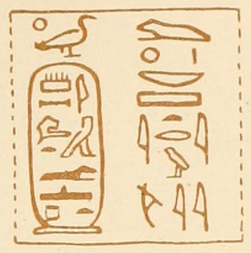
Drawing of a seal reading "The son of Ra, Sobekhotep Amenemhat, beloved of Sobek-Ra, Lord of Iu-miteru".

Iu-miteru (iw-mitrw/jw-mjtrw - the island in the river) was an ancient Egyptian town in the fourth Upper Egyptian nome, near Gebelein. The town is often mentioned in Ancient Egyptian texts and was the place for a temple for Sobek. From an inscription found at the Wadi Hammamat it seems certain that the place was at the Southern border of the Fourth Upper Egyptian nome. Modern identification of the location of Iu-Miteru remains uncertain. The ruins of a temple of Sobek were discovered in Naga' Awlad Dahmash (Rizeiqat), which could thus be the ancient Iu-miteru.

== Old Kingdom ==
In the 6th Dynasty, a letter mentions the estate.

== Second Intermediate Period ==
In the Second Intermediate Period, the Temple of Sobek at Iumiteru meaning Island on the River, saw attention from Sobekhotep Amenemhat.

At the temple, there was a ab-priest of Iumiteru (wꜥb n Jw-mjtrw). Two people are known with this title Resseneb and sn(⸗j)-rs.

Another title known from the site is Man of Iumutru (s n jw-mjtrw) named Neferhotep.

== Bibliogrophy ==
- Newberry, Percy E. (1908). Scarabs: An Introduction to the Study of Egyptian Seals and Signet Rings. London: Archibald Constable. Particularly relevant to the scarab bearing the name of Sobekhotep Amenemhat and the Lord of Iu-miteru.
- Roccati, Alessandro (1968). "Una lettera inedita dell'Antico Regno". Journal of Egyptian Archaeology, 54, p. 17. Discusses an Old Kingdom letter mentioning an estate associated with Iu-miteru.
- Gomaa, Farouk (1986). Besiedlung Ägyptens im Mittleren Reich. Wiesbaden: Reichert. See volume I, pp. 122–125, for the settlement and identification of Iu-miteru.
- Marochetti, Elisa Fiore (2009). The Reliefs of the Chapel of Nebhepetra Mentuhotep at Gebelein. Relevant to the religious and archaeological context of Gebelein.
- Ejsmond, Wojciech (2017). "The Necropolis of Er-Rizeiqat". Ägypten und Levante / Egypt and the Levant, 27, pp. 241–248. Relevant to the archaeological remains in the area of the proposed identification of Iu-miteru.
