= Khenmes =

High official in ancient Egypt

- Vizier of Egypt
- Dynasty: Thirteenth Dynasty
- Spouse: Senebtisy
- Mother: Sat-Khenty-Khety

Khenmes was an Egyptian vizier during the early 13th Dynasty, in the late Middle Kingdom. One monument associates him with king Sekhemkare. He is believed to have resided in Itjtawy in Lower Egypt.

== Biography ==
=== Family ===
The mother of the vizier was a certain woman called Sat-khenty-khety. She is mentioned on his monuments. The name of one of his sons in a rock inscription is not well preserved but his title royal sealer implies that he was a high official at the royal court

=== Career ===
==== Vizier ====
We only have attestations from the time when he was a vizier (ṯꜣtj). The vizier was the most important official after the king.

His title string has two variations:

- jmj-rꜣ njwt; ṯꜣtj; jmj-rꜣ ḥwt-wrt 6 (BM EA 75196)
- jrj-pꜥt; ḥꜣtj-ꜥ; jmj-rꜣ njwt; ṯꜣtj (de Morgan, Cat. I, 26 (186 (right)))

== Attestations ==
Khenmes is known for sure only from two sources. A fragment of a statue in the British Museum (EA75196). Khenmes is also attested in a rock inscription found Aswan.

BM EA75196 | A granodiorite statue of man seated on the ground belonging to Khenmes, including the royal name of king Sekhemkare.

de Morgan, Cat. I, 26 186 | At the Aswan-Philae road a rock inscription by vizier Khenmes. It mentions his mother and two children. His wife may be Senebtify.

=== Weaker attestations ===
Aswan 1314 (weak) | At Elephantine, a stela which may relate to his family. Family members seems different, Ameny not mentioned.

Khartoum 2650 (weak) | At Semna, a table belonging to Ameny, who may have been the son of Khenmes. However, the name Ameny was common and this may refer to a different person.

P. Ramesseum 18 (weak) | At the Ramesseum, a hieratic text which mentions a reporter named Khenmes. Only the name is similar with a different title.
