= Bust of Amenemhat V =

Ancient Egyptian bust

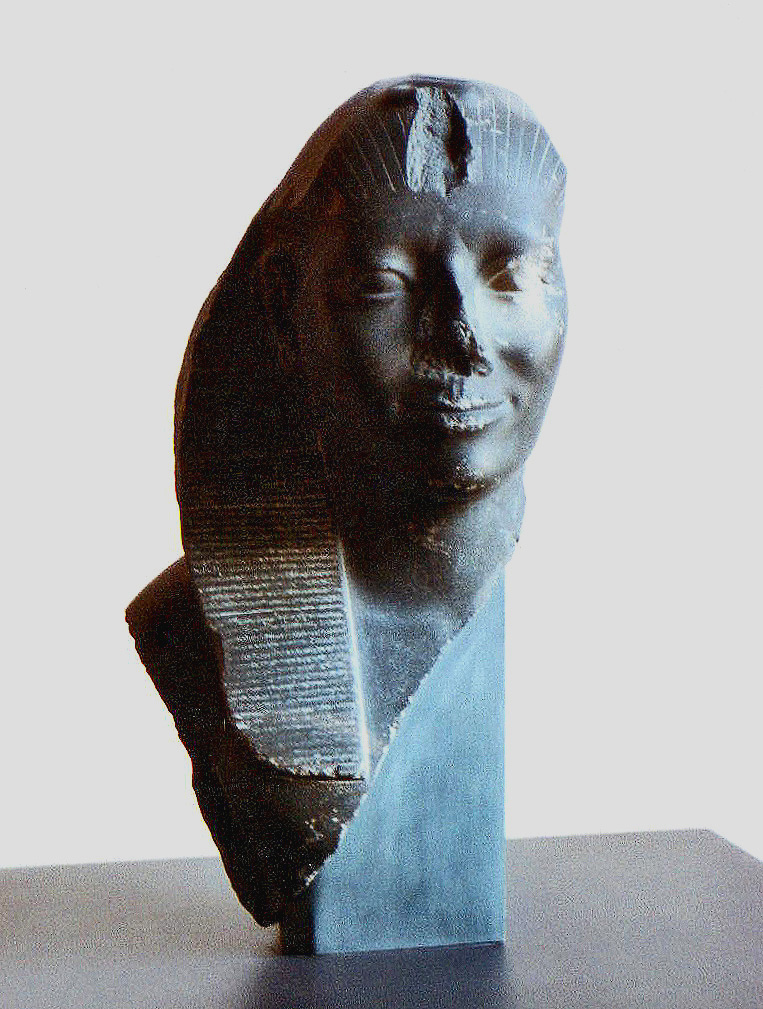
Bust of Amenemhat V

The Bust of Amenemhat V is a sculpture showing the head of the ancient Egyptian king Amenemhat V, who ruled at the beginning of the Thirteenth Dynasty. One of the major art works of this period, it is today in the Kunsthistorisches Museum in Vienna with the inventory number ÄS 37.

The bust is 35 cm (14 in) high and was once part of a lifesize statue. The sculpture is made of schist and does not bear any inscription. Therefore, it was for a long time not possible to date this head. It was often assumed that it belongs to the Late Period or even to the Ptolemaic Period. In 1985 were published the objects found in the sanctuary of Heqaib on Elephantine. These were mainly stelae and statues. One of the statues belonged to Thirteenth Dynasty king Sekhemkare Amenemhat V, that was discovered in November 1932. The statue was found headless. Already three years later after the full publication of the finds, the Egyptologist Biri Fay published an article demonstrating that the bust in Vienna and the statue of Amenemhat V, found on Elephantine, belong together.

The bust was most likely bought in 1821 and came shortly after to Vienna. The head is first mentioned in an old museum inventory dating back to 1824 and is there identified as female bust. It belonged to the pieces of the Antiken-Cabinet, that was founded by empress Maria Theresia in 1765. The statue was found in the sanctuary of Heqaib, but once adorned the nearby local temple of Satet. The statue was found heavily smashed, the back and large portions of the arms are missing. The throne bears two inscriptions next to the legs of the king, on the front and on the top of the throne, naming the king Sekhemkare, Amenemhat. He is called beloved of Satet, mistress of Elephantine. The king is shown with a nemes headdress. On the head there is an uraeus, that is partly destroyed. A remarkable feature of the face is the smile, while most statues of the reigns before show a rather unsmiley face expression. However, the style of the head follows the style of the royal sculpture under Amenemhat III with a tendency for realism.
