= Temple of Satet =

Ancient Egyptian temple

Coordinates: 24.0844°N 32.8872°E

Temple of Satet in hieroglyphs
s V13 t F29 pr
Pr-Sṯt
Per-Setjet

The Temple of Satet or Satis was an ancient Egyptian temple dedicated to the goddess Satet, a personification of the Nile inundation. The temple was located on the Nile Valley island of Elephantine, Egypt. Founded during the late Predynastic Period around 3200 BC, it was enlarged and renovated several times from the Early Dynastic Period onwards over the next 3000 years until the Ptolemaic Period. The temple of Satet is the best example of an ancient Egyptian temple whose construction is attested over the entire pharaonic period.

== Earliest times to First Intermediate Period ==
The earliest temple was built c. 3200 BC and was little more than a cultic niche lodged between three large natural granite boulders. This earliest temple was very small, housing a sanctuary of about 2 m × 2 m (6.6 ft × 6.6 ft) that was made of mud bricks. In front of the sanctuary, on the East side, there were some mud brick houses. The temple was enlarged during the 1st and 2nd Dynasties and rebuilt during the Third Dynasty, but its old plan was kept. On the South side outside the niche between the boulders, some granaries were added. The temple was again rebuilt during the Fifth Dynasty, possibly under Nyuserre Ini, at which point the sanctuary located at the center of the rock niche was enlarged. In front of it was now a forecourt, about 5 m × 5 m (16 ft × 16 ft) in size, which was surrounded by an open walkway. A deposit of votive offerings was discovered under the floor of the sanctuary. These were dedicated to the goddess over a few hundred years during the course of the Old Kingdom by both royal and private individuals and comprised mainly small faience figures, showing humans and animals. Beyond that, on the South side, granaries and a mud brick administrative building were located.

Pepi I, the second pharaoh of the Sixth Dynasty ordered once more a rebuilding of the temple. The old plan was kept, but the brick walls were enlarged and a granite sanctuary for the goddess's statue was added. By this time, the god Khnum was also worshipped in the temple. In his fifth year of reign, Pepi's successor Merenre Nemtyemsaf I came to Elephantine to receive the submission of Nubian chieftains. On that occasion he might have visited the temple to renew the shrine erected by his father.

== Middle Kingdom ==
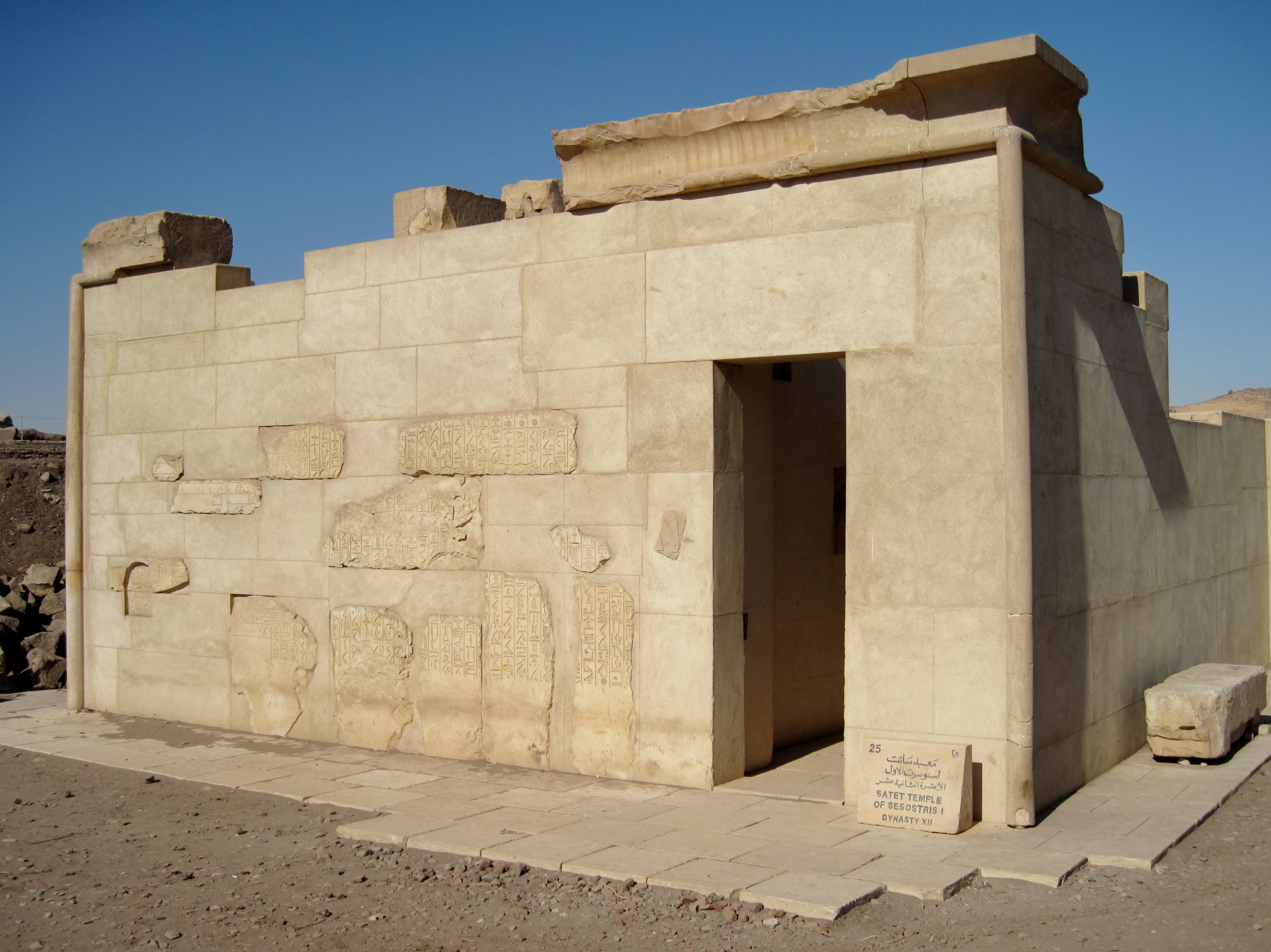
Modern reconstruction of the temple of Senusret I.

Towards the end of the First Intermediate Period, in the early Eleventh Dynasty, the Theban king Intef III totally renovated the temple. The central chapel was left at its original place between the three natural boulders. The hall which stood in front of the chapel was paved and decorated with limestone slabs for the first time.

Shortly after, Mentuhotep II did further modifications in the temple, building an entirely new sanctuary. He added new inscriptions and, on the North side, a columned courtyard and a lake part of an installation to celebrate the Nile flood, which the Ancient Egyptians believed, started in Elephantine. The temple was then still mainly made out of mudbricks, with only the most important walls lined with decorated limestone blocks.

Less than 100 years later, early in the subsequent dynasty, pharaoh Senusret I replaced Mentuhotep's structure with a totally new temple and courtyard. While all earlier building follow the same layout and exclusively used mudbricks, the new temple was entirely made in limestone. By this time, the level of the temple was above the rock niche of the Old Kingdom. However, the main sanctuary was built directly over the old one, therefore keeping the old tradition. The temple of Senusret I was fully decorated, but only few fragments of the decoration survived, these include the remains of a long inscription of the king. At the same time, the god Khnum was given his own separate temple on the island. The temple of Satet was originally adorned with many statues, among which is a statue of the Thirteenth Dynasty king Amenemhat V that bears a dedication to the goddess:

The good god, lord of the two lands, lord of the ceremonies, the king of Upper and Lower Egypt Sekhemkare, the son of Ra Amenemhat, beloved of Satet, lady of Elephantine, may he live for ever.

Another statue once adorning the temple belongs to king Senusret III. There is also a dyad of king Sobekemsaf I adoring the goddess that was certainly once in the temple. Indeed, even though these statues were all discovered in the nearby sanctuary of the local saint Heqaib, according to their inscriptions they must originally have been in the temple of Satet.

== New Kingdom and later times ==
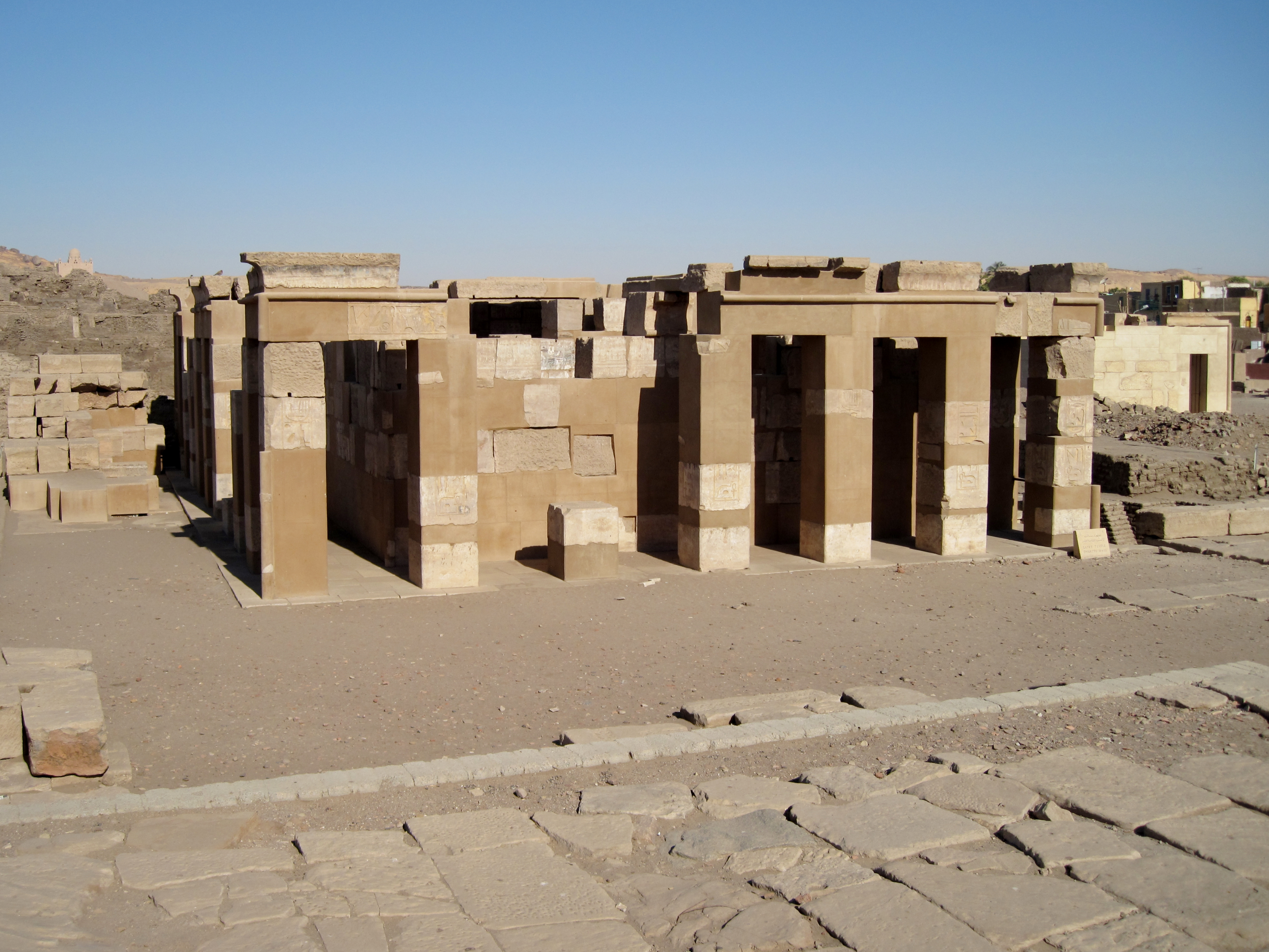
Modern reconstruction of the 18th Dynasty temple of Satet.

During the New Kingdom period, the temple was built anew under queen Hatshepsut (1507–1458 BC) in the early 18th Dynasty and further enlarged by her successor, Thutmose III. The temple was then a solid rectangular building, some 15.9 m × 9.52 m (52.2 ft × 31.2 ft) in size, completely surrounded by a 20.10 m × 13.52 m (65.9 ft × 44.4 ft) walkway that had 7 × 10 pillars on the outside. The sanctuary of the new temple was placed directly over the sanctuary of the older periods. Evidently the New Kingdom temple kept the old tradition of the sanctuary's place. There are indications for further construction work during the 26th Dynasty (664–525 BC), but very little of that temple has survived. There are several blocks of a gateway that was once about 7.35 m (24.1 ft) high, that led to a brick enclosure wall, the latter perhaps once belonging to the temple. Shortly before the Persian conquest of Egypt, pharaoh Amasis II (570–526 BC) added a colonnade or kiosk to the temple. Six limestone columns and screen walls were found.

A totally new temple was built under Ptolemy VI (180–145 BC), during the Ptolemaic Kingdom. It was again a rectangular building. At the back on the West side, there was the main sanctuary, in front of it there was a broad hall and in front of the latter two further smaller halls, with smaller rooms leading from them on the short sides. In front of the new temple was erected a free standing kiosk. The sanctuary was no longer built over the place of the Old Kingdom sanctuary. It seems that the location and its importance were forgotten. Ptolemy VIII (182–116 BC) finally added a pronaos to the temple with two by four columns.

== Nilometer ==
One of the two and the best preserved nilometer is associated with the Temple of Satet.

== See also ==
- List of ancient Egyptian sites, including sites of temples
