= Nerikare =

Egyptian pharaoh

- Nerkare, [Kheper?]kare, Djefakare
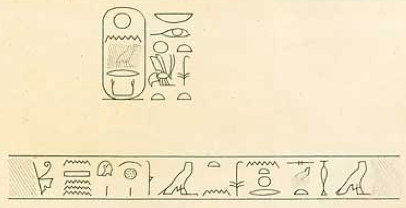
- Drawing of the text on the stele of Nerikare discovered in Thebes by Karl Richard Lepsius, now lost.

Pharaoh
- Reign: 1796 BC
- Predecessor: Sonbef (Ryholt), Sehetepkare Intef (von Beckerath)
- Successor: Amenemhat V (Ryholt), Hotepkare (von Beckerath)
Royal titulary
Prenomen
Nerikare
Nry-k3-Rˁ
M23 t L2 t < N5 n G14 r D28 >
Nomen
Uncertain, possibly "Sobek"
- Dynasty: 13th Dynasty

Nerikare was an Egyptian pharaoh of the 13th Dynasty during the Second Intermediate Period.

According to the Egyptologists Kim Ryholt and Darrell Baker, he was the third king of the dynasty, reigning for a short time in 1796 BC. Alternatively Jürgen von Beckerath sees Nerikare as the twenty-third king of the 13th Dynasty, reigning after Sehetepkare Intef.

== Attestations ==
Nerikare is known primarily from a single stele dated to year 1 of his reign. The stele was published in 1897 but is now lost.

In addition, the prenomen of a king who could be Nerikare is attested on a Nile record from Semna, near the second cataract of the Nile in Nubia. The record is dated to the first regnal year of this king, whose name was read as "Djefakare" by egyptologists F. Hintze and W. F. Reineke. Kim Ryholt however notes that the prenomen was misread by the discoverers of the record with Gardiner's sign G14 nry, representing a vulture, mistaken for the sign G42 representing a duck and reading ḏf3. Thus, Ryholt and others, such as Darrell Baker, now reads the name as "Nerikare".

== Chronological position ==
Ryholt points out that known Nile records, which are similar to the one he attributes to Nerikare, all date to the time period from the late 12th to early 13th dynasties. He thus concludes that Nerikare too must have been a king of this time period, and since "Nerikare" does not appear on the Turin canon, Ryholt proposes that he was mentioned in the wsf lacuna affecting the third king of the dynasty in the Turin canon (column 7, line 6). A wsf (literally "missing") lacuna signals a lacuna in the document from which the Turin canon was copied in Ramesside times. This would establish Nerikare as the third king of the dynasty, although the lacuna might have comprised two kings and Nerikare could possibly be the fourth ruler, following an unknown king. The duration of Nerikare's reign is reported as exactly 6 years on the Turin canon, however Ryholt has shown that this is true for all kings marked as wsf and that this figure was likely inserted by the author of the king list in order to avoid chronological gaps. Instead, Ryholt proposes that Nerikare reigned for only 1 year. Furthermore, the existence of a Nile record dated to his first regnal year indicates that he accessed the throne at the beginning of a calendar year, before the season of inundation during which such records were inscribed.

== Nomen ==
In his 1997 study of the second intermediate period, Kim Ryholt proposes that Nerikare's nomen may have been "Sobek". This nomen appears on three seals, which can be dated to the 13th dynasty, before Sobekhotep III. Since the nomina of all but two kings of this period are known, he argues that only Nerikare or Sekhemrekhutawy Khabaw might have borne this nomen.

Preceded by Sonbef	Pharaoh of Egypt; Thirteenth Dynasty	Succeeded by Amenemhat V
