= Sekhemkare Amenemhat Senebef =

Egyptian pharaoh

Sonbef
- Senebef, Senbef, Amenemhat Senbef, Sonbef
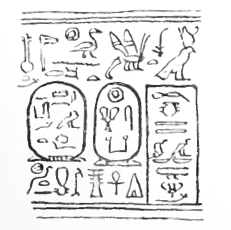
- Cylinder seal bearing the royal titulary of Sonbef, drawing by Flinders Petrie.

Pharaoh
- Reign: 4 years (highest att.); 1800–1796BC; 1799–1795BC
- Predecessor: Sekhemre Khutawy Sobekhotep
- Successor: Nerikare (Ryholt) or Pantjeny (von Beckerath)
Royal titulary
Horus name
Mehibtawy
Mḥ-jb-t3.wj
Favorite of the two lands
He whom the two lands trust
G5	mH ib N16 N16
Nebty name
Itisekhemef
Jṯj-sḫm=f
He who seizes his power
G16 V15 Y8 f
Prenomen
Sekhemkare
Sḫm-k3-Rˁ
Mighty is the Ka of Ra
M23 t L2 t < N5 s S42 D28 >
Turin canon:
Sekhemkare A[menemhat Sonbe]f
Sḫm-k3-Rˁ J[mn-m-ḥ3.t snb].f
Mighty is the Ka of Ra, A[menemhat's son Sonbe]f
< N5 Y8 D28 Z1 > G7 i mn n HASH f
Nomen
Amenemhat [Sa] Sonbef
Jmn-m-ḥ3.t [s3]snb.f
Amenemhat['s son] Sonbef
G39 N5 < i mn n m HAt t s n b f >
- Dynasty: 13th Dynasty; Middle Kingdom Period

Sekhemkare Amenemhat Senebef (also Sonbef, Amenemhat Senbef; Senebef) was an Egyptian pharaoh of the early 13th Dynasty, often considered as the final part of the late Middle Kingdom or early Second Intermediate Period.

== Attestations ==
As a king of the early 13th Dynasty, Sonbef may have reigned from Itjtawy in the Faiyum. However, the only contemporary attestations of him are from south of Thebes. These include a scarab seal of unknown provenance, a cylinder seal from the Amherst collection and now in the Metropolitan Museum of Art.

=== Upper Egypt ===
At El-Tod, two inscribed blocks has the prenomen "Sekhemkare".

=== Nubia ===
In Nubia, two Nile Level Records with the prenomen Sekhemkare are also attributable to him, one from Askut and dated to his Year 3, and the other from Semna dated to his Year 4. Less certain is a much damaged record from Semna dated to a year 5 that may belong to Sekhemkare.

The ownership of these Nile records is still in doubt however, as they only bear the prenomen Sekhemkare, which Amenemhat V also bore. The Egyptologist and archaeologist Stuart Tyson Smith, who studied the records initially attributed them to Sonbef, but later changed his opinion and attributed them to Amenemhat V.

=== Unknown provenance ===
BM EA 75196 | A statue belonging to vizier Khenmes, including the royal name of king Sekhemkare.

=== Non-contemporary attestations ===
==== Turin King list ====
The Turin King List 7:06 mentions "The Dual King Sekhemkara ... years ... lacuna years, 6 years". Ryholt has read it as "Sekhemkare [Amenemhat Sonbe]f". The reign length is lost and followed by a lacuna of years. He is preceded in this list by Khutawyra (7:05) and succeeded by Amenemhat(ra) (7:07).

== Theories ==
=== Chronology ===
According to Egyptologists Kim Ryholt, Jürgen von Beckerath and Darrell Baker, he was the second king of the dynasty, reigning from 1800 BC until 1796 BC.

=== Identity ===
Egyptologists debate whether Sekhemkare Sonbef is the same king as Sekhemkare Amenemhat V. Indeed, Sonbef called himself "Amenemhat Sonbef"; this can be a simple double name or a filiation meaning Son of Amenemhat, Sonbef.

Both Ryholt and Baker consider Sonbef a son of Amenemhat IV and a brother of Sekhemre Khutawy Sobekhotep. Thus, they see Sonbef and Amenemhat V as two different rulers, an opinion also shared by Jürgen von Beckerath. Ryholt and Baker further posit that Sonbef's and Amenemhat's rules were separated by the ephemeral reign of Nerikare, while von Beckerath believes it was Sekhemre Khutawy Pantjeny who reigned between the two. At the opposite Detlef Franke and Stephen Quirke believe that Amenemhat V and Sonbef are one and the same person. Franke and others regard "Amenemhat Sonbef" as a double name. Indeed, double naming was common in Egypt and especially in the late 12th and 13th Dynasty.

Preceded by Sekhemre Khutawy Sobekhotep	Pharaoh of Egypt; Thirteenth Dynasty	Succeeded by Nerikare
