= Sekhemre Khutawy Sobekhotep =

Egyptian pharaoh

- Amenemhat Sobekhotep; Sobekhotep I
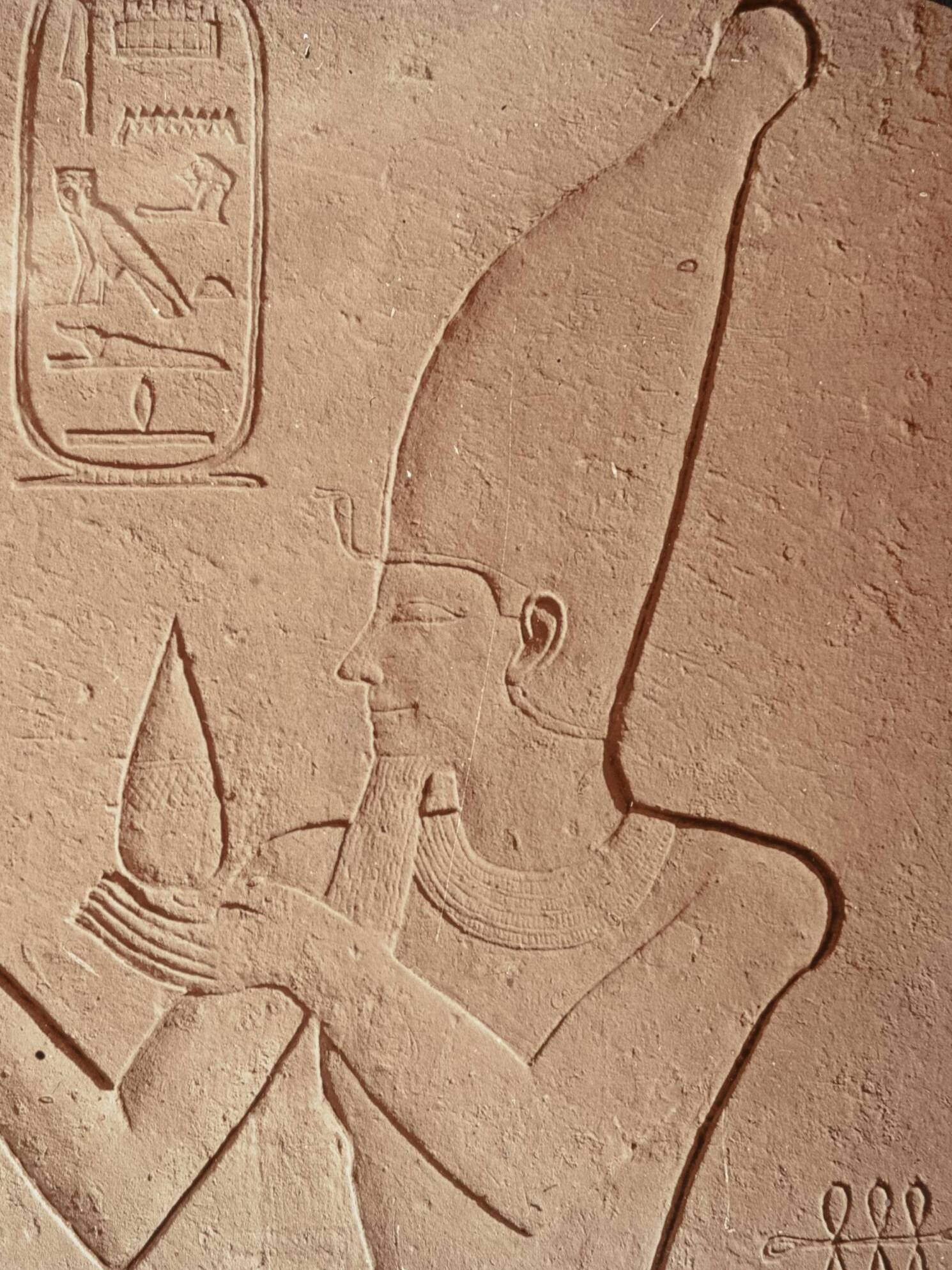
- Relief of Sobekhotep from the Temple of Montu

Pharaoh
- Reign: 4 years (highest attributed) in the 18th century BC (Note: Proposed dates for the reign of Sobekhotep: 1803–1800 BC, 1802–1800 BC, 1786–1783 BC, 1781–? BC, c. 1750 BC, 1737–1733 BC, 1724–1718 BC.)
- Predecessor: Uncertain: Sobekneferu or Sedjefakare Kay Amenemhat VII
- Successor: Uncertain: Sekhemkare Amenemhat Senebef or Khendjer
Royal titulary
Horus name
mnḫ-[...]
Menekh-[...]
Potent [...]
G5	Y5 N35 Aa1 U22 HASH
Golden Horus
ꜥnḫ-nṯrw
Ankh Netjeru
The life of the gods
G8	S34 H_SPACE Z2 R8
Prenomen
sḫm-rꜥ-ḫw-tꜣwy
Sekhemre Khutawy
The mighty one of Ra is the protection of the Two Lands

M23 X1 L2 X1	N5 Y8 D43 N17 N17
sḫm-rꜥ-ḫw-tꜣwy-sbk-ḥtp
Sekhemre Khutawy Sobekhotep
The mighty one of Ra is the protection of the Two Lands; Sobek is satisfied

M23 X1 L2 X1	N5 Y8 D43 N17 N17 I5A R4 X1 Q3
Nomen
ỉmn-m-ḥꜣt sbk-ḥtp
Amenemhat Sobekhotep
Amun is at the forefront; Sobek is satisfied
or
ỉmn-m-ḥꜣt [sꜣ] sbk-ḥtp
Amenemhat sa Sobekhotep
Amenemhat's son Sobekhotep

G39 N5	M17 Y5 N35 G17 F4 X1 I5A R4 X1 Q3
- Father: Uncertain, possibly Amenemhat IV
- Mother: Sobekneferu (possibly)
- Dynasty: 13th Dynasty

Sekhemre Khutawy Sobekhotep, Amenemhat Sobekhotep, or Sobekhotep I, (Note: In some literature he is referred to as Sobekhotep II and Khaankhre Sobekhotep as Sobekhotep I instead. This reflects Khaankhre Sobekhotep's position as an earlier ruler in the Turin Canon in Column 7, Line 15 under the name Sobekhotepre.) was a pharaoh of ancient Egypt in the early Thirteenth Dynasty of the late Middle Kingdom or early Second Intermediate Period. (Note: There is no firm consensus across Egyptologists as to whether the Middle Kingdom period concludes with the Twelfth or Thirteenth Dynasty. There is a continuation in the arts and culture following the transition between the two dynasties, but an immediate political change as the longevity of individual suzerains dissipates from decades-long to years- or months-long. Thus, academics focussing on the former subject tend to include the Thirteenth Dynasty in the Middle Kingdom, whereas those focussed on the latter subject identify it with the Second Intermediate Period.)

His chronological position is much debated. Kim Ryholt (1997) makes a strong case for Sobekhotep as the founder of the dynasty, a hypothesis that is now dominant in Egyptology. If so, he may be the first ruler with this name, making him Sobekhotep I. His double name may also be a filiation, Sobekhotep, son of Amenemhat.

== Reign ==
We know almost nothing about his reign except what can be interpreted by archaeological finds. He ruled at a time of political turmoil during the early Thirteenth Dynasty, where the order of succession is unclear. At Lahun, a papyrus indicate that he ruled not long after Amenemhat III. The Nile level records were also inscribed for a limited number of rulers of the late 12th and early 13th dynasties. However, the Turin King List column 7 placed him in the middle of the list if read as a sequence of successors. Consequently, some scholars believe the scribe made a mistake where he should be put at the top of that list. His double name Amenemhat Sobekhotep may be a filiation meaning "Sobekhotep, son of Amenemhat" indicating he was a son of Amenemhat III or Amenemhat IV. Amenemhat III is only known to have had daughters. An antiyant husband (regent) or grandchild (by the first rank daughter) may have laid claim on the throne.

=== Chronological position ===
The subject of positively determining the successor to the throne following the reign of Sobekneferu – the final ruler of the Twelfth Dynasty and one of the few women to have held regnal power in Egypt, perhaps the first – has persisted in Egyptological discourse and is split between two candidates: Khutawyre Wegaf and Sekhemkhare Khutawy Sobekhotep.

The Turin Canon separates the rulers of the Twelfth and Thirteenth Dynasty with a summary that accords the former with eight kings ruling for 213 years, 1 month, and 15+x days. Thereafter it opens discussion of the kings that followed after Sehotepibre – the prenomen of Amenemhat I. The founding of the Thirteenth Dynasty is accorded to Khutawyre, who is stated to have reigned for two years, three months, and 24 days. Sobekhotep is listed in the papyrus under Sekhemre Khutawy Sobekhotep as the 15th king, though the length of his reign is lost in a lacuna.

However, the Nile level records and his appearance on a papyrus found at Lahun indicate that he might date to the early 13th Dynasty. In both monument types only kings of the late 12th and early 13th Dynasty are mentioned. Egyptologist Kim Ryholt maintains that it is possible that the writer of the list confused Sekhemre Khutawy with Khutawyre, the nomen of Wegaf.

== Contemporary attestations ==
Presumed portrait of Sobekhotep (Louvre E 12924), though alternate attributions have been proposed.

Sobekhotep is attested by contemporary sources dating to the early 13th Dynasty.

In Year 1, he is attested on a papyrus at Lahun in the middle part of Egypt. Later, he is mainly attested by architectural elements in the 4th Nome of Thebes. His highest attested date is Year 4 according to Nile level records in Nubia.

=== Documents ===
==== Kahun Papyrus IV, Petrie Museum UC 32166 ====
He is mentioned on the Kahun Papyrus IV. Written in hieratic text, it contains "a census of the household of a lector-priest that is dated to the first regnal year" of the king. The household includes a son of the lector-priest, and the papyrus records the birth of this son during a 40th regnal year of an unnamed king, "which can only refer to Amenemhat III." This establishes that Sekhemre Khutawy Sobekhotep reigned close in time to Amenemhat III, with the son still part of the household of the lector-priest.

==== Nile level records ====
In Nubia, three graffito were left at the second cataract forts during the reign of Sobekhotep: two at Semna during regnal years two and three and one at Kumma in regnal year four – the highest attested regnal year for the king. The graffito at Kumma records the height of the Nile inundation as being +2.91 m (9.5 ft) in Sobekhotep's fourth regnal year. (Note: The value here is as compared against the lowest recorded level of the inundation in a graffito (SNM 34405 / RIK 8 / No. 379) during the reign of Amenemhat III in his 40th regnal year which was marked at 155.07 m (508.8 ft) above mean sea level.)

==== Cylinder seals ====
The Met has a cylinder seal (MET 30.8.319) belonging to Sobekhotep that bears his nomen on one side and an epithet on the other. The glazed steatite seal measures 2.1 cm (0.83 in) long with a diameter of 0.7 cm (0.28 in). The British Museum possesses three glazed steatite cylinder seals that may be associated with Sobekhotep as they bear the prenomen Sekhemre Khutawy on one side and an epithet associated with Sobek on the other. (Note: The identification of any mention of Sekhemre Khutawy is difficult, as other kings have had this prenomen: Sekhemre Khutawy Pantjeny and Sekhemre Khutawy Khabaw.) Two seals (EA 16752 and EA 28867) are smaller measuring 1.38 cm (0.54 in) and 1.64 cm (0.65 in) long with a diameter of 0.48 cm (0.19 in) and 0.56 cm (0.22 in) respectively. The remaining seal (EA 17029) is larger measuring 2.15 cm (0.85 in) with a diameter of 0.51 cm (0.20 in).

Cylinder seal (MET 30.8.319, front) bearing 'Son of Ra, Amenemhat Sobekhotep ...'

Cylinder seal (MET 30.8.319, back) bearing '... beloved of Sobek-Ra, Lord of Iu-miteru'

=== Architecture ===
A number of architectural elements bearing Sobekhotep's titulary are known: a fragment of a Hebsed chapel from Medamud, three lintels from Deir el-Bahri and Medamud, an architrave from Luxor and a doorjamb from Medamud that is now in the Louvre.

==== Medamud, Temple of Montu ====
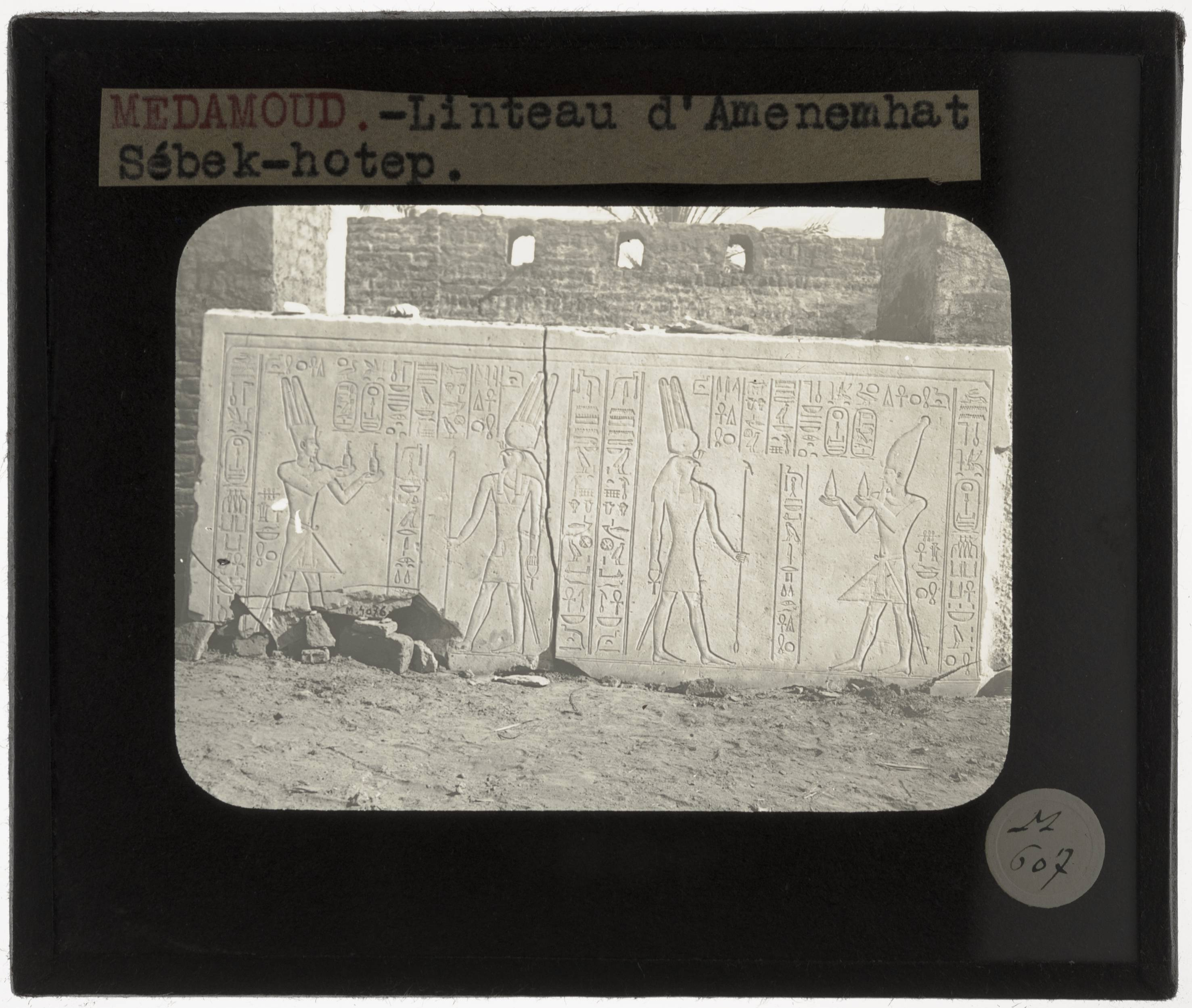

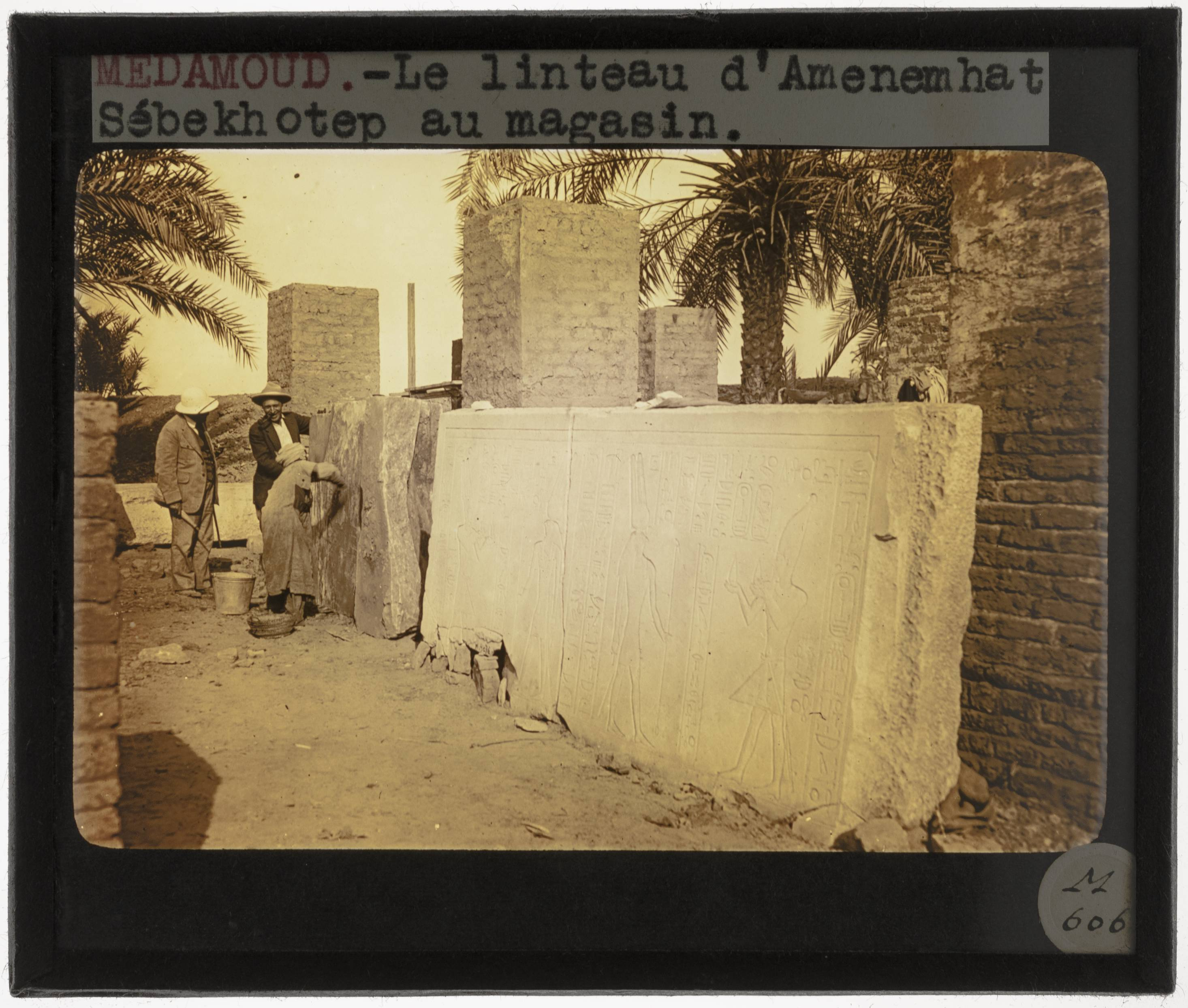

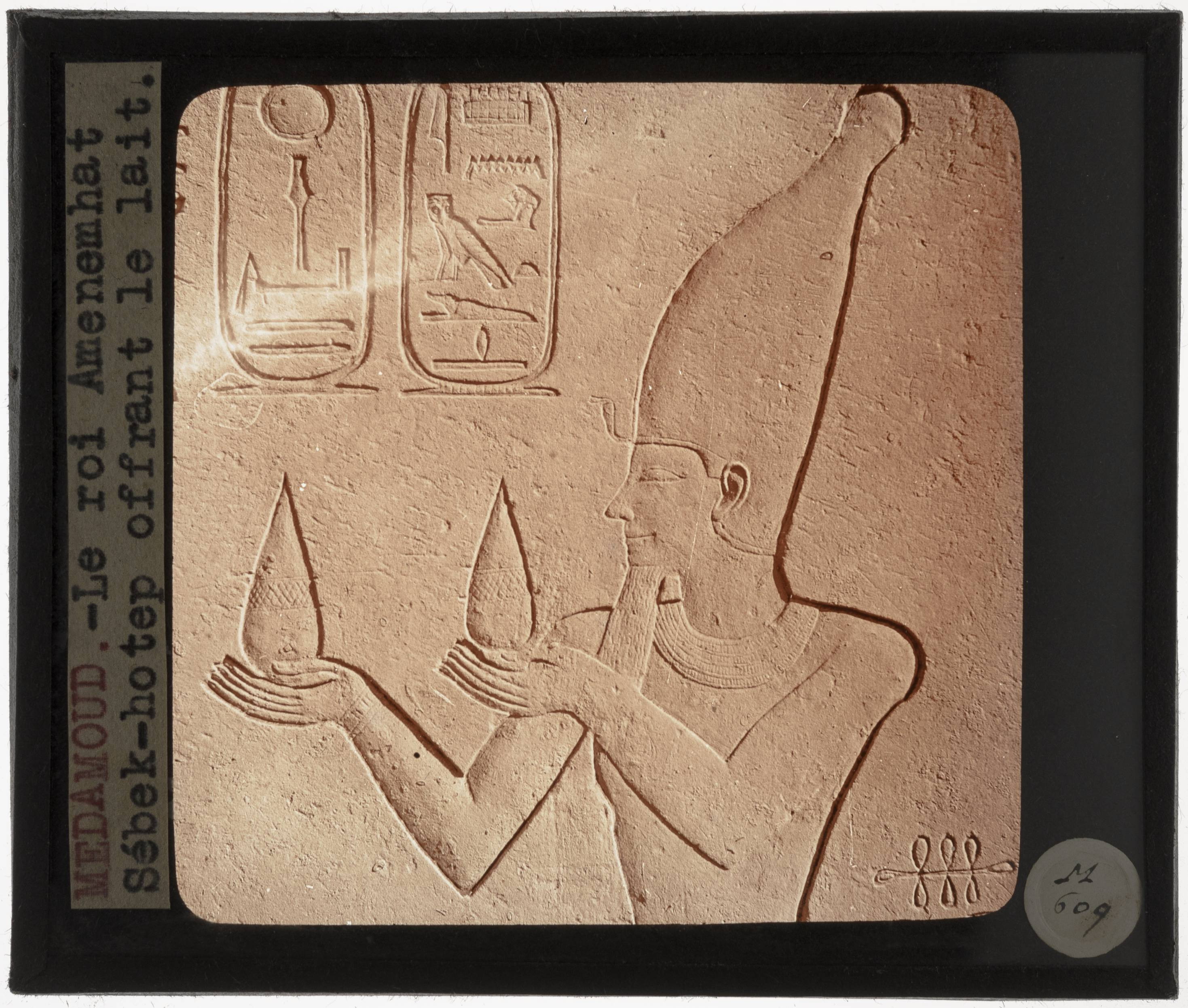

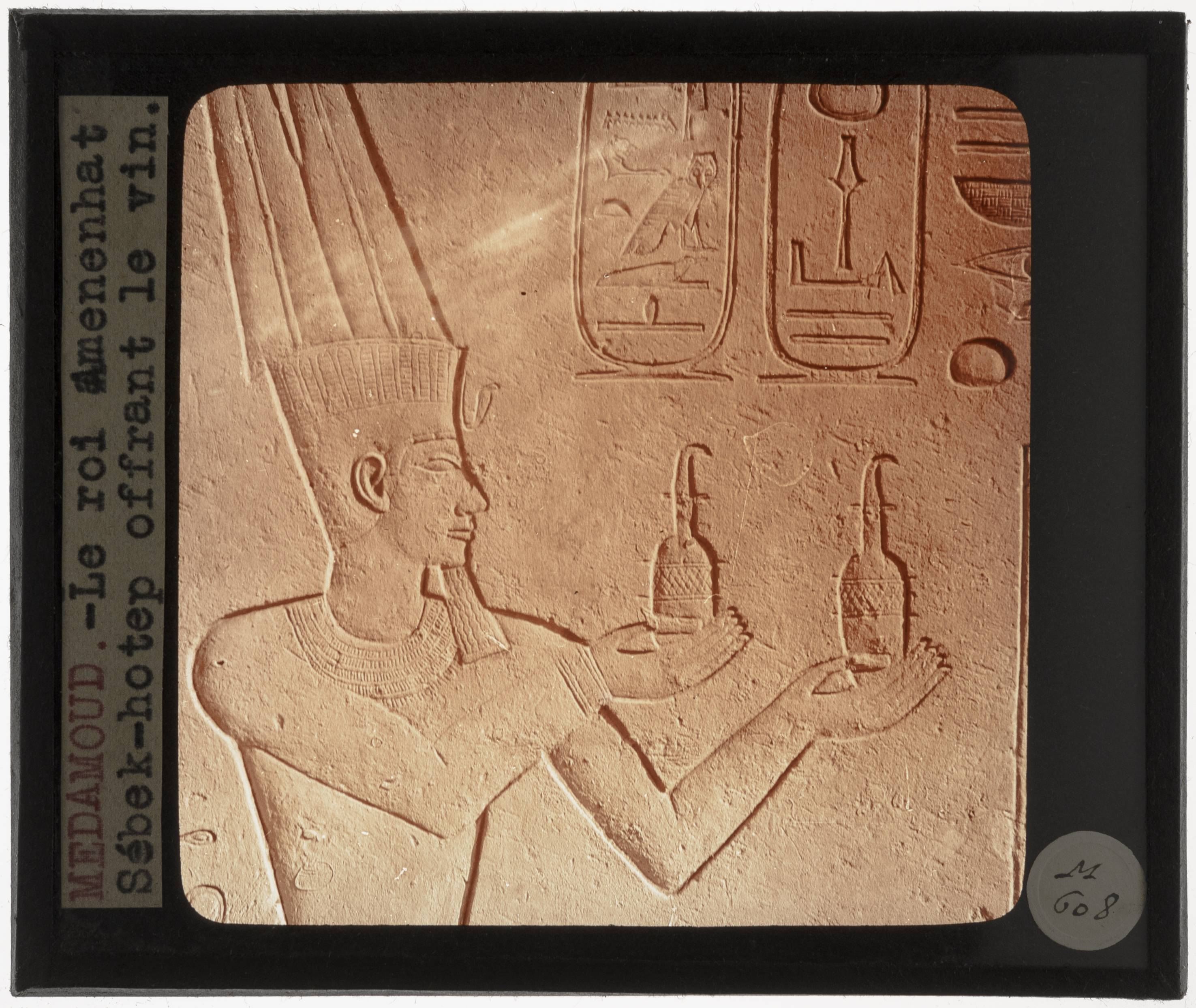

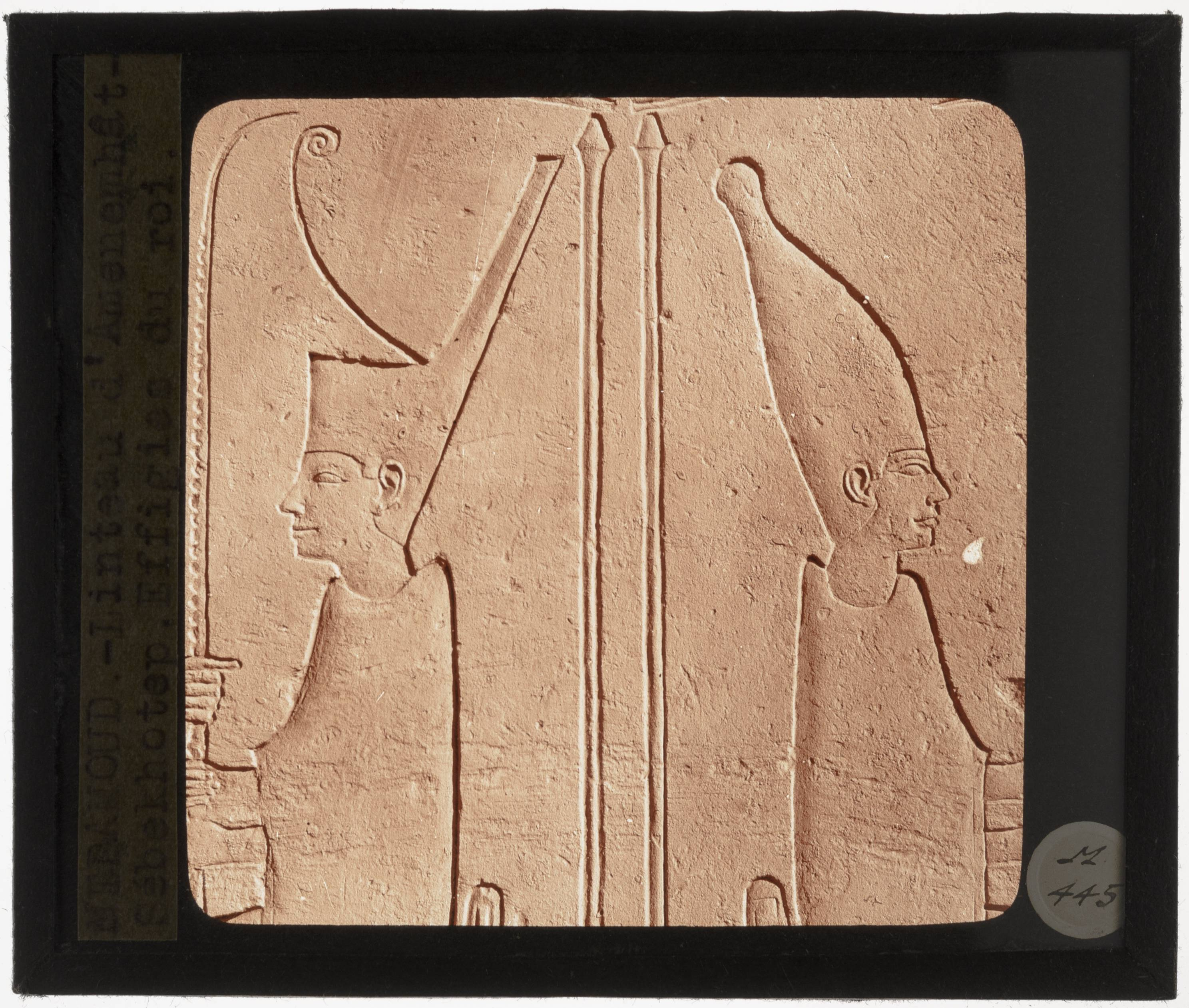

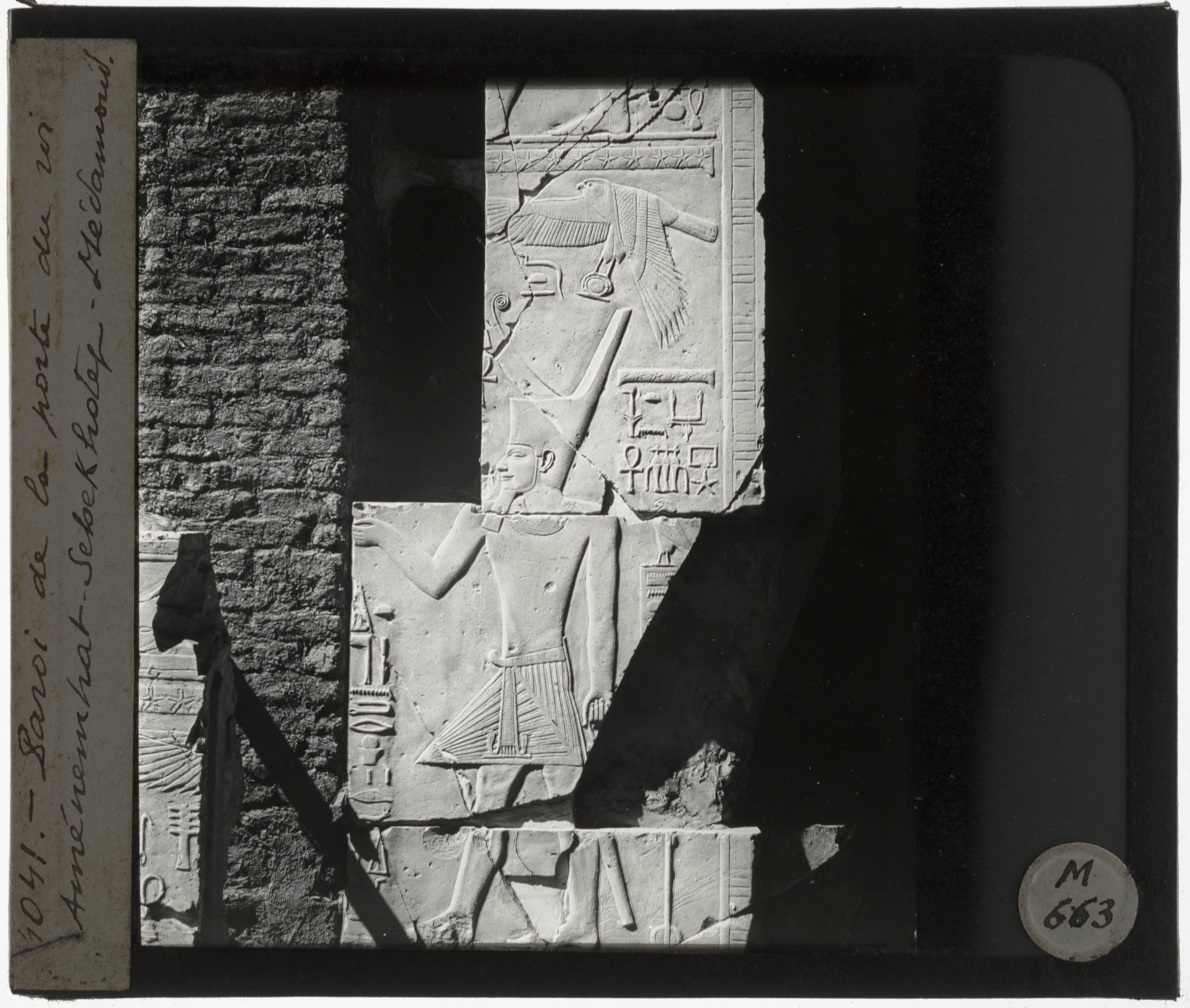

==== Deir el-Bahri, Temple of Mentuhotep II ====
Sobekhotep contributed a relief to a limestone door lintel in the mortuary temple of Mentuhotep II at Deir el-Bahari.

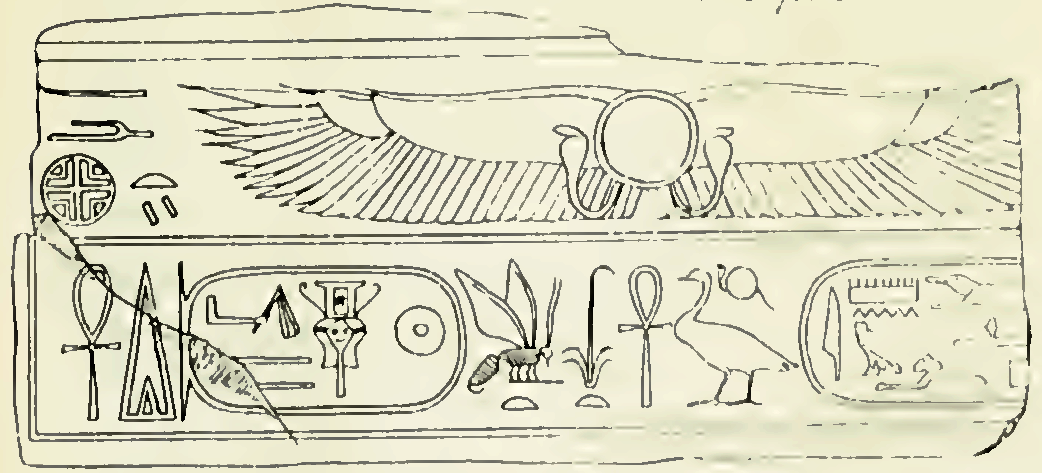
Sobekhotep's titulary inscribed on a door lintel at Mentuhotep II's mortuary temple in Deir el-Bahari.

=== Small finds ===
Smaller artifacts mentioning Sobekhotep comprise an adze-blade, a statuette from Kerma and a faience bead, now in the Petrie Museum (UC 13202).

== Later attestations ==
In the Thutmosid period, Sekhemre Khutawy is attested on the Karnak list of early Egyptian kings in the thirty-sixth entry. (Note: This entry corresponds to right wall, top register, fifth column.)

The Turin King List 7:19 contains the entry: "The Dual King Sobekhotep I reigned x years ...". In the list he is predeceded by 7:18 Sedjefakare and succeeded by 7:20 by Khendjer. Some scholars believe the scribe made an error being interchanged with 7:01 Khutawyre Wegaf.

== Burial ==
The tomb of Sobekhotep has not been found. His tomb was believed to have been discovered in Abydos in 2013, but this attribution is now questioned. During a 2013 excavation in Abydos, a team of archaeologists led by Josef W. Wegner of the University of Pennsylvania discovered the tomb of a king with the name Sobekhotep. While Sobekhotep I was named as owner of the tomb on several press reports since January 2014, further investigations made it more likely that the tomb belongs to king Sobekhotep IV instead.

== Theories ==
His double name Amenemhat Sobekhotep may be a filiation meaning "Sobekhotep, son of Amenemhat". It has been suggested that Sobekhotep was a son of the penultimate pharaoh of the 12th Dynasty, king Amenemhat IV. Therefore, Sobekhotep may have been a brother of Sekhemkare Sonbef, the second ruler of the 13th Dynasty. Other Egyptologists read Amenemhat Sobekhotep as a double name, these being common in the Twelfth and Thirteenth Dynasty.

== Bibliography ==
=== Books ===
- Clayton, Peter A. (1994). Chronicle of the Pharaohs. London: Thames & Hudson. ISBN 978-0-500-05074-3.
- Dodson, Aidan; Hilton, Dyan (2004). The Complete Royal Families of Ancient Egypt. London: Thames & Hudson. ISBN 0-500-05128-3.
- Dunham, Dows; Janssen, Jozef Marie Antoon (1960). Semna Kumma. Second Cataract Forts. Vol. 1. Boston: Museum of Fine Arts. OCLC 1419130756.
- Gauthier, Henri (1907–1917). Le Livre Des Rois d'Égypte: Recueil de Titres et Protocoles Royaux, Suivi d'Un Index Alphabetique. Mémoires publiés par les membres de l'Institut Français d'Archéologie Orientale du Caire (in French). Vol. 17–21. Le Caire: l'Institut Français d’Archéologie Orientale. OCLC 2712785.
- Grajetzki, Wolfram (2006). The Middle Kingdom of Ancient Egypt: History, Archaeology and Society. London: Duckworth. ISBN 0-7156-3435-6.
- Grimal, Nicolas (1992). A History of Ancient Egypt. Translated by Ian Shaw. Oxford: Blackwell Publishing. ISBN 978-0-631-19396-8.
- Hayes, William (1978) [1946]. The Scepter of Egypt: A Background for the Study of the Egyptian Antiquities in the Metropolitan Museum of Art, Part 1. From the Earliest Times to the End of the Middle Kingdom. New York: Metropolitan Museum of Art. ISBN 0-87099-190-6.
- Hintze, Fritz; Reineke, Walter F. (1989). Felsinschriften aus dem sudanesischen Nubien. Publikation der Nubien-Expedition 1961—1963 (in German). Vol. 1 & 2. Berlin: Akademie-Verlag Berlin. ISBN 3-05-000370-7.
- Kitchen, Kenneth A. (1975–1990). Ramesside Inscriptions: Historical and Biographical. Oxford: Blackwell. ISBN 0-903563-08-8. OCLC 1340684401.
- Krauss, Rolf; Warburton, David (2006). "Conclusions and Chronological Tables". In Hornung, Erik; Krauss, Rolf; Warburton, David (eds.). Ancient Egyptian Chronology. Leiden: Brill. pp. 473–498. ISBN 978-90-04-11385-5.
- Naville, Édouard (1910). The XIth Dynasty Temple at Deir el-Bahari, Part II. Memoirs of the Egypt Exploration Fund. Vol. 30. London: The Egypt Exploration Fund.
- Oppenheim, Adela; Arnold, Dorothea; Arnold, Dieter; Yamamoto, Kumiko, eds. (2015). Ancient Egypt Transformed: the Middle Kingdom. New York: Metropolitan Museum of Art. ISBN 9781588395641.
- Redford, Donald B., ed. (2001). "Egyptian King List". The Oxford Encyclopedia of Ancient Egypt. Vol. 3. Oxford: Oxford University Press. pp. 621–622. ISBN 0-19-510234-7.
- Ryholt, Kim (1997). The Political Situation in Egypt during the Second Intermediate Period, c. 1800-1550 B.C. Copenhagen: Museum Tusculanum Press. ISBN 87-7289-421-0.
- Schneider, Thomas (2006). "The Relative Chronology of the Middle Kingdom and the Hyksos Period (Dyns. 12-17)". In Hornung, Erik; Krauss, Rolf; Warburton, David (eds.). Ancient Egyptian Chronology. Leiden: Brill. pp. 168–196. ISBN 978-90-04-11385-5.
- Shaw, Ian; Nicholson, Paul (1995). British Museum Dictionary of Ancient Egypt. London: British Museum. ISBN 0-7141-0982-7.
- Yvanez, Elsa (2010). Rock Inscriptions from Semna and Kumma: Epigraphic Study. Khartoum: Sudan National Museum & Section Français de la Direction des Antiquités du Soudan.

=== Journal articles ===
- De Putter, Thierry (1993). "Les inscriptions de Semna et Koumma (Nubie): Niveaux de crues exceptionnelles ou d'un lac de retenue artificiel du Moyen Empire?". Studien zur Altägyptischen Kultur (in French). 20: 255–288. ISSN 0340-2215. JSTOR 25150203.
- Grajetzki, Wolfram (2013). Wendrich, Willeke (ed.). "Late Middle Kingdom". UCLA Encyclopedia of Egyptology: 1–14. ISSN 2693-7425.
- Grimal, Nicolas (2010). "Les ancêtres de Karnak". Comptes rendus des séances de l'Académie des Inscriptions et Belles-Lettres (in French). 154: 343–370. ISSN 0065-0536.
- Lepsius, Karl Richard (1853). "über die 12. Ägyptische Königsdynastie". Abhandlungen der Königlichen Akademie der Wissenschaften zu Berlin aus dem Jahre 1852. Berlin: Königlichen Akademie der Wissenschaften: 425–454.
- Siesse, Julien (2016–2017). "L'identité du fondateur de la 13e dynastie : Amenemhat-Sobekhotep ou Ougaf?". Cahiers de Recherches de l'Institut de Papyrologie et d'Égyptologie de Lille (in French). 31. Lille: Université de Lille: 161–178. ISSN 0153-5021.

=== Museum catalogues ===
- "Rechercher dans les collections". Louvre. n.d.
- "Explore the collection". The British Museum. n.d.
- "The Met Collection". The MET. The Metropolitan Museum of Art. n.d.

Preceded by uncertain Sobekneferu or Sedjefakare	Pharaoh of Egypt; Thirteenth Dynasty	Succeeded by uncertain Sonbef or Khendjer
