= Amenemhat IV =

Pharaoh of Egypt

- Ammenemes
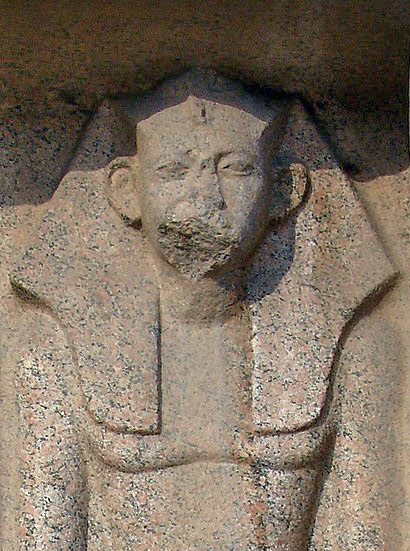
- Statue of Amenemhat IV from the funerary temple of Amenemhat III at Hawara

Pharaoh
- Reign: 9 years 3 months and 27 days 1822–1812 BC, 1815–1806 BC, 1808–1799 BC, 1807–1798 BC, 1786–1777 BC, 1772–1764 BC
- Coregency: most likely 2 years with Amenemhat III
- Predecessor: Amenemhat III
- Successor: Sobekneferu
Royal titulary
Horus name
Kheperkheperu
Ḫpr-ḫprw
Horus, Everlasting of manifestations
G5	xpr xpr Z3 w
Nebty name
Sehebtawy
[S]-ḥ3b-t3wj
He who makes the two lands festive
G16	Ba15 s Ba15a H b W4 N16 N16
Golden Horus
Sekhembiknebunetjeru
Sḫm-bik-nbw-nṯrw
The golden Horus, powerful one of the gods
sxm G8 nTrw
Prenomen
Maakherure
M3ˁ-ḫrw-Rˁ
The voice of Ra is true
M23 t L2 t < ra U5 a xrw w >
Turin canon:
Maakherure
M3ˁ-ḫrw-Rˁ
The voice of Ra is true
< N5 U4 a P8 Z7 A17 > G7
Nomen
Amenemhat
Jmn-m-ḥ3.t
Amun is in front
G39 N5 < i mn n m HAt t >
- Children: uncertain, possibly Ameny, Sekhemre Khutawy Sobekhotep, and Sonbef
- Father: uncertain, possibly Amenemhat III (perhaps as adoptive father)
- Mother: Hetepti
- Burial: uncertain Southern Mazghuna pyramid ?
- Dynasty: 12th Dynasty

See Amenemhat, for other individuals with this name.

Amenemhat IV (also known as Amenemhet IV) was the seventh and penultimate king of the late Twelfth Dynasty of Egypt during the late Middle Kingdom period. He arguably ruled around 1786–1777 BC for about nine regnal years.

Amenemhat IV may have been the son, grandson, son-in-law, or stepson of his predecessor, the powerful Amenemhat III. His reign started with a seemingly peaceful two-year coregency with Amenemhat III. He undertook expeditions in the Sinai for turquoise, in Upper Egypt for amethyst, and to the Land of Punt. He also maintained trade relations with Byblos as well as continuing the Egyptian presence in Nubia.

Amenemhat IV built some parts of the temple of Hathor at Serabit el-Khadim in the Sinai, and constructed the well-preserved temple of Renenutet in Medinet Madi. The tomb of Amenemhat IV has not been identified, although the Southern Mazghuna pyramid is a possibility.

Amenemhat IV was succeeded by Sobekneferu, who may have been his sister or stepsister; she was a daughter of Amenemhat III. Her reign marked the end of the Twelfth Dynasty and the beginning of the Middle Kingdom's decline into the Second Intermediate Period.

== Family ==
Amenemhat IV's mother was a woman named Hetepti. Hetepti's only known attestation is an inscription on the wall of the temple of Renenutet at Medinet Madi, where she is given the title of "King's Mother", but not the titles of "King's Wife", "King's Daughter", or "King's Sister". She may or may not have been a wife of Amenemhat III, as her titles in relation to Amenemhat III might have been omitted in an inscription from her son's reign. In addition to Amenemhat IV, Hetepti appears to have had a daughter, Merestekhi, attested with the title of "King's Sister" after the accession of Amenemhat IV; her son Ankhew was overseer of the fields in the reign of his uncle Amenemhat IV.

The relationship of Amenemhat IV to Amenemhat III is debated. Amenemhat IV was the son of Amenemhat III according to Manetho, but as he isn't called a "King's Son" in any known reference to him, some historians believe that he was a grandson. However, there is no record of another son of Amenemhat III and as stated above, Hetepti is not known to have been called a "King's Daughter". The absence of queenly titles for Hetepti has led to doubt that Amenemhat IV could have been a son of Amenemhat III.

Africanus' epitome of Manetho indicates that Amenemhat IV (Ammenemēs) was succeeded by his sister Sobekneferu (Skemiophris), who indeed ruled in her own right upon the death of Amenemhat IV and is attested as a daughter of Amenemhat III. Sobekneferu is not known to have borne the title of "King's Wife" or "King's Sister" among her other titles. Egyptologist Kim Ryholt has alternatively proposed that before marrying Amenemhat III, Hetepti had been previously married to another man and that Amenemhat IV came from this marriage, thus becoming Sobekneferu's stepbrother – which could explain the Manethonian tradition.

Although a possible son, the "Son of Re of his body Ameny" is attested (British Museum plaquette no. 22879, but here Ameny might still be a reference to Amenemhat IV himself, if one does not correct "Son of Re" to "King's Son"), Amenemhat IV may have died without a surviving male heir, which could explain why he was succeeded by Sobekneferu. Kim Ryholt, followed by Aidan Dodson, views the first two rulers of the Thirteenth Dynasty, Sobekhotep I and Sonbef, as the sons of Amenemhat IV, based on what they consider the filiative nomen Amenemhat in their fuller names, Amenemhat Sobekhotep and Amenemhat Sonbef. However, Julien Siesse has argued that such an interpretation of the royal names is not supported by the evidence and that the multiple names all refer to the same individual.

== Reign ==
The Turin Canon, a king list redacted during the early Ramesside period, records Amenemhat IV on Column 6, Row 1, and credits him with a reign of 9 years, 3 months and 27 days. Amenemhat IV is also recorded on Entry 65 of the Abydos King List and Entry 38 of the Saqqara Tablet, both of which date to the New Kingdom.

In spite of the Turin canon, the duration of Amenemhat IV's reign is uncertain. It was given as eight years under the name Ammenemēs in Africanus' epitome of Manetho's Aegyptiaca. In any case, Amenemhat IV's rule seems to have been peaceful and uneventful. Amenemhat IV is well attested by contemporary artefacts, including a number of scarab- and cylinder-seals.

=== Coregency ===
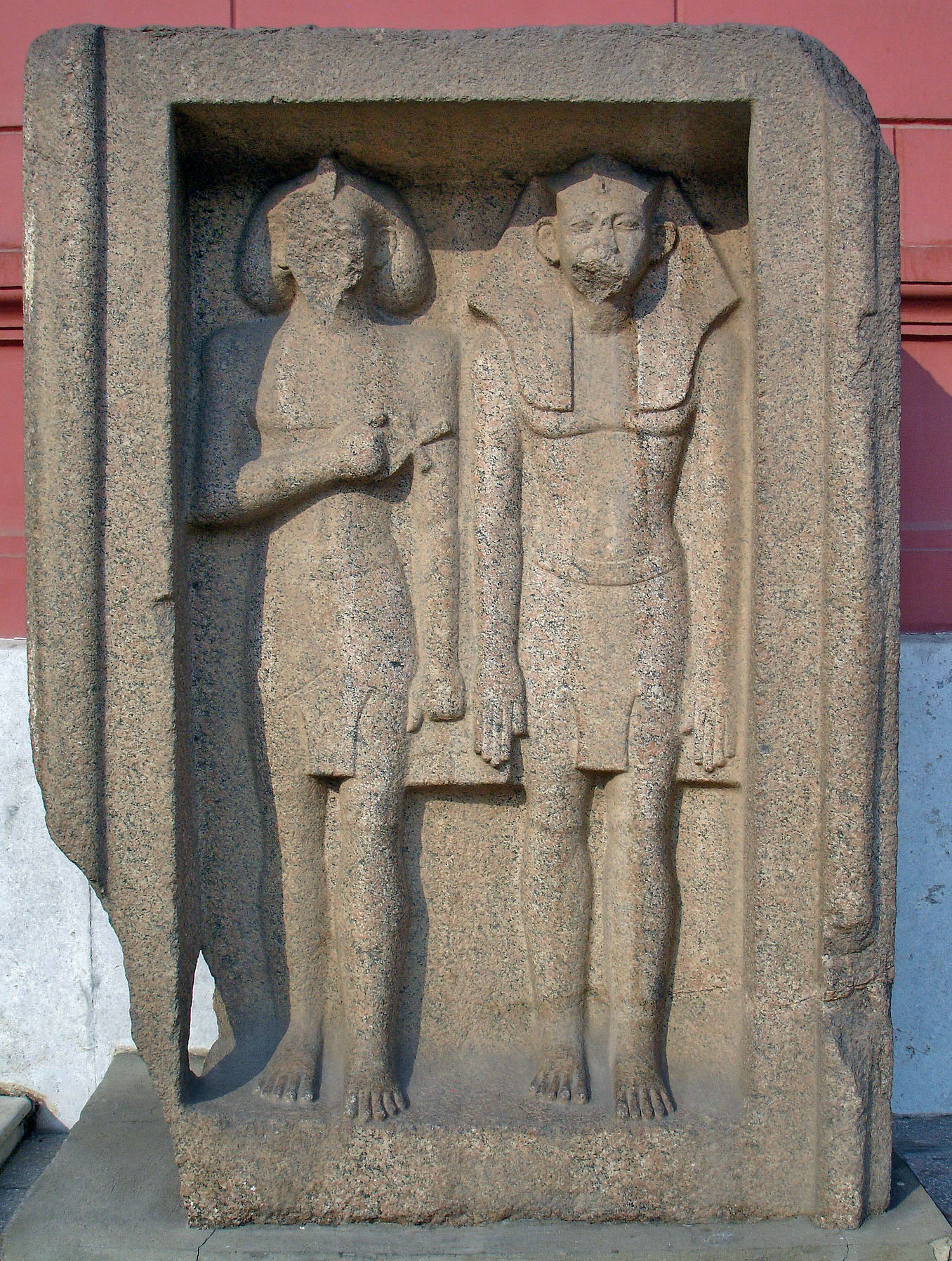
One of the naos from the funerary temple of Amenemhat III at Hawara, now located in the Egyptian Museum at Cairo. The left figure, flexing his arm across his chest in order to bring a sign "ankh" (life) to the face of his partner, is Amenemhat III. The king on the right is Amenemhat IV.

Amenemhat IV first came to power as a junior coregent of his predecessor Amenemhat III, whose reign marks the apex of the Middle Kingdom period. The coregency is well attested by numerous monuments and artefacts where the names of the two kings parallel each other. The length of this coregency is uncertain; it could have lasted from one to seven years, although most scholars believe it was only two years long.

=== Expeditions ===
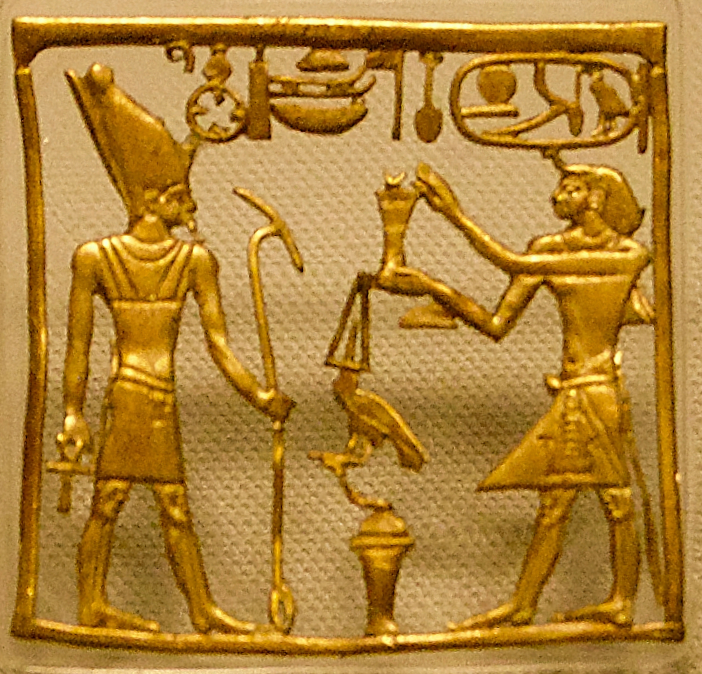
A Gold plaque of Amenemhat IV found at Byblos, Lebanon. It is now part of the collection of the British Museum.

==== The Sinai ====
Four expeditions to the turquoise mines of Serabit el-Khadim in the Sinai are dated to his reign by in-situ inscriptions. The latest took place in his ninth year on the throne and could be the last expedition of the Middle Kingdom, since the next inscription dates to Ahmose I's reign, some 200 years later.

==== Wadi el-Hudi ====
In Year 2 of Amenemhat IV an expedition was sent to mine amethyst in the Wadi el-Hudi in southern Egypt. The leader of the expedition was the assistant treasurer Sahathor.

==== Byblos ====
During his reign, important trade relations must have existed with the city of Byblos on the coast of modern-day Lebanon, where an obsidian and gold chest as well as a jar lid bearing Amenemhat IV's name have been found. A gold plaque showing Amenemhat IV offering to a deity may also originate there.

==== Mersa Gawasis ====
Two fragments of a stela depicting Amenemhat IV and dating to his regnal year 7 were found at Berenice on the Red Sea. In 2010, a report on continuing excavations at Wadi Gawasis on the Red Sea coast notes the finding of two wooden chests and an ostracon inscribed with a hieratic text mentioning an expedition to the fabled Land of Punt in Regnal year 8 of Amenemhat IV, under the direction of the royal scribe Djedy.

=== Nilometer ===
In Nubia, three nilometer records are known from Kumna that are explicitly dated to regnal years 5, 6, and 7, showing that Egyptian presence in the region was maintained during his lifetime.

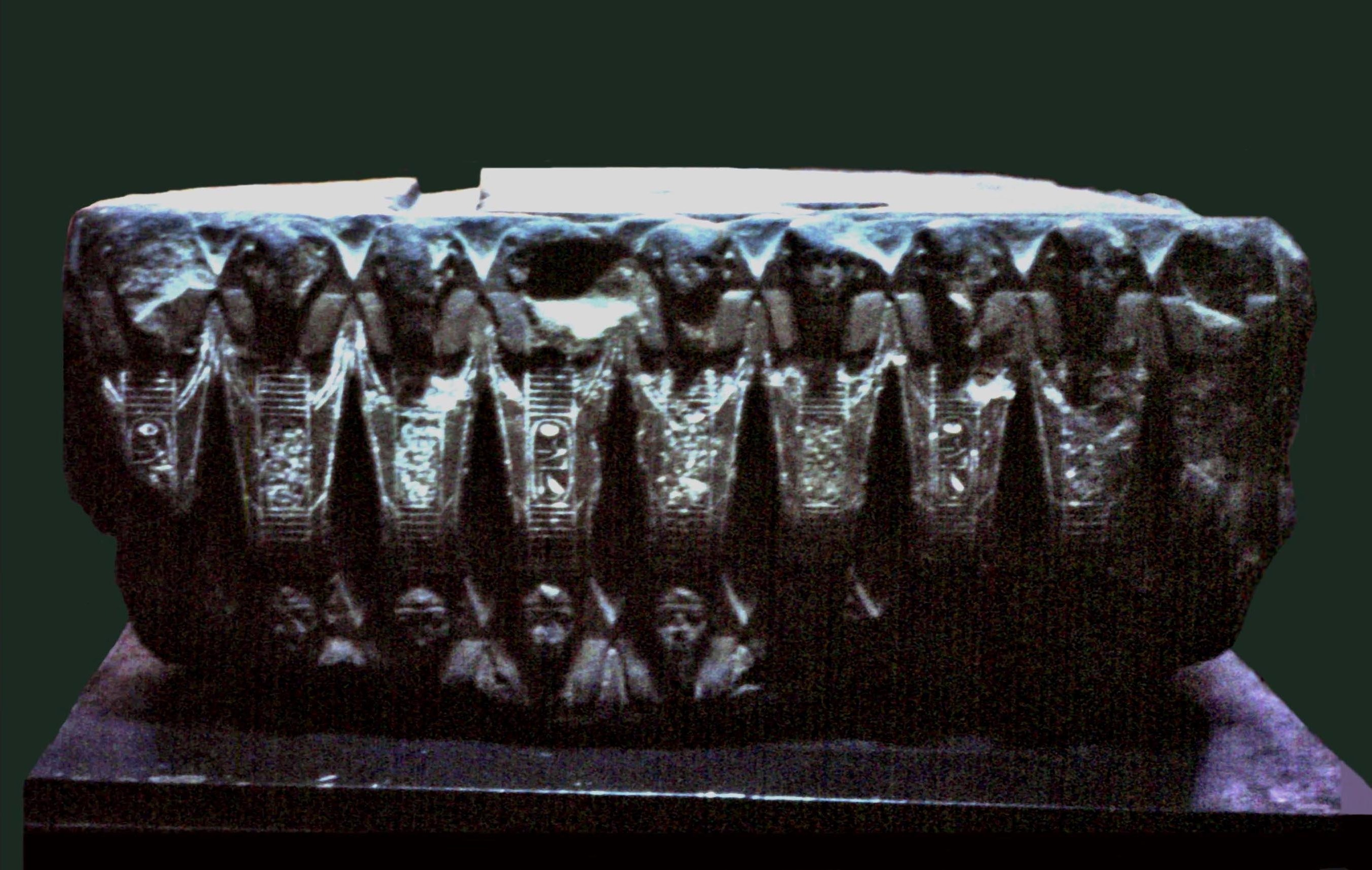
Sculpted ureus with human heads and inscribed with the name of Amenemhat IV. Egyptian Museum Cairo.

=== Building activities ===
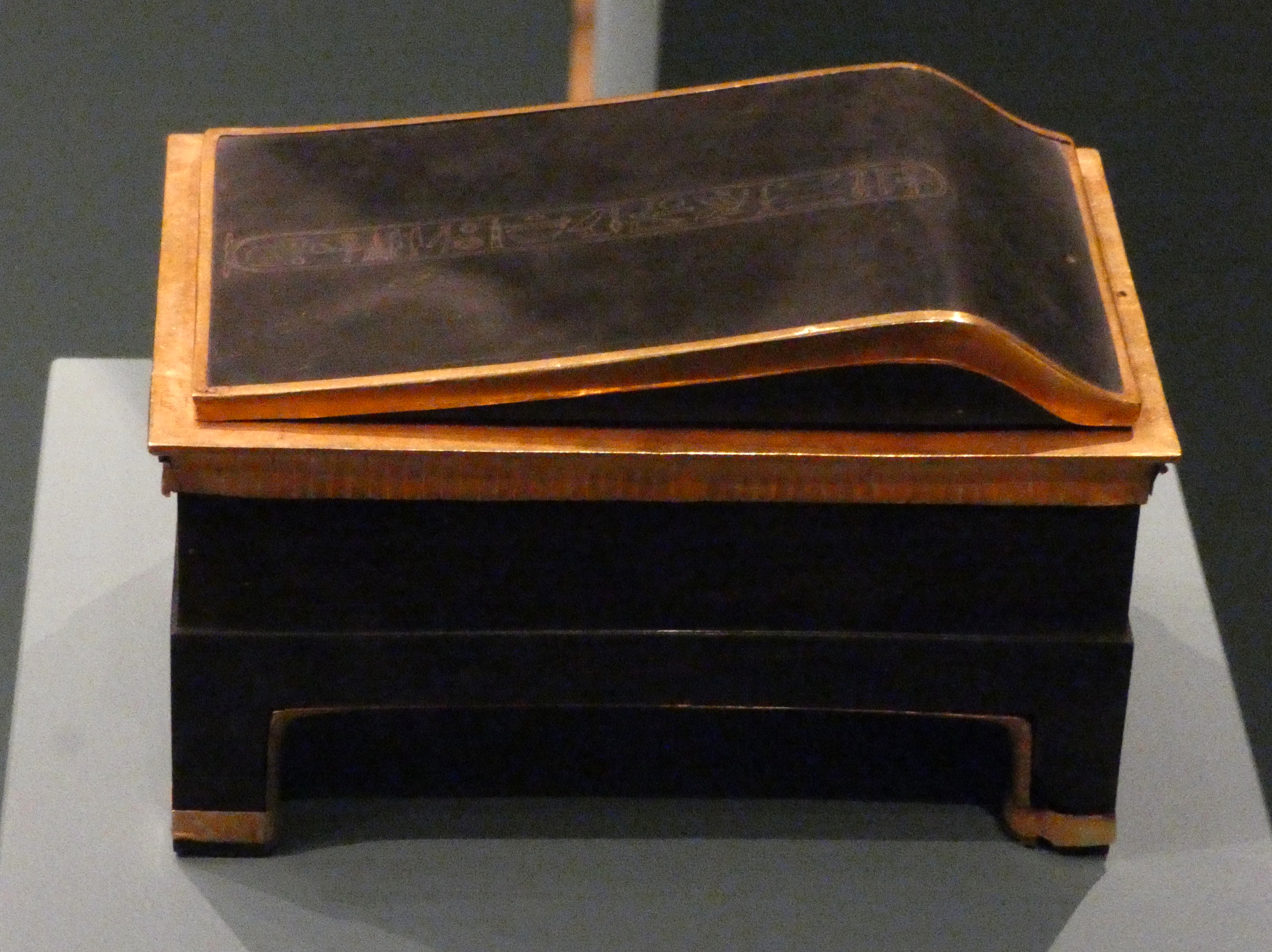
Small obsidian coffer bound in gold and bearing Amenemhat IV's titulary from the Royal necropolis of Byblos

Amenemhat IV completed the temple of Renenutet and Sobek at Medinet Madi that had been started by Amenemhat III. It is "the only intact temple still existing from the Middle Kingdom" according to Zahi Hawass, former Secretary-General of Egypt's Supreme Council of Antiquities (SCA). The foundations of the temple, administrative buildings, granaries, and residences were uncovered by an Egyptian archaeological expedition in early 2006. It is possible that Amenemhat IV built a temple in the northeastern Fayum at Qasr el-Sagha.

Amenemhat IV is responsible for the completion of a shrine at the temple of Hathor in the Sinai and may also have undertaken works in Karnak where a pedestal for a sacred barque inscribed with the names of Amenemhat III and Amenemhat IV was found in 1924.

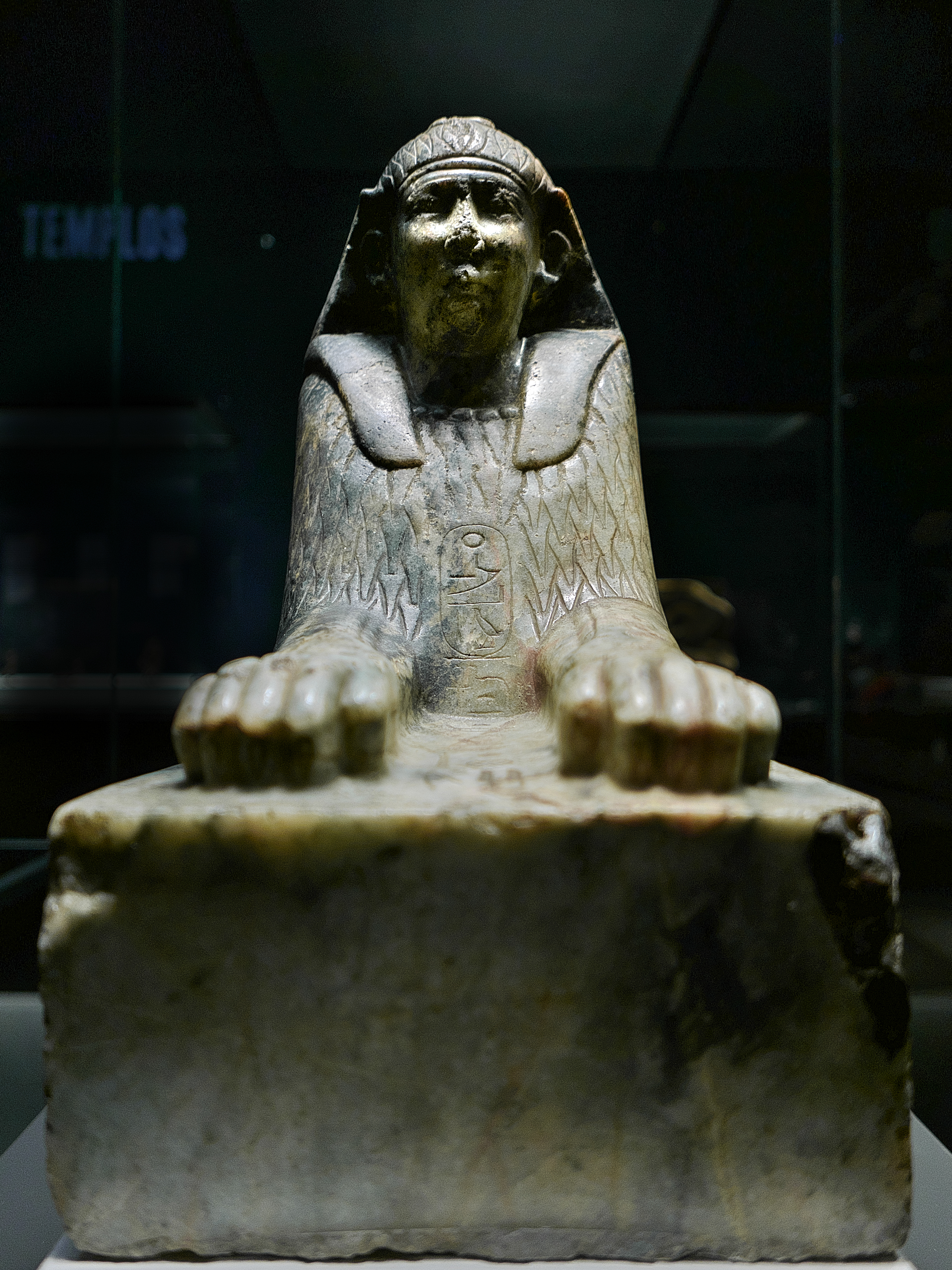
Small gneiss sphinx inscribed with the name of Amenemhat IV that was reworked in Ptolemaic times, now on display at the British Museum.

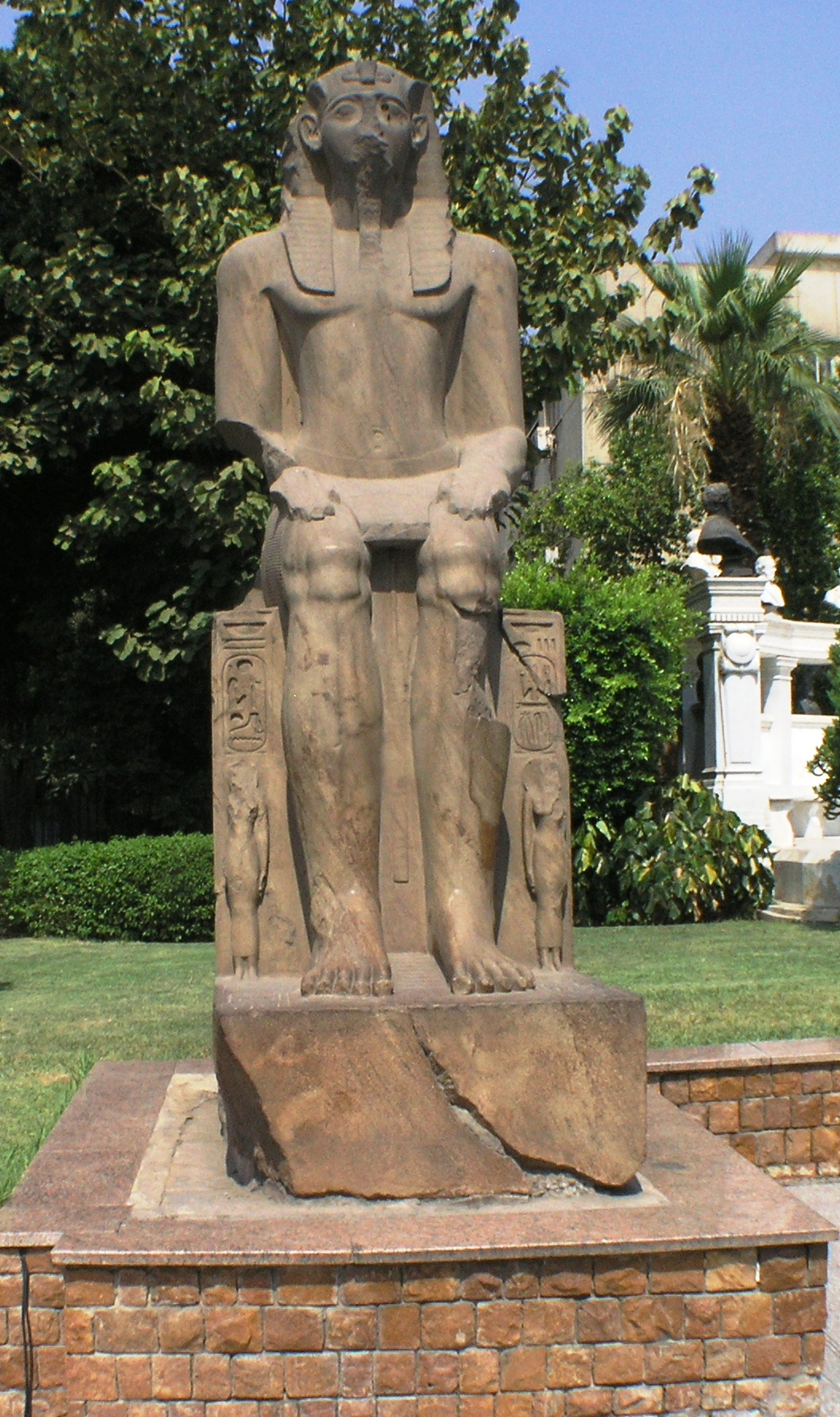
Statue of an Middle Kingdom pharaoh, possibly Amenemhat IV, from Herakleopolis Magna that was recarved and reinscribed for Ramesses II, now in the garden of the Egyptian Museum

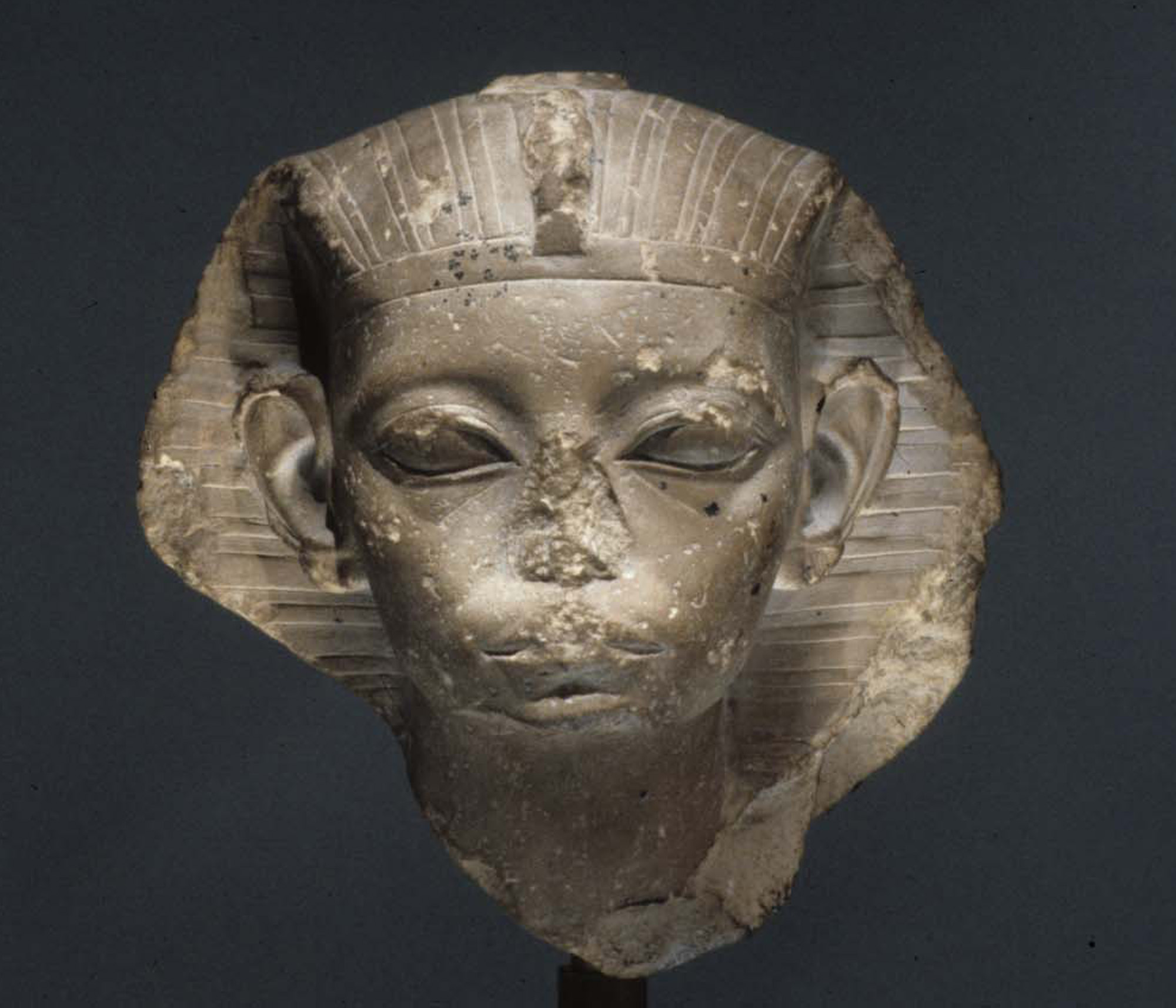
The head of an undetermined Twelfth Dynasty king (MET 08.200.2), perhaps of Amenemhat IV or Sobekneferu

== Royal Court ==
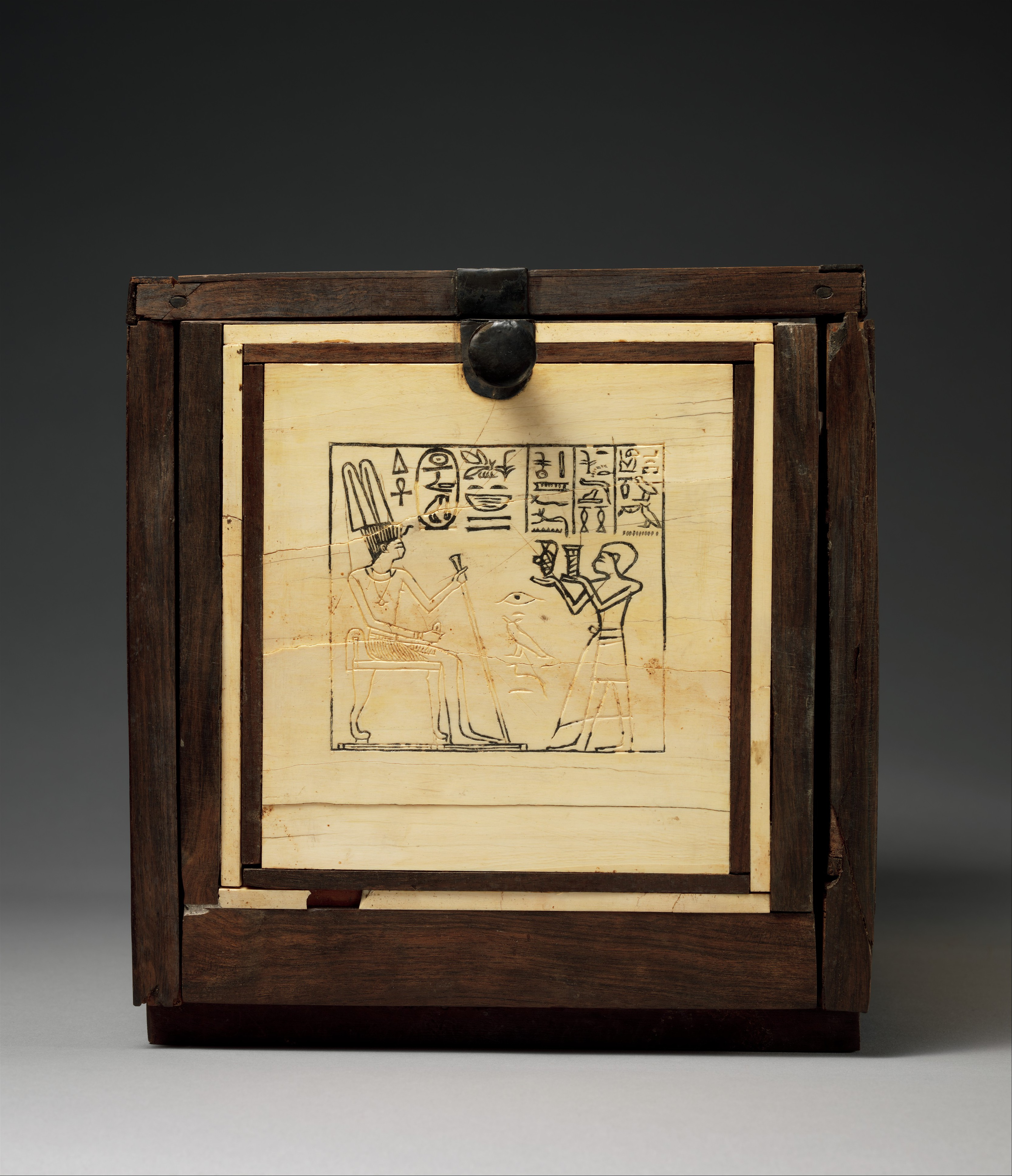
Cosmetic Box (front) of the Royal Butler Kemeni with cartouche of Amenemhat IV (Met Museum)

- Sahathor (assistant treasurer) led an expedition to the amethyst mine in the Wadi el-Hudi in Year 2 of Amenemhat IV.
- Djedy (royal scribe) led an expedition to the Land of Punt in Year 8 of Amenemhat IV.
- Kemeni (royal butler) known from a cosmetic box.
- Ptahhotep (expedition leader) known from stela at Berenice.

== Death ==
=== Pyramid ===
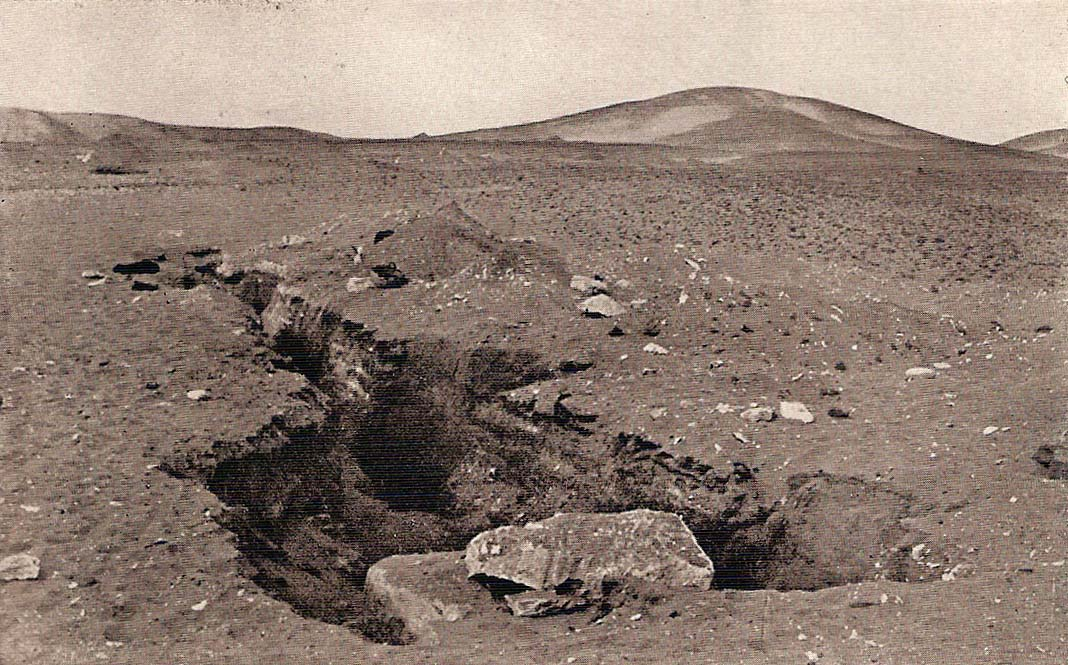
The remains of the Southern Mazghuna pyramid, possibly Amenemhat IV's tomb

The tomb of Amenemhat IV has not been identified. It is likely he built his pyramid near those of his predecessors. Some pyramid remains have been connected to Amenemhat IV.

[1] He often is associated with the ruined Southern Mazghuna pyramid. No inscriptions have been found within the pyramid to determine the identity of its owner, but its architectural similarity with the second pyramid of Amenemhat III at Hawara has led Egyptologists to date the pyramid to the late Twelfth Dynasty or early Thirteenth Dynasty. Less likely, Amenemhat IV could have been interred in Amenemhat III's first pyramid in Dahshur, since his name has been found on an inscription in the mortuary temple.

[2] At Dahshur, next to the pyramid of Amenemhat II, the remains of another pyramid dating to the Middle Kingdom were discovered during building work. The pyramid has not yet been excavated, but a fragment inscribed with the royal name "Amenemhat" has been unearthed. It is possible that this pyramid belongs to Amenemhat IV, although there are also kings of the Thirteenth Dynasty that bore the name Amenemhat and who could have built the pyramid. Alternatively, the relief fragment could have originated at the nearby pyramid of Amenemhat II.

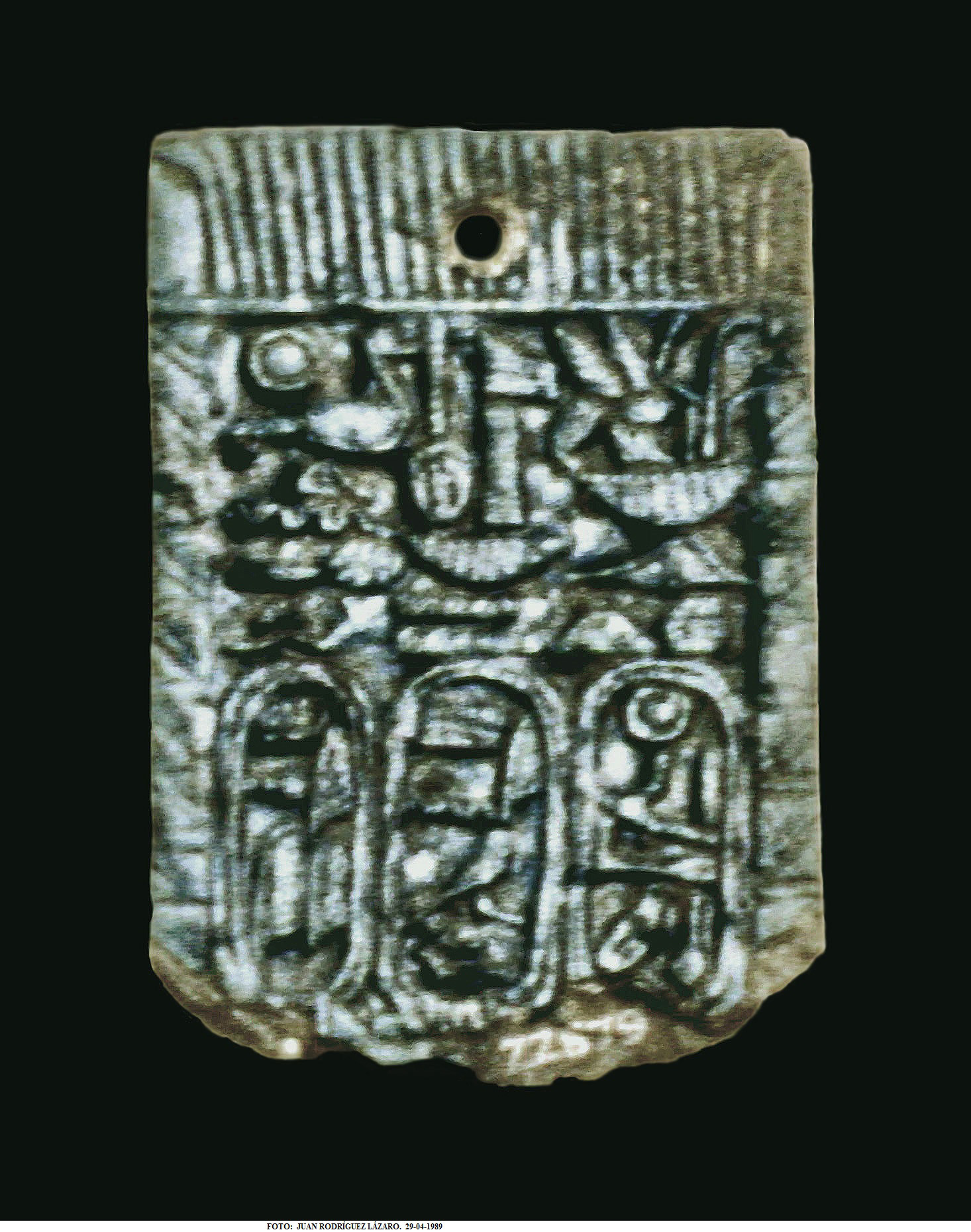
Plaquette mentioning Amenemhat IV and his son the prince Ameny. London. British Museum 22879.

== Theories ==
=== Legacy ===
Less than half a decade after Amenemhat IV's death, the Twelfth Dynasty came to an end and was replaced by the much weaker Thirteenth Dynasty. Although the first two rulers of this new dynasty may have been sons of Amenemhat IV, political instability quickly became prevalent and kings rarely ruled beyond a couple of years. The influx of Asiatic immigrants in the Nile Delta that had started during the reigns of Amenemhat IV's predecessor accelerated under his own reign, becoming completely unchecked. Under the Thirteenth Dynasty, the Asiatic population of the Delta founded an independent kingdom ruled by kings of Canaanite descent, forming the Fourteenth Dynasty that reigned from Avaris. Approximately 80 years after the reign of Amenemhat IV, "the administration [of the Egyptian state] seems to have completely collapsed", marking the start of the Second Intermediate Period.

=== Dating ===
Various authors provide different estimates for his reign: AE Chronology (1772–1764), v. Beckerath (1807–1798), Shaw (1786–1777), Dodson (1798–1785), Arnold (1799–1787), Malek (1814–1805), Grimal (1797–1790), Franke (1773–1764), Redford (1798–1790).

== See also ==
- List of pharaohs

== Bibliography ==
- Dodson, Aidan, and Dyan Hilton, 2004: The Complete Royal Families of Ancient Egypt, London: Thames & Hudson.
- Grajetzki, Wolfram 2010: The Middle Kingdom of Ancient Egypt: History, Archaeology and Society, Bloomsbury 3PL, ISBN 978-0-7156-3435-6
- Matzker, Ingo 1986: Die letzten Könige der 12. Dynastie, Europäische Hochschulschriften. Reihe III, Geschichte und ihre Hilfswissenschaften. Frankfurt, Bern, New York: Lang.
- Pignattari, Stefania 2018: Amenemhat IV and the end of the Twelfth Dynasty, BAR Publishing, ISBN 978-1-4073-1635-2
- Ryholt, Kim S. B. 1997: The Political Situation in Egypt during the Second Intermediate Period c. 1800–1500 BC, Copenhagen: Museum Tusculanum Press.
- Shaw, Ian, and Paul Nicholson 1995: The Dictionary of Ancient Egypt, Harry N. Abrams, Inc. Publishers.
- Siesse, Julien 2019: La XIIIe Dynasties: Histoire de la fin du Moyen Empire égyptien, Paris: Sorbonne.
- Waddell, W.G., (transl.) 1940: Manetho, Cambridge, MA: Loeb Classical Library.

Preceded by Amenemhat III	Pharaoh of Egypt; Twelfth Dynasty	Succeeded by Sobekneferu
