= Kom El Sultan =

Archaeological site in Egypt

Coordinates: 26.1924°N 31.9114°E

The area now known as Kom El Sultan is located in north Abydos, in Egypt. The most prominent feature of the area is the remains of a great mud brick temenos wall enclosing roughly 76,800 square meters of land. The southwest wall is the only wall which remains fully intact (although some of the wall faces have broken), stretching for 327 meters with an average thickness of 7 meters, and preserved, in places, up to a height of more than 5 meters above ground level. The original height is unknown. In the early days of excavation here, only the enclosed area in the northwest corner of the temenos wall was referred to as Kom el-Sultan, however today this term has come to include the entire area confined by the temenos wall, which contained the ancient town and temple site of Abydos.

Mariette, Garstang, Petrie, Adams, and Marlar have all conducted excavations within Kom el-Sultan. Mariette worked in the northwest corner of the temenos wall, which was the original Kom el-Sultan. Garstang conducted “cursory excavation" in the area for survey and mapping purposes only. Petrie excavated in the local northern section where he found the only known statue of Khufu as well as architecture which he interpreted as phases of the Osiris temple (from the Early Dynastic Period to the 26th Dynasty). Adams uncovered part of the Old Kingdom and First Intermediate Period town site in the local southern section; and, Marlar excavated the Osiris temple proper, discovering both a New Kingdom and 30th Dynasty phases of the temple.
