= Abydos, Egypt =

City in ancient Egypt

Abydos
- أبيدو (Arabic)
- Ⲉⲃⲱⲧ; Abedju
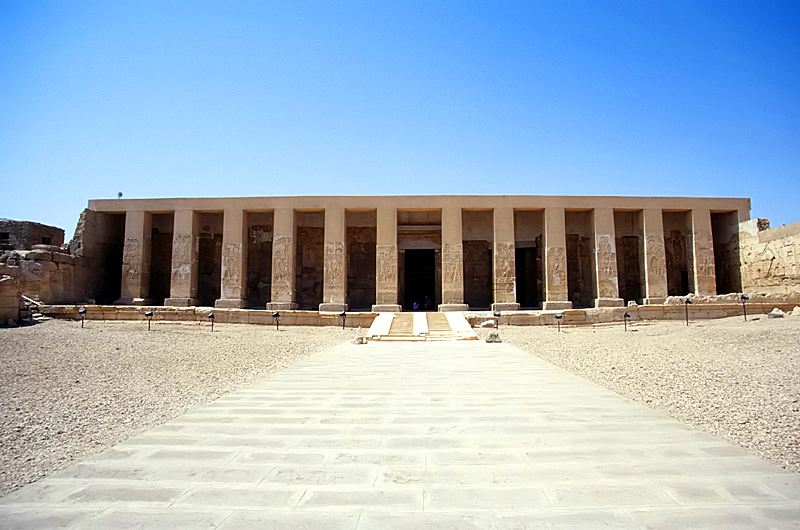
- Façade of the Temple of Seti I in Abydos, built c. 1300 BCE

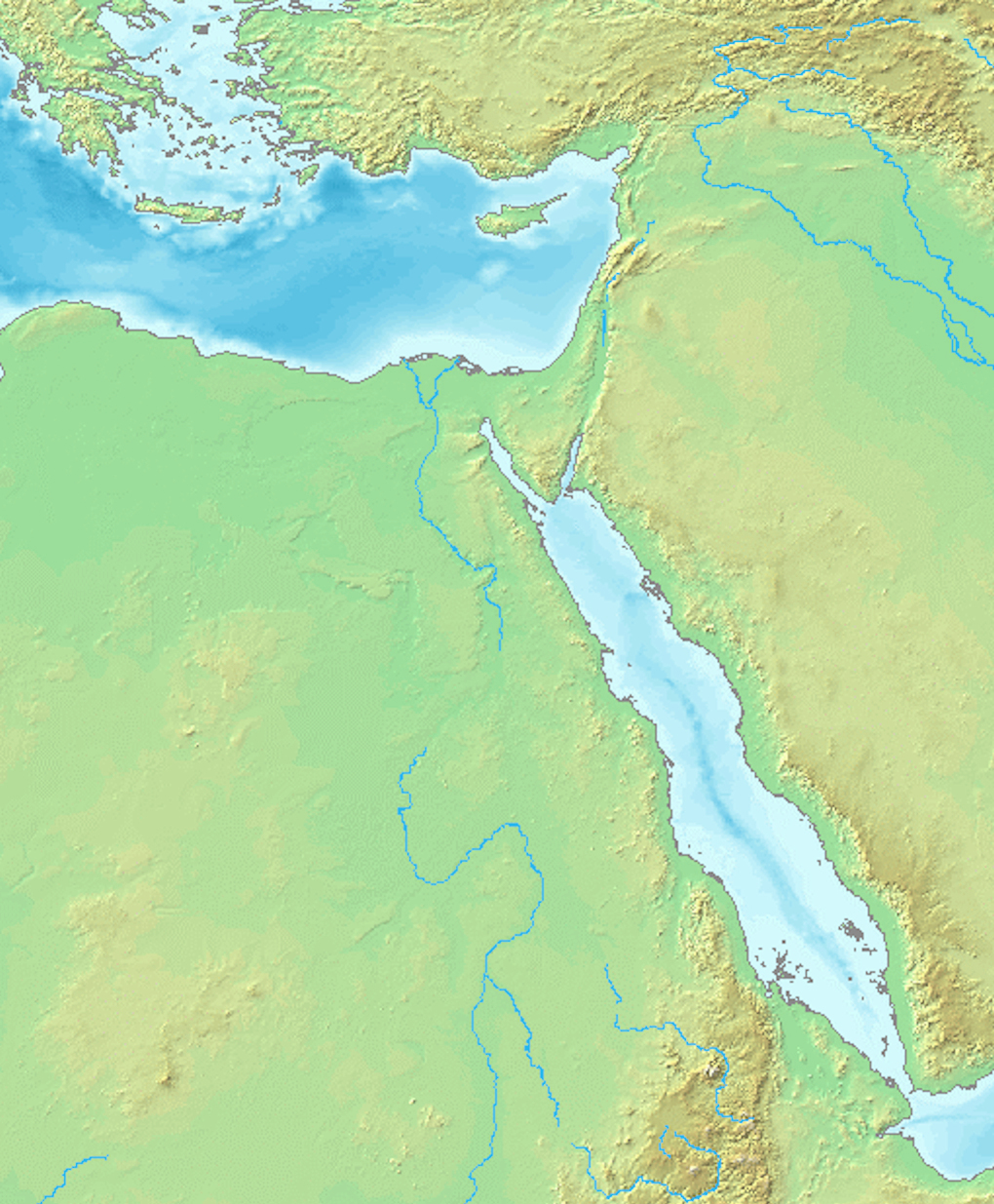
- Location within Egypt Location within Northeast Africa
- 26°11′06″N 31°55′08″E
- Type: Settlement
- Periods: First Dynasty to Thirtieth Dynasty
- Location: El-Balyana, Sohag Governorate, Egypt
- Region: Upper Egypt

Abydos /əˈbaɪdɒs/ (Arabic: أبيدوس, romanized: Abīdūs or Arabic: افود, romanized: Afūd; Sahidic Coptic: Ⲉⲃⲱⲧ Ebōt) was one of the oldest cities of ancient Egypt, and also of the eighth nome in Upper Egypt. It is located about 11 kilometres (6.8 miles) west of the Nile at latitude 26° 10' N, near the modern Egyptian towns of El Araba El Madfuna and El Balyana. In the ancient Egyptian language, the city was called Abedju (ꜣbḏw or AbDw)(Arabic Abdu عبد-و). The English name Abydos comes from the Greek Ἄβυδος, a name borrowed by Greek geographers from the unrelated city of Abydos on the Hellespont.

Considered one of the most important archaeological sites in Egypt, the sacred city of Abydos was the site of many ancient temples, including Umm el-Qa'ab, a royal necropolis where early pharaohs were entombed. These tombs began to be seen as extremely significant burials and in later times it became desirable to be buried in the area, leading to the growth of the town's importance as a cult site.

Today, Abydos is notable for the memorial temple of Seti I, which contains an inscription from the Nineteenth Dynasty known to the modern world as the Abydos King List. This is a chronological list showing cartouches of most dynastic pharaohs of Egypt from Menes until Seti I's father, Ramesses I. It is also notable for the Abydos graffiti, ancient Phoenician and Aramaic graffiti found on the walls of the Temple of Seti I.

The Great Temple and most of the ancient town are buried under the modern buildings to the north of the Seti temple. Many of the original structures and the artifacts within them are considered irretrievable and lost; many may have been destroyed by the new construction.

== History ==
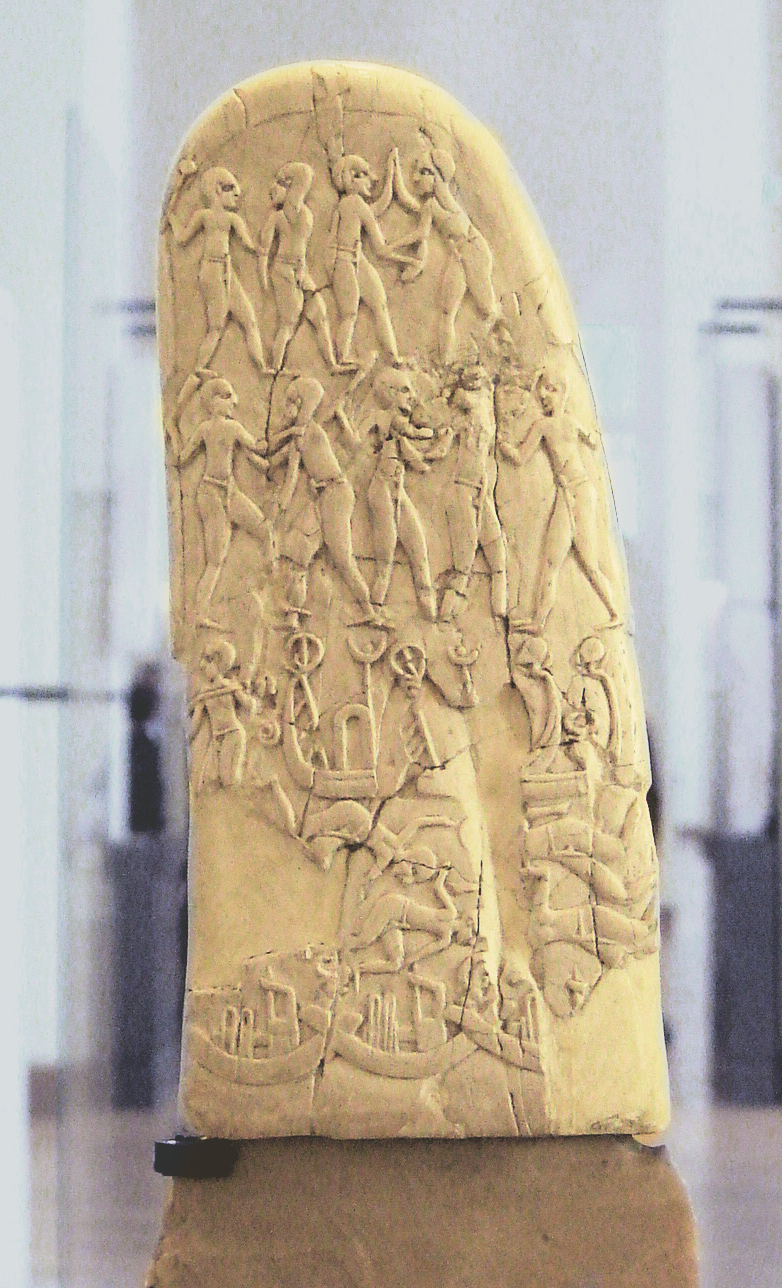
Possible illustration of the conflict between Abydos and Nekhen, on the Gebel el-Arak Knife, Louvre Museum, 3300–3200 BCE.

Ab b Dw O49
Name of Abydos
in hieroglyphs

Most of Upper Egypt became unified under rulers from Abydos during the Naqada III period (3200–3000 BCE), at the expense of rival cities such as Nekhen. The conflicts leading to the supremacy of Abydos may appear on numerous reliefs of the Naqada II period, such as the Gebel el-Arak Knife, or the frieze of Tomb 100 at Hierakonpolis.

Tombs and at least one temple of rulers of the Predynastic period have been found at Umm El Qa'ab including that of Narmer, dating to c. 3100 BCE. The temple and town continued to be rebuilt at intervals down to the times of the Thirtieth Dynasty, and the cemetery was in continuous use.

The pharaohs of the First Dynasty were buried in Abydos, including Narmer, who is regarded as the founder of the First Dynasty, and his successor, Aha. It was in this time period that the Abydos boats were constructed. Some pharaohs of the Second Dynasty were also buried in Abydos. The temple was renewed and enlarged by these pharaohs as well. Funerary enclosures, misinterpreted in modern times as great 'forts', were built on the desert behind the town by three kings of the Second Dynasty; the most complete is that of Khasekhemwy, the Shunet El Zebib.

King Khasekhemwy fort

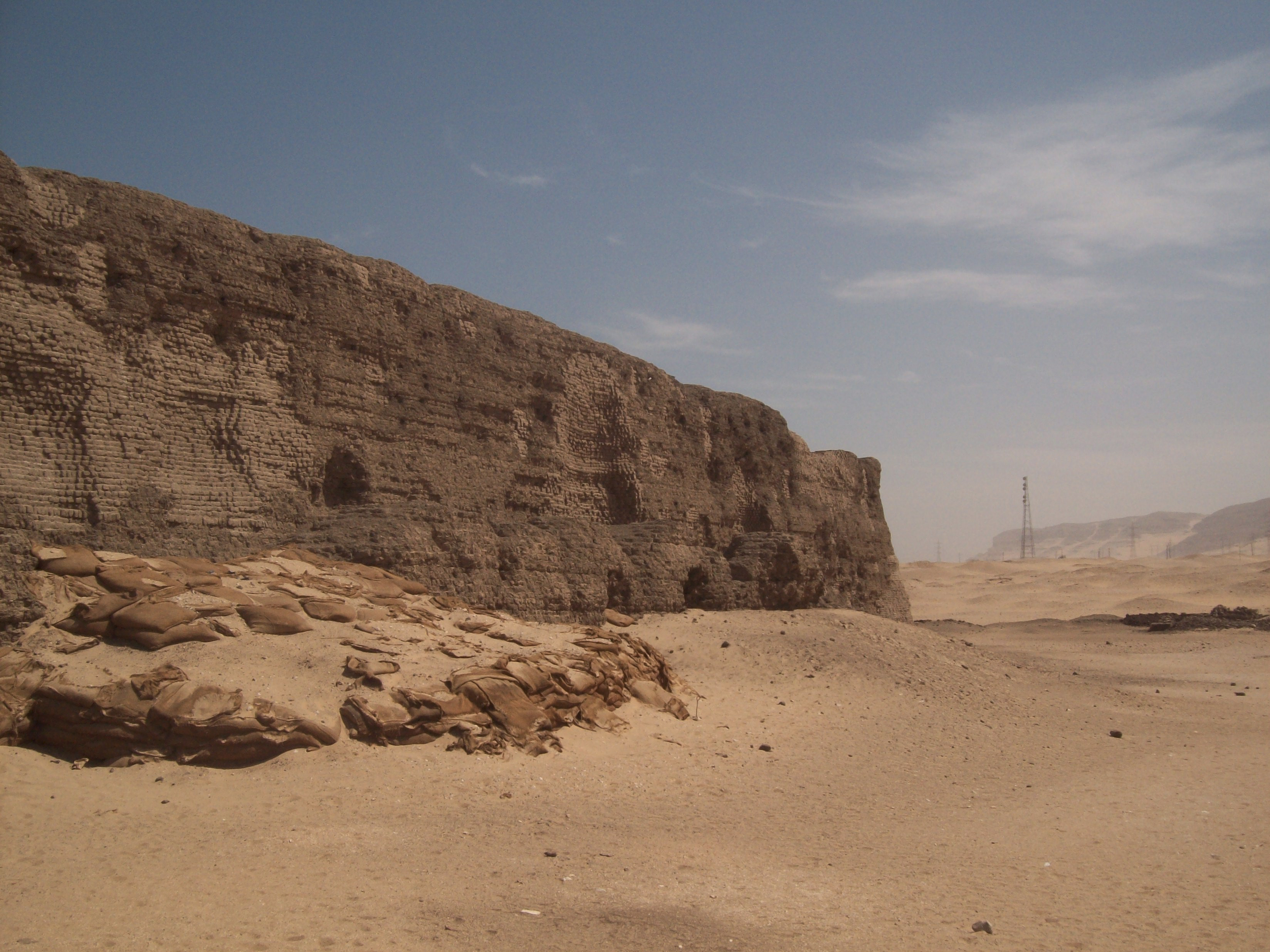
King Khasekhemwy "fort" in Abydos. c. 2700 BCE

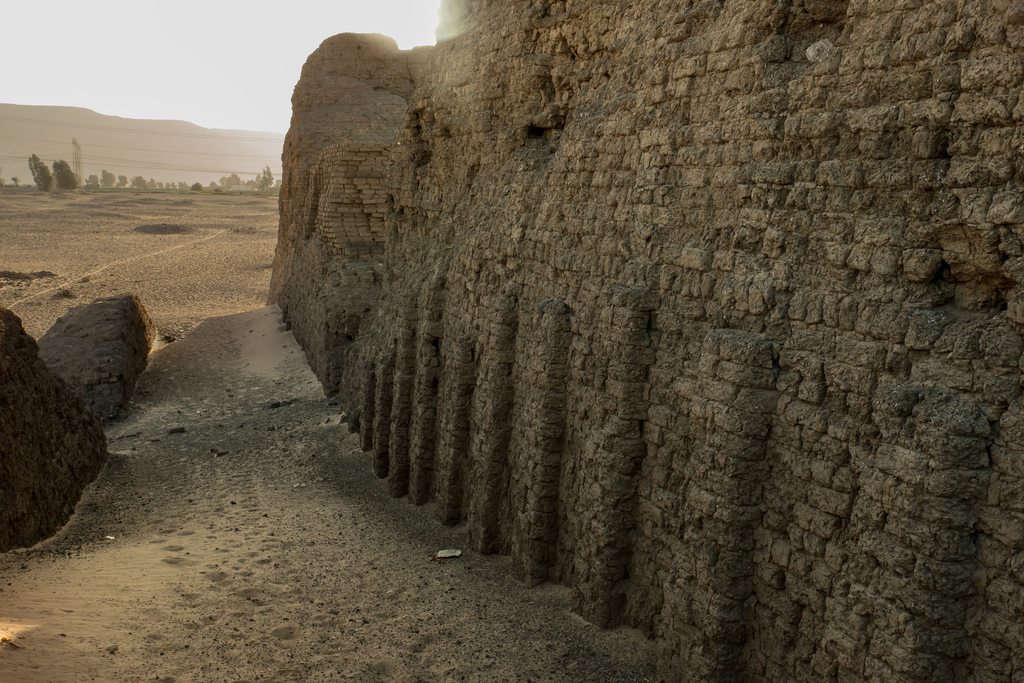
King Khasekhemwy "fort" in Abydos.

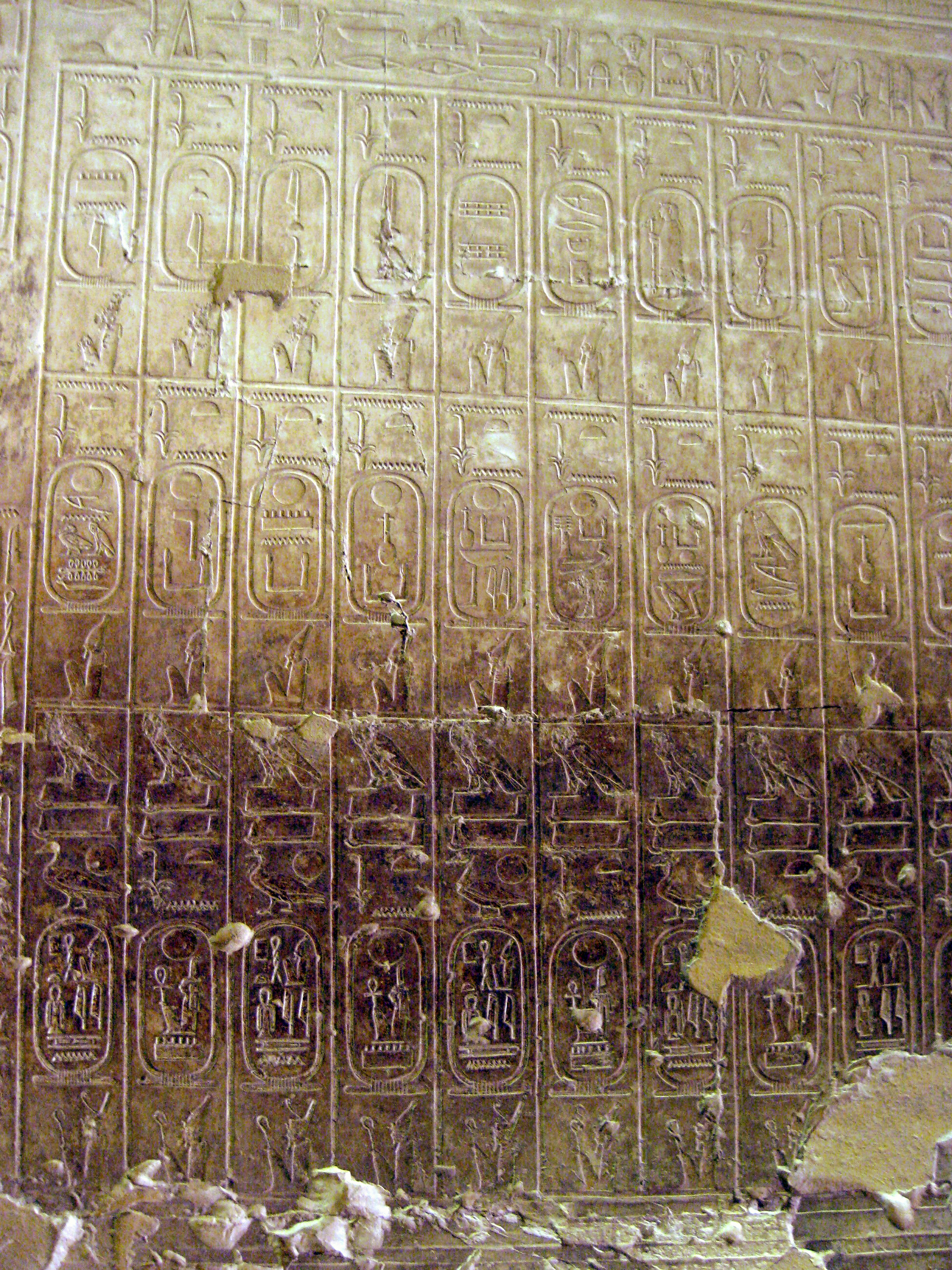
Part of the Abydos King List

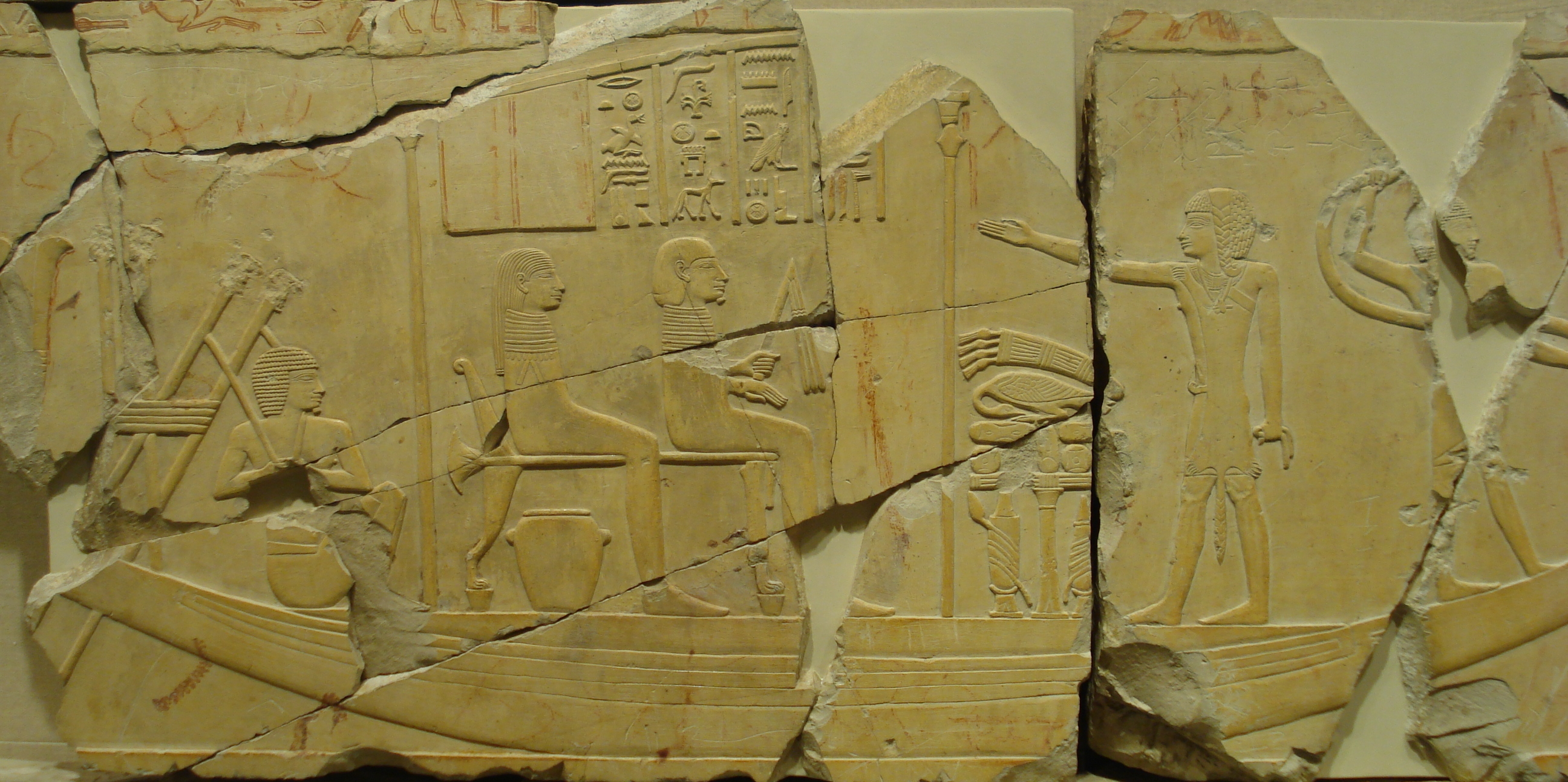
Tomb relief depicting the vizier Nespeqashuty and his wife, KetjKetj, making the journey of the dead to the holy city of Abydos – from Deir el-Bahri, Late Period, Twenty-sixth Dynasty of Egypt, reign of Psammetichus I

From the Fifth Dynasty, the deity Khentiamentiu, foremost of the Westerners, came to be seen as a manifestation of the dead pharaoh in the underworld. Pepi I (Sixth Dynasty) constructed a funerary chapel which evolved over the years into the Great Temple of Osiris, the ruins of which still exist within the town enclosure. Abydos became the centre of the worship of the Isis and Osiris cult.

During the First Intermediate Period, the principal deity of the area, Khentiamentiu, began to be seen as an aspect of Osiris, and the deities gradually merged and came to be regarded as one. Khentiamentiu's name became an epithet of Osiris. King Mentuhotep II was the first to build a royal chapel. In the Twelfth Dynasty a gigantic tomb was cut into the rock by Senusret III. Associated with this tomb was a cenotaph, a cult temple and a small town known as "Wah-Sut", that was used by the workers for these structures. Next to the cenotaph at least two kings of the Thirteenth Dynasty were buried (in tombs S9 and S10) as well as some rulers of the Second Intermediate Period, such as Senebkay. An indigenous line of kings, the Abydos Dynasty, may have ruled the region from Abydos at the time.

New construction during the Eighteenth Dynasty began with a large chapel of Ahmose I. The Pyramid of Ahmose I was also constructed at Abydos—the only pyramid in the area; very little of it remains today.

Thutmose III built a far larger temple, about 130 ft × 200 ft (40 m × 61 m). He also made a processional way leading past the side of the temple to the cemetery beyond, featuring a great gateway of granite.

Seti I, during the Nineteenth Dynasty, founded a temple to the south of the town in honor of the ancestral pharaohs of the early dynasties; this was finished by Ramesses II, who also built a lesser temple of his own. Merneptah added the Osireion, just to the north of the temple of Seti.

Ahmose II in the Twenty-sixth Dynasty rebuilt the temple again, and placed in it a large monolith shrine of red granite, finely wrought. The foundations of the successive temples were comprised within approximately 18 ft (5.5 m). depth of the ruins discovered in modern times; these needed the closest examination to discriminate the various buildings, and were recorded by more than 4,000 measurements and 1,000 levellings.

The last building added was a new temple of Nectanebo I, built in the Thirtieth Dynasty. From the Ptolemaic times of the Greek occupancy of Egypt, that began three hundred years before the Roman occupancy that followed, the structures began to decay and no later works are known.

=== Cult centre ===
From earliest times, Abydos was a cult centre, first of the local deity, Khentiamentiu, and from the end of the Old Kingdom, the rising cult of Osiris. A tradition developed that the Early Dynastic cemetery was the burial place of Osiris and the tomb of Djer was reinterpreted as that of Osiris.

Decorations in tombs throughout Egypt, such as the one displayed to the right, record pilgrimages to Abydos by wealthy families.

=== Great Osiris Temple ===
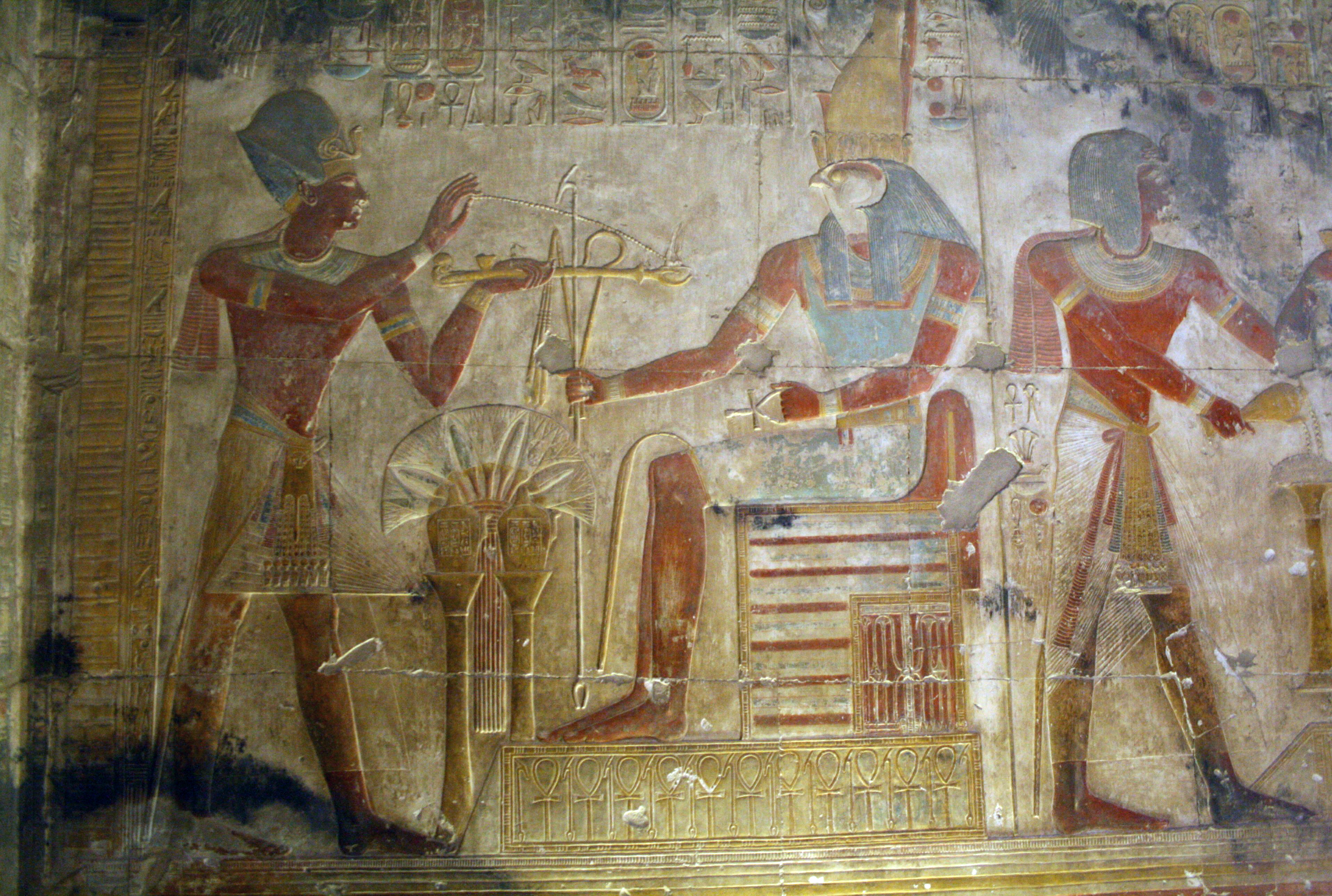
Panel from the Osiris temple: Horus presents royal regalia to a worshipping Seti I.

From the First Dynasty to the Twenty-sixth Dynasty, nine or ten temples were successively built on one site at Abydos. The first was an enclosure, about 30 ft × 50 ft (9.1 m × 15.2 m), enclosed by a thin wall of unbaked bricks. Incorporating one wall of this first structure, the second temple of about 40 ft (12 m) square was built with walls about 10 ft (3.0 m) thick. An outer temenos (enclosure) wall surrounded the grounds. This outer wall was made wider some time around the Second or Third Dynasty. The old temple entirely vanished in the Fourth Dynasty, and a smaller building was erected behind it, enclosing a wide hearth of black ashes. Pottery models of offerings are found in these ashes and were probably the substitutes for live sacrifices decreed by Khufu (or Cheops) in his temple reforms.

This was done at an unknown point in time but the subsequent discovery of the chamber where they were stored produced the high-quality ivories and the glazed statues that from the first dynasty. A vase of Menes with purple hieroglyphs inlaid into a green glaze and tiles with relief figures are the most important pieces found. The Khufu Statuette in ivory, found in the stone chamber of the temple, gives the only portrait of the pharaoh.

The temple was entirely rebuilt on a larger scale by Pepi I in the Sixth Dynasty. He placed a great stone gateway to the temenos, an outer wall and gateway, with a colonnade between the gates. His temple was about 40 ft × 50 ft (12 m × 15 m) inside, with stone gateways front and back, showing that it was of the processional type. In the Eleventh Dynasty Mentuhotep II added a colonnade and altars. Soon after, Mentuhotep III entirely rebuilt the temple, laying a stone pavement over the area, about 45 ft (14 m) square. He also added subsidiary chambers. Soon thereafter, in the Twelfth Dynasty, Senusret I laid massive foundations of stone over the pavement of his predecessor. A great temenos was laid out enclosing a much larger area and the new temple itself was about three times the earlier size.

=== Brewery ===
On 14 February 2021, Egyptian and American archaeologists discovered what could be the oldest brewery in the world dating from around 3100 BCE at the reign of King Narmer. Dr. Matthew Adams, one of the leaders of the mission, stated that it was used to make beer for royal rituals.

=== Portal Temple ===
At the back of the main Oisris temple, outside of the enclosure well, near the cemetery areas, there was the Portal Temple that was built or at least finished by Ramses II. Only the front part with four columns of the temple is preserved.

== Main sites ==
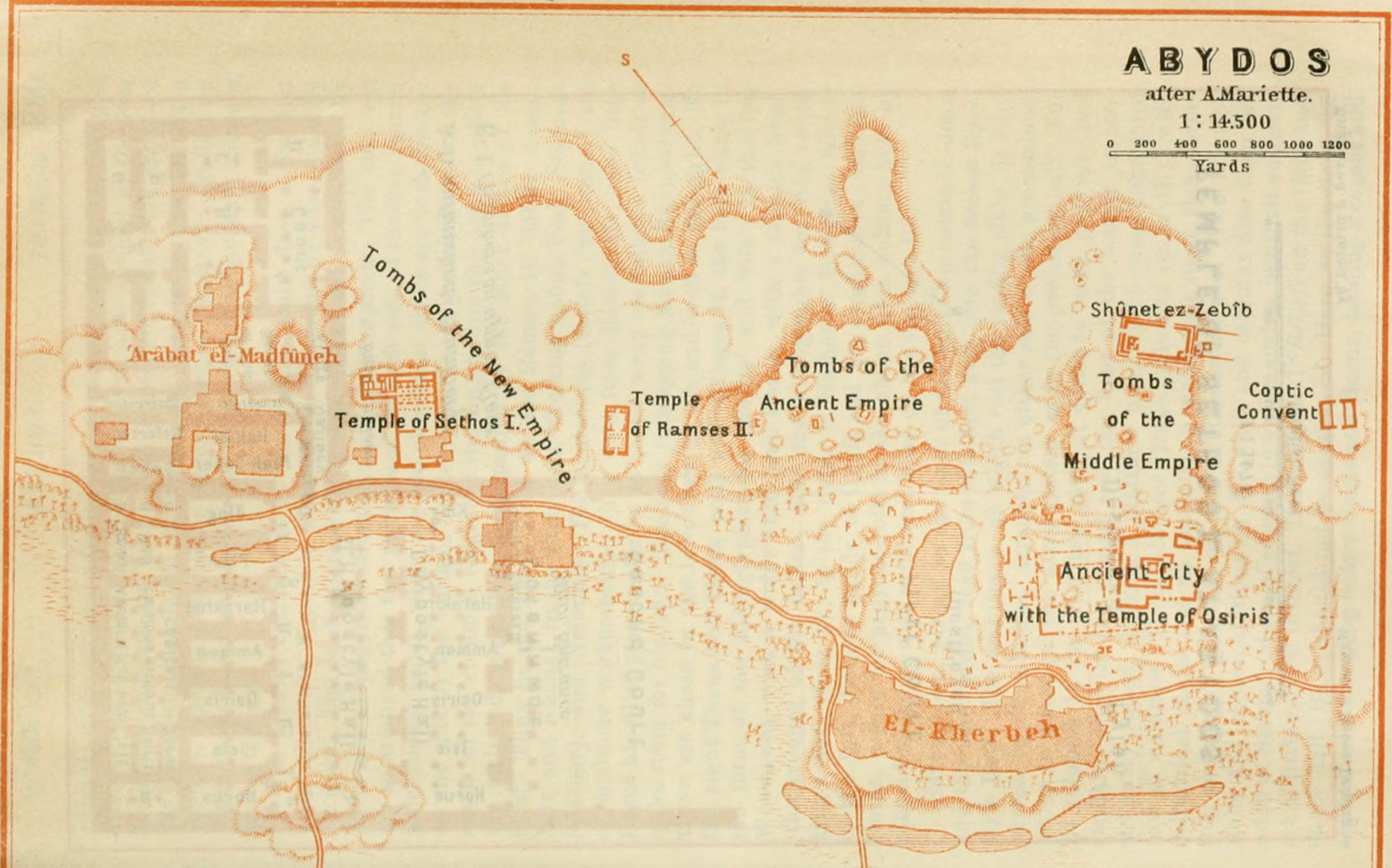
Plan of Abydos

=== Seti I Temple ===
The temple of Seti I was built on entirely new ground half a mile to the south of the long series of temples just described. This surviving building is best known as the Great Temple of Abydos, being nearly complete and an impressive sight. A principal purpose of the temple was to serve as a memorial to king Seti I, as well as to show reverence for the early pharaohs, which is incorporated within as part of the "Rite of the Ancestors".

The long list of the pharaohs of the principal dynasties—recognized by Seti—are carved on a wall and known as the "Abydos King List" (showing the cartouche name of many dynastic pharaohs of Egypt from the first, Narmer or Menes, until Seti's time). There were significant names deliberately left off of the list. So rare, as an almost complete list of pharaoh names, the Table of Abydos, rediscovered by William John Bankes, has been called the "Rosetta Stone" of Egyptian archaeology, analogous to the Rosetta Stone for Egyptian writing, beyond the Narmer Palette.

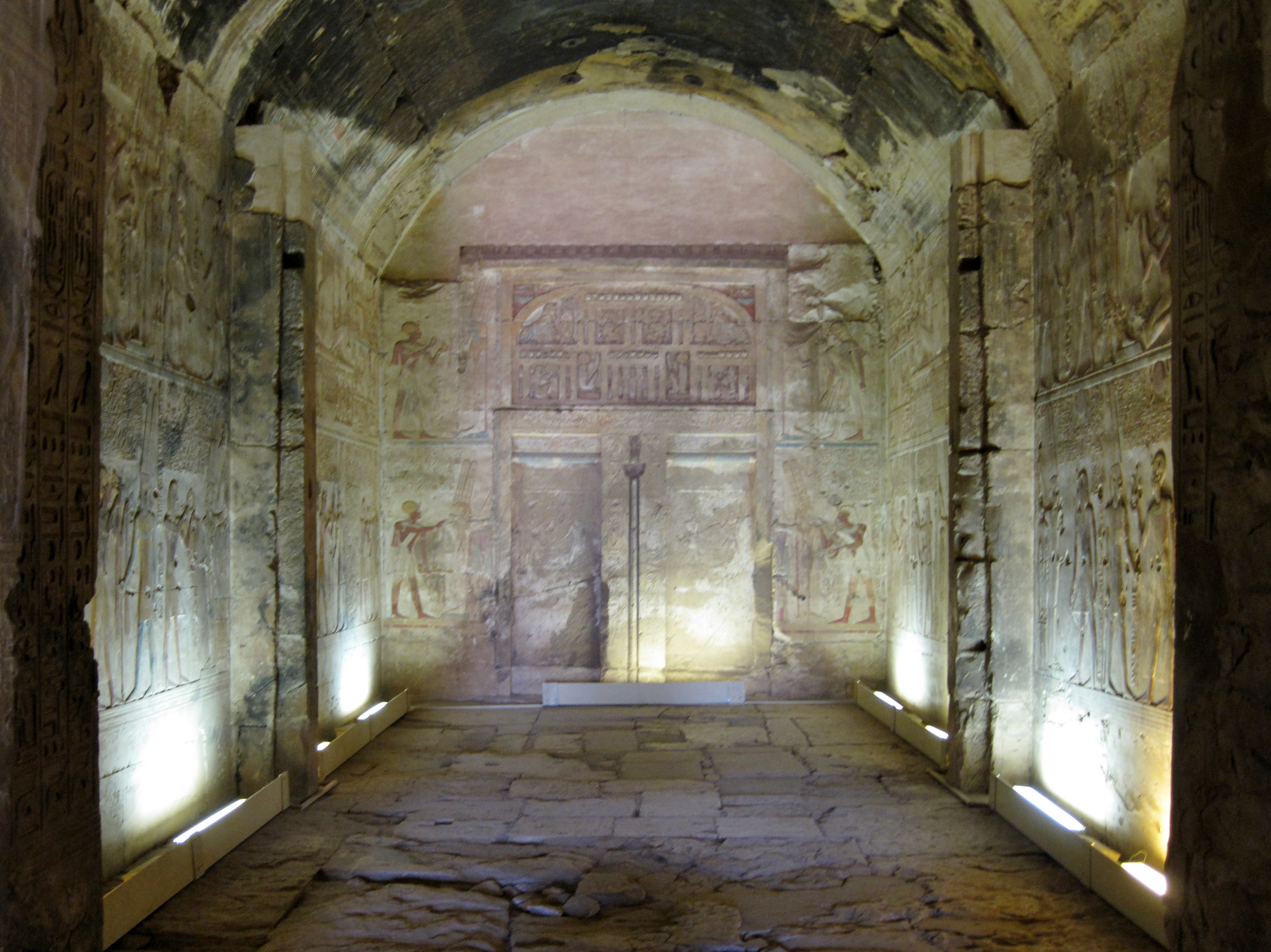
The Chapel of Amun

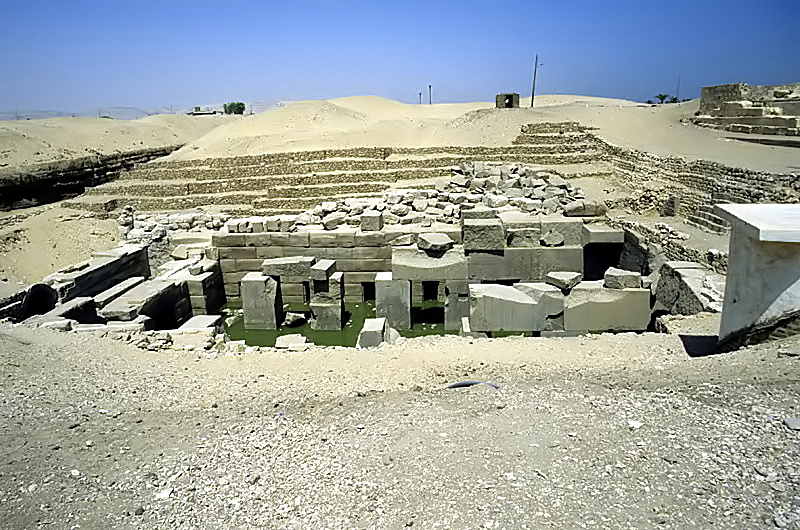
The Osireion at the rear of the temple

There were also seven chapels built for the worship of the pharaoh and principal deities. These included three chapels for the "state" deities Ptah, Re-Horakhty, and (centrally positioned) Amun and the challenge for the Abydos triad of Osiris, Isis and Horus. The rites recorded in the deity chapels represent the first complete form known of the Daily Ritual, which was performed daily in temples across Egypt throughout the pharaonic period. At the back of the temple is an enigmatic structure known as the Osireion, which served as a cenotaph for Seti-Osiris, and is thought to be connected with the worship of Osiris as an "Osiris tomb". It is possible that from those chambers was led out the great Hypogeum for the celebration of the Osiris mysteries, built by Merenptah. The temple was originally 550 ft (170 m) long, but the forecourts are scarcely recognizable, and the part still in good condition is about 250 ft (76 m) long and 350 ft (110 m) wide, including the wing at the side. Magazines for food and offerings storage were built to either side of the forecourts, as well as a small palace for the king and his retinue, to the southeast of the first forecourt (Ghazouli, The Palace and Magazines Attached to the Temple of Sety I at Abydos and the Facade of This Temple. ASAE 58 (1959)).

Except for the list of pharaohs and a panegyric on Ramesses II, the subjects are not historical, but religious in nature, dedicated to the transformation of the king after his death. The temple reliefs are celebrated for their delicacy and artistic refinement, utilizing both the archaism of earlier dynasties with the vibrancy of late 18th Dynasty reliefs. The sculptures had been published mostly in hand copy, not facsimile, by Auguste Mariette in his Abydos, I. The temple has been partially recorded epigraphically by Amice Calverley and Myrtle Broome in their 4 volume publication of The Temple of King Sethos I at Abydos (1933–1958).

==== King's List ====
In The Gallery of Ancestors, also referred to as The Gallery of the List, one can find the Abydos King List. This list is depicted in low relief, carved under the reign of Seti I, and it shows Seti and Ramesses making offerings to their royal ancestors. These royal ancestors are the past kings of Egypt. Notably, some rulers, like the 15th Dynasty Hyksos that ruled Egypt during the Second Intermediate Period 1650-1550 BCE and the reign of the 18th Dynasty heretic Akhenaten of the New Kingdom 1550–1069, were omitted from the list, possibly due to being associated with periods of internal weakness and divisions. The Gallery of Ancestors led into the storerooms and the desert behind the temple.

==== Osireion ====
The Osirion or Osireon, meaning "Menmaatre beneficial to Osiris" sometimes called the Osiris Complex, is an ancient Egyptian temple. It is located to the rear of the temple of Seti I. It is an integral part of Seti I's funeral complex and is built to resemble an 18th Dynasty Valley of the Kings tomb. This was possibly used in ritual purposes with the growing of barely that allowed for the symbolic representation of the resurrection of Osiris. Today parts of the Osierion contain water due to the Aswan Dam and rising floodwaters.

The Osireion contains water features that may have been connected to a canal, symbolically standing for the primeval waters and the mound of creation in ancient Egyptian religious beliefs.

==== "Helicopter" hieroglyphs ====
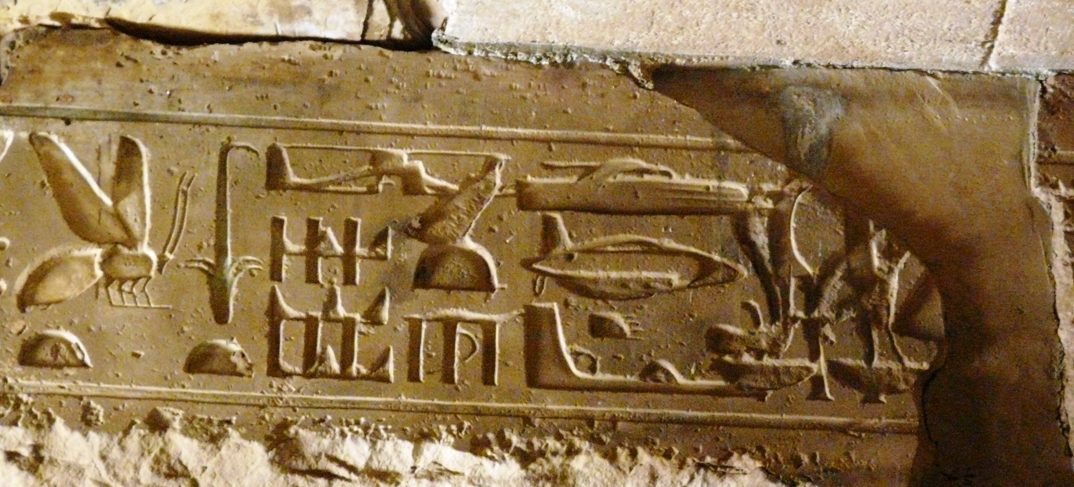
The retouched and eroded hieroglyphs in the Temple of Seti I which have been claimed to represent modern vehicles – a helicopter, a submarine, and a zeppelin or plane.

Some of the hieroglyphs carved over an arch on the site have been interpreted in esoteric and "ufological" circles as depicting modern technology, having been the subject of pyramidology speculation.

The "helicopter" image is the result of carved stone being re-used over time. The initial carving was made during the reign of Seti I and translates as "He who repulses the nine [enemies of Egypt]". This carving was later filled in with plaster and re-carved during the reign of Ramesses II with the title "He who protects Egypt and overthrows the foreign countries". Over time, the plaster has eroded away, leaving both inscriptions partially visible and creating a palimpsest-like effect of overlapping hieroglyphs.

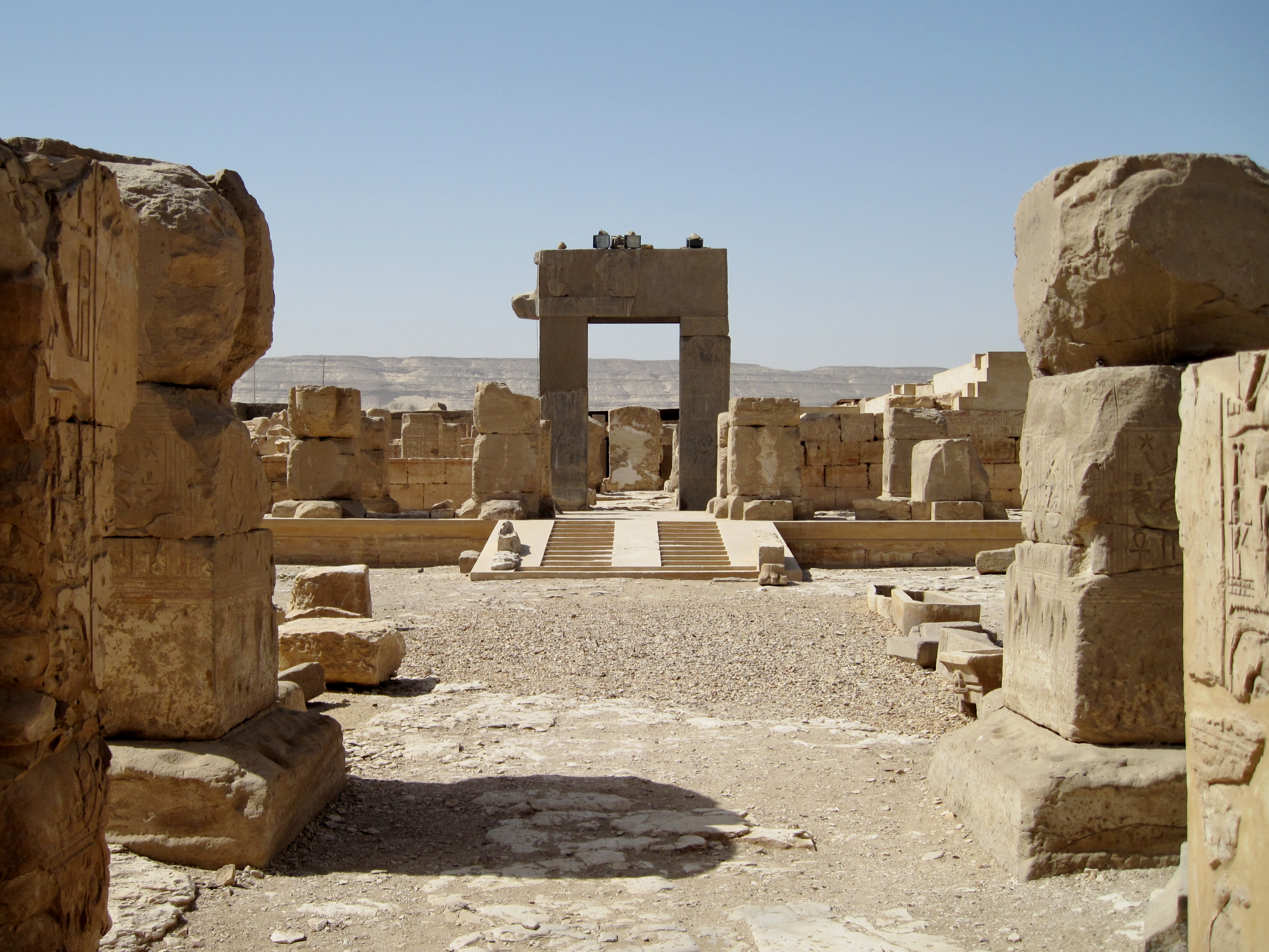
The Temple of Ramesses II

=== Ramesses II temple ===
The adjacent temple of Ramesses II was much smaller and simpler in plan, but it had a fine historical series of scenes around the outside that lauded his achievements, of which the lower parts remain. The outside of the temple was decorated with scenes of the Battle of Kadesh. His list of pharaohs, similar to that of Seti I, formerly stood here; the fragments were removed by the French consul and sold to the British Museum.

==== King's List ====
Inside the temple once stood another Gallery of Ancestors. This list is also depicted in low relief, carved under the reign of Ramesses II, but is more damaged. The surviving fragments were removed by the French consul in 1837 and sold to the British Museum.

=== Umm El Qa'ab ===
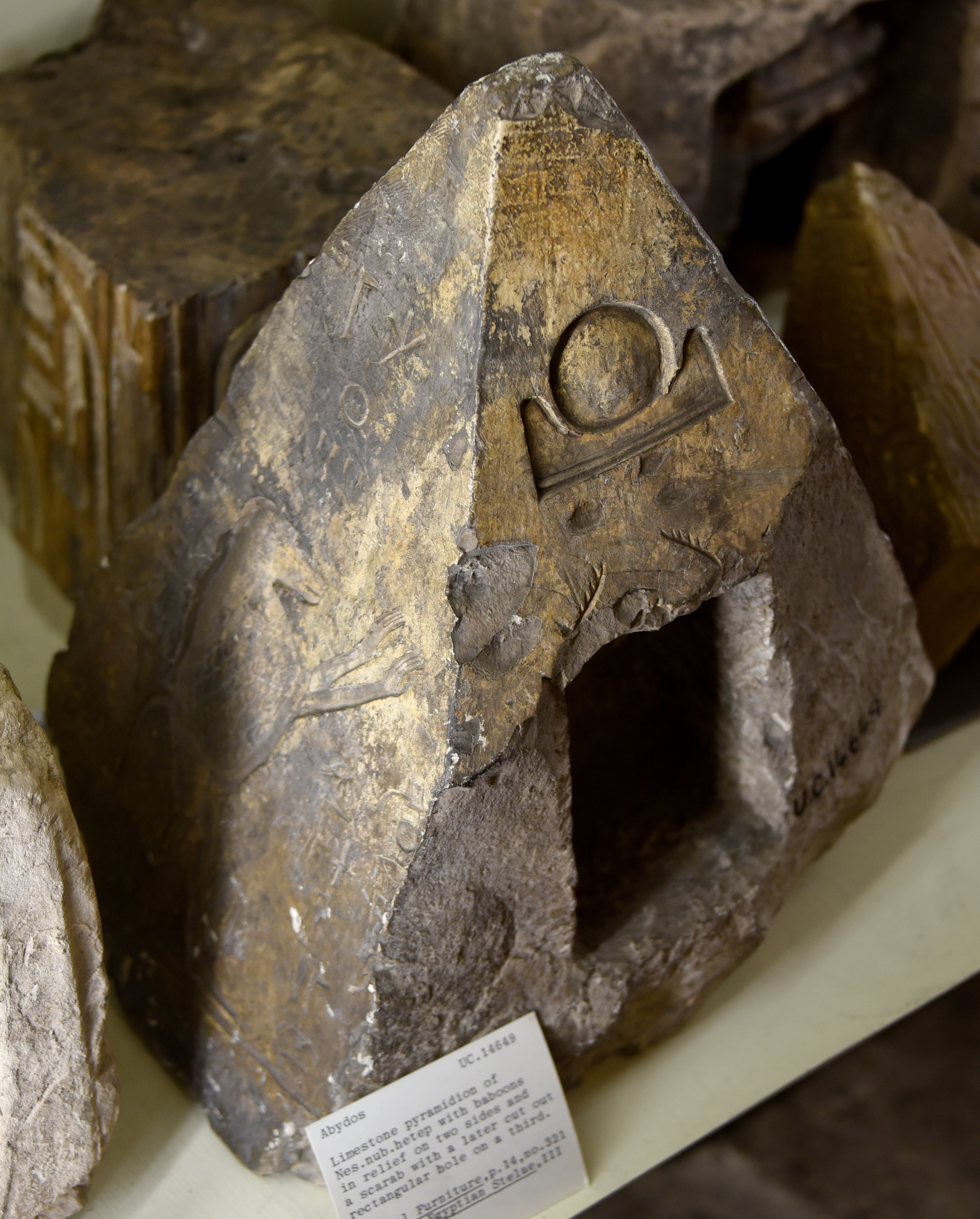
Pyramidion of Nesnubhotep, top of a limestone chapel monument. A scarab and adoring baboons in relief. Dynasty XXVI, Abydos, Egypt. Petrie Museum of Egyptian Archaeology, London

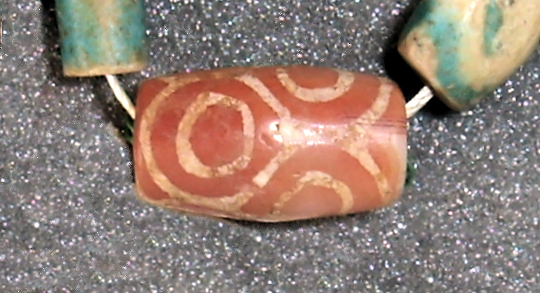
A rare etched carnelian bead found in Abydos, tomb 197, thought to have been imported from the Indus Valley civilisation through Mesopotamia, in an example of Egypt-Mesopotamia relations. Late Middle Kingdom of Egypt. London, Petrie Museum of Egyptian Archaeology, ref. UC30334.

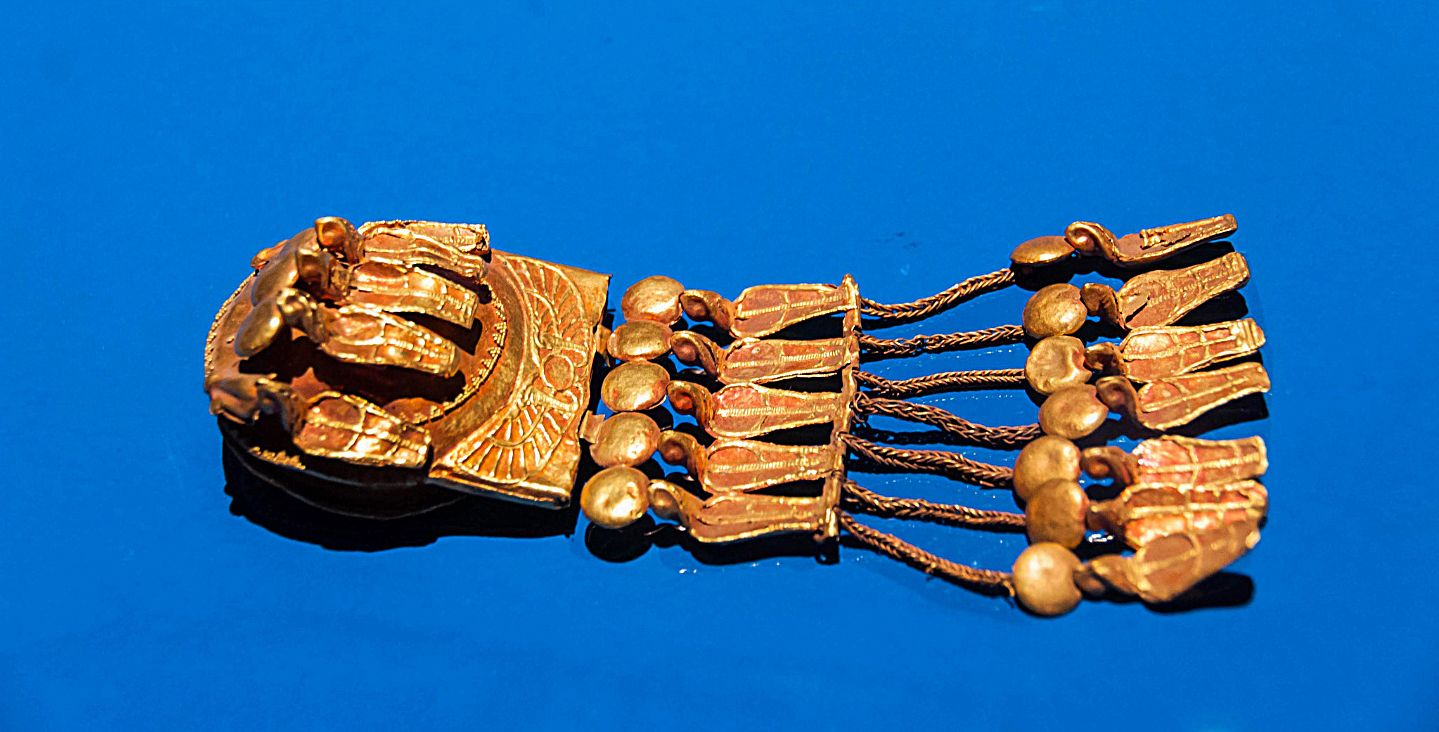
A rare 20th Dynasty Gold earring found in Abydos.

The royal necropolises of the earliest dynasties were placed about a mile into the great desert plain, in a place now known as Umm El Qa'ab "The Mother of Pots" because of the shards remaining from all of the devotional objects left by religious pilgrims.

The earliest burial is about 10 ft × 20 ft (3.0 m × 6.1 m) inside, a pit lined with brick walls and originally roofed with timber and matting. Other tombs also built before Menes are 15 ft × 25 ft (4.6 m × 7.6 m). The probable tomb of Menes is of the latter size. Afterwards, the tombs increased in size and complexity. The tomb-pit was surrounded by chambers to hold offerings, the sepulchre being a great wooden chamber in the midst of the brick-lined pit. Rows of small pits, tombs for the servants of the pharaoh, surrounded the royal chamber, many dozens of such burials being usual. Some of the offerings included sacrificed animals, such as the asses found in the tomb of Merneith. Evidence of human sacrifice exists in the early tombs, such as the 118 servants in the tomb of Merneith, but this practice was changed later into symbolic offerings.

By the end of the Second Dynasty the type of tomb constructed changed to a long passage with chambers on either side, the royal burial being in the middle of the length. The greatest of these tombs with its dependencies, covered a space of over 3,000 square metres (0.74 acres), however it is possible for this to have been several tombs which abutted one another during construction; the Egyptians had no means of mapping the positioning of the tombs. The contents of the tombs have been nearly destroyed by successive plunderers; but enough remained to show that rich jewellery was placed on the mummies, a profusion of vases of hard and valuable stones from the royal table service stood about the body, the store-rooms were filled with great jars of wine, perfumed ointments, and other supplies, and tablets of ivory and of ebony were engraved with a record of the yearly annals of the reigns. The seals of various officials, of which over 200 varieties have been found, give an insight into the public arrangements.

A cemetery for private persons was put into use during the First Dynasty, with some pit-tombs in the town. It was extensive in the Twelfth and Thirteenth Dynasties and contained many rich tombs. A large number of fine tombs were made in the Eighteenth to Twentieth Dynasties, and members of later dynasties continued to bury their dead here until the Roman period. Many hundreds of funeral steles were removed by Auguste Mariette's workmen, without any details of the burials being noted. Later excavations have been recorded by Edward R. Ayrton; MacIver, El Amrah and Abydos; and Garstang, El Arabah.

=== "Forts" ===
Some of the tomb structures, referred to as "forts" by modern researchers, lay behind the town. Known as Shunet ez Zebib, it is about 450 ft × 250 ft (137 m × 76 m) over all, and one still stands 30 ft (9.1 m) high. It was built by Khasekhemwy, the last pharaoh of the Second Dynasty. Another structure nearly as large adjoined it, and probably is older than that of Khasekhemwy. A third "fort" of a squarer form is now occupied by a convent of the Coptic Orthodox Church of Alexandria; its age cannot be ascertained.

=== Kom El Sultan ===
The area now known as Kom El Sultan is a big mudbrick structure, the purpose of which is not clear and thought to have been at the original settlement area, dated to the Early Dynastic Period. The structure includes the early temple of Osiris.

== Anthropological data and cultural affinities ==
A study on First Dynasty crania from the royal tombs in Abydos generally demonstrated greater affinity with Kerma Kushites, and Upper Nile Valley groups. Keita noted the predominant pattern was "Southern" or a "tropical African variant" (though others were also observed), which had affinities with Kerma Kushites. Moreover, the analysis too found clear change from earlier craniometric trends, as "lower Egyptian, Maghrebian, and European patterns are observed also, thus making for great diversity". The gene flow and movement of northern officials to the important southern city may explain the findings.

Archaeologist Bruce Williams has advanced the view that Nubian elites participated with their first dynastic counterparts in the development of the pharaonic civilization. Williams also clarified in 1987 that his discovery of the Qutsul incense burner proposed no claim of a Nubian origin or genesis for the pharaonic monarchy but that excavations had shown Nubian linkages and contributions. He maintained that detailed, archaeological evidence had found cemeteries of tombs situated in Qustul, Nubia which were described to be vastly wealthier and greater in size than the Abydos tombs of the first dynastic rulers.

According to American historian and linguist, Christopher Ehret, the ritual practice of retainer sacrifice found in the royal tombs of Abydos originated from the southern region in the Middle Nile. Ehret also stated that this cultural practice was shared with the Kerma kingdom of the Upper Nubian Nile region.

== See also ==
- List of ancient Egyptian towns and cities
- S 9 (Abydos)
- S 10 (Abydos)
- Tomb CS4
- Mahat chapel of Mentuhotep II
