= Portal Temple =

The so-called Portal Temple is located in Abydos in Egypt, right next to the Osiris temple at this place. The temple was erected under Ramesses II (about 1303 BC – 1213 BC), although it is possible that building work started under Seti I.

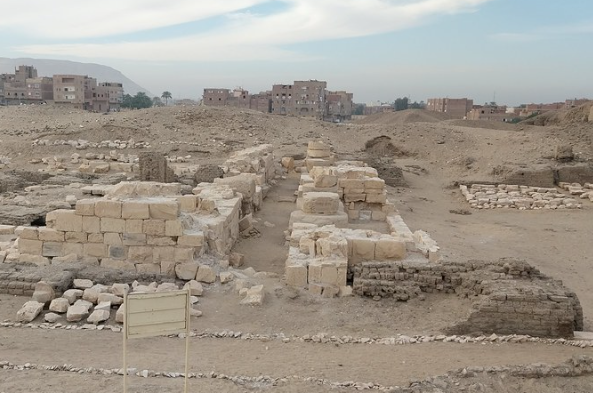
Portal Temple

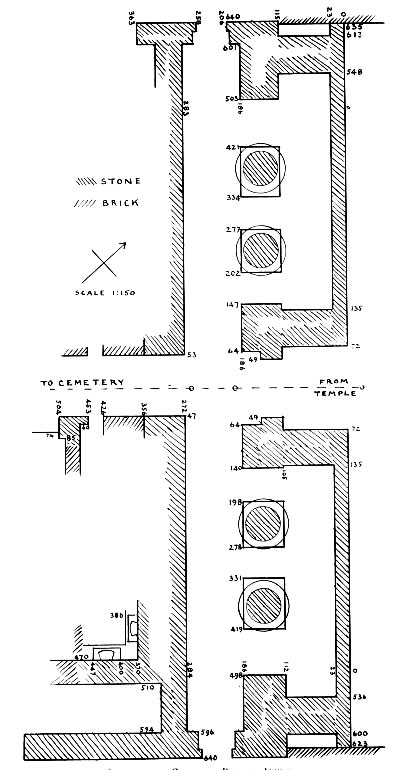
Plan of the Portal Temple

Only the front of the temple is preserved. There are four monumental columns, creating a porticus. At the front there is a courtyard (forecourt̠) framed by mud brick walls. Behind the porticus there is another open courtyard, the inner court. The rest of the temple is totally gone. The temple was already known to Auguste Mariette who published a short description and a plan in 1880. Flinders Petrie published in 1916 a more accurate plan Petrie saw the building as the entrance gateway to the cemeteries of Abydos and hence called it the Portal Temple. The complex was the target of proper excavations in 1967. It became clear that this was a proper temple. Its back part is totally gone. In the temple area were found many ostraca recording the building activities at the temple. Under the lost parts of the temple were found many Middle Kingdom mud brick chapels.
