= Mahat chapel of Mentuhotep II =

Archaeological site in Egypt

The Mahat chapel of Nebhepetre Mentuhotep II is an ancient Egyptian funerary chapel (Egyptian: mahat) built by king Mentuhotep II (reigned c. 2046 BC – 1995 BC) at Abydos. The remains of the well preserved chapel were found in 2014.

The chapel was discovered on 23 April 2014, after noting a ground subsidence in front of a house in Abydos, because of illegal excavations. The Tourism and Antiquities Police was able to find the illegal diggers and the Ministry of Antiquities was sending several archeologists for investigating the remains.

The remains of the chapel are very close to the enclosure of the temple of Temple of Seti I. About 20 meter north of the funerary chapel there are the remains of a similar one, belonging to the New Kingdom king Ramesses I. The excavations have so far unearthed a chamber 2.6 m wide and about 4.2 m below modern floor level. The walls are built of fine limestone and decorated with reliefs. They show different deities and king Nebhepetre Mentuhotep II. A longer inscription states that the chapel was erected for Osiris, Khentiamentiu, Wepwawet and all gods who are in Abydos. The inscription calls the chapel mahat and reports that a canal was dug for the chapel.

At Abydos there are several royal chapels. This one is so far the oldest.
