= Khufu Statuette =

Ancient Egyptian figurine

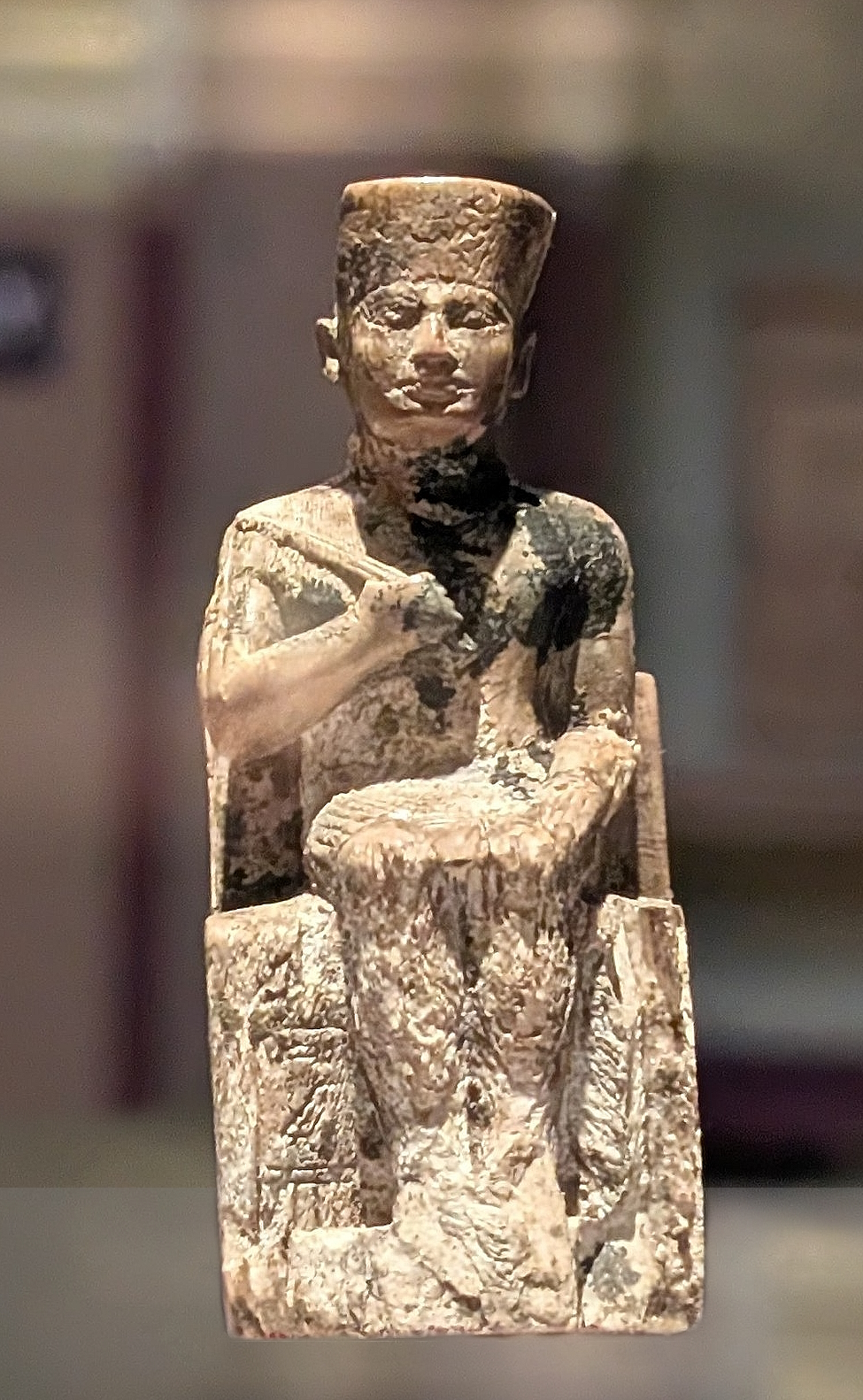
- Material: Ivory
- Size: 2.9 cm long x 2.6 cm deep
- Height: 7.5 cm
- Discovered: 1903; Temple of Khentyamentiu, Abydos, Upper Egypt
- Discovered by: William Petrie
- Present location: Egyptian Museum, Cairo, Egypt
- Identification: JE 36143

The Khufu Statuette or the Ivory figurine of Khufu is an ancient Egyptian statue. Historically and archaeologically significant, it was found in 1903 by Sir William Petrie during excavation of Kom el-Sultan in Abydos, Egypt. It depicts Khufu, a King of the Fourth dynasty (Old Kingdom, c. 2613 to 2494 BC), and the builder of the Great Pyramid of Giza, though it may have been carved much later, in the Twenty-Sixth Dynasty, 664 BC–525 BC.

This small seated figure is the only known three dimensional depiction of Khufu which survives largely intact, though there are also several statue fragments. Most Egyptologists consider the statue contemporary with Khufu very likely from his reign. However, because of the unusual provenance, its dating has been repeatedly questioned. The Egyptologist Zahi Hawass doubts that the statuette dates to the Old Kingdom at all. His argument that the statuette belongs to the 26th Dynasty has not received much credence, but has not yet been refuted. The ritual purpose of the statuette is also unclear. If it was contemporary with Khufu, it was either part of the traditional statue cult or mortuary cult. If the figurine is from a later period, it probably served (as claimed by Hawass) as a votive offering. The statuette's artist is unknown.

== Description ==
The ivory figurine is about 7.5 cm high, 2.9 cm long and c. 2.6 cm wide and partially damaged. Its outer surface was originally smooth and polished to a sheen. The statuette depicts Khufu with the Red crown (deshret) of Lower Egypt. The King sits on a largely undecorated throne with a low back. In his right hand, which is placed over his breast, he holds a flail against his right shoulder with the flail lying over his upper arm. His left arm is bent with his lower arm resting on his left thigh. The left hand is open, with the palm resting on his left knee. His feet have broken away, along with the pedestal. The red crown is damaged – both the ridge at the back and the decorative spiral at the front have broken off. His head is slightly over proportioned relative to his body, with large, projecting ears. His chin is angular and he does not wear the Pharaonic ceremonial beard. The king wears a short, pleated loincloth – his upper body is naked. On the right side, at Khufu's knee is the Horus name "Medjedu" and on the left side of the knee, the very faint traces of the end of his nomen "Khnum-Khufu" is visible in a cartouche.

== Discovery ==
=== Find location ===
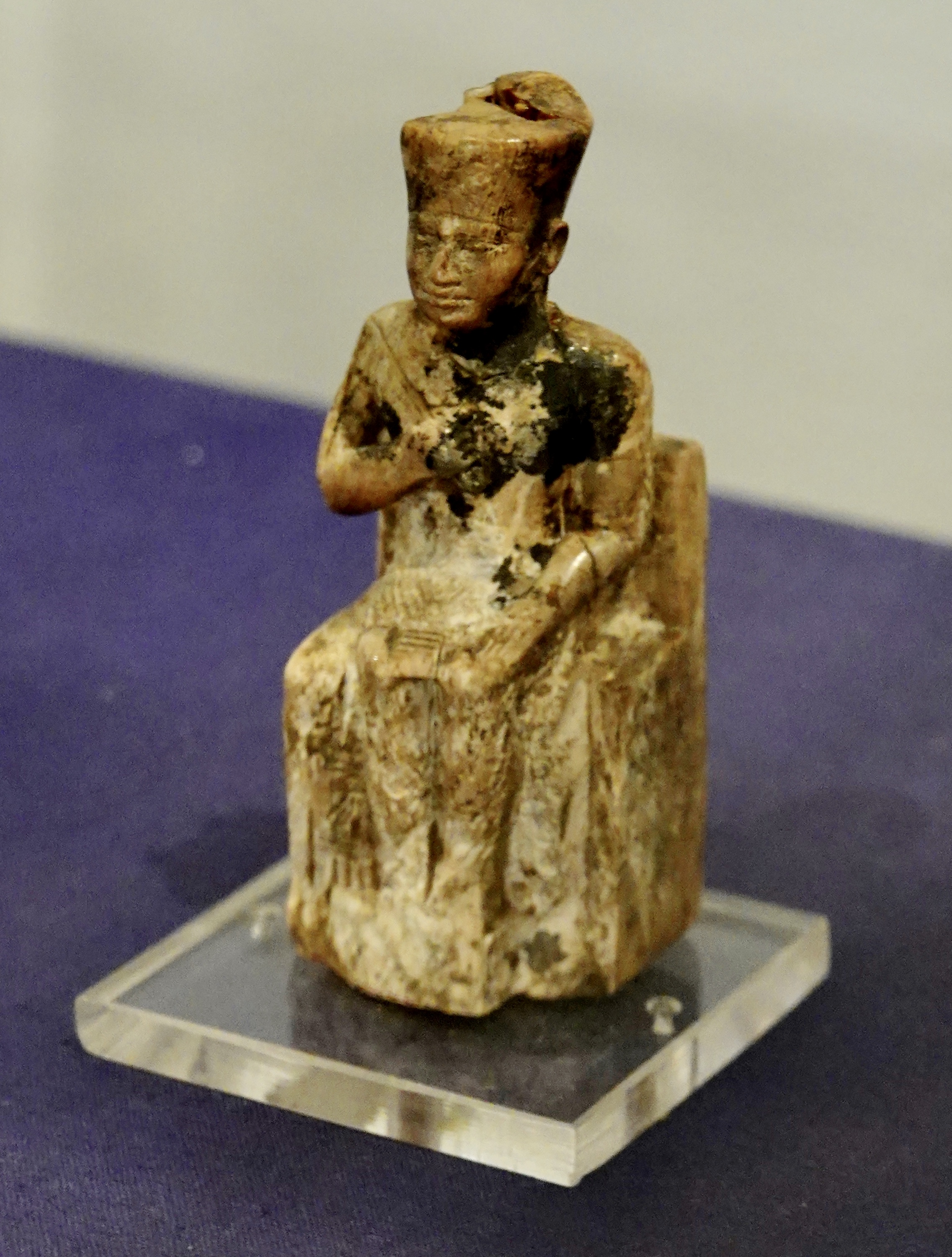
Another view of the Khufu Statuette

The artefact was found in 1903 by Flinders Petrie in the Kom el-Sultan necropolis at Abydos in one of the rooms of "Magazine C" of the large, heavily ruined temple complex of Osiris-Khenti-Amentiu (labelled on the excavation plan as "Building K") in the southern sector. The temple of Kom el-Sultan was dedicated to the jackal god Khenti-Amentiu from the Early Dynastic Period until about the middle of the 3rd Dynasty. In the Middle Kingdom a sanctuary in honour of the mummiform god Osiris was built on the site. Khenti-Amentiu and Osiris merged with each other very early on and the temple complex was seen as the Sanctuary of Osiris-Khenti-Amentiu. Plaster remains of wooden statues from the same period were also found in the aforementioned room of Magazine C.

=== Find situation ===
The Khufu statuette was initially found headless; Petrie ascribed this damage to some form of accident during the excavation. When Petrie read the Horus name "Medjedu", he discovered that the statuette depicted Khufu. Realizing the significance of the discovery, he had all work stopped and announced a reward for the recovery of the head. Three weeks later the head was found among the debris from the room after an intensive sieving. Today, the restored statuette is in the Egyptian Museum in Cairo, in Room 32 with the inventory number JE 36143.

The circumstances of the Khufu statuette's discovery have been called "unusual" and "contradicting". Zahi Hawass in particular sees the find situation as a strong argument for his doubts about the dating of the figure. He argues that no buildings which certainly date from the fourth dynasty have ever been excavated at Abydos or Kom el-Sultan and that Petrie was strictly speaking only convinced that Room C must have been a Fourth Dynasty temple or shrine because of the discovery of the Khufu statuette. But building K (next to the magazines) has since turned out to be part of a 6th Dynasty building complex. A number of objects from the 1st, 2nd, 6th and 30th Dynasties have been found in the Temple of Khenti-Amentiu, but nothing that can be surely dated to the 4th Dynasty. Furthermore, the temple does not seem to have been in use during this period. Petrie could not find any evidence of buildings from Khufu's time in his excavations, but he explained this with a reference to the Greek historians Herodotus and Diodorus, who report that Khufu forbade the erection of temples and shrines to the gods during his reign. However, recently Richard Bussmann pointed to an unpublished limestone fragment at Abydos with Khufu's name, which shows at least some of the building activity at Abydos belongs to Khufu. Bussmann asks, therefore, whether Building K could have been a temple for the cult of Khufu.

== Art historical significance ==
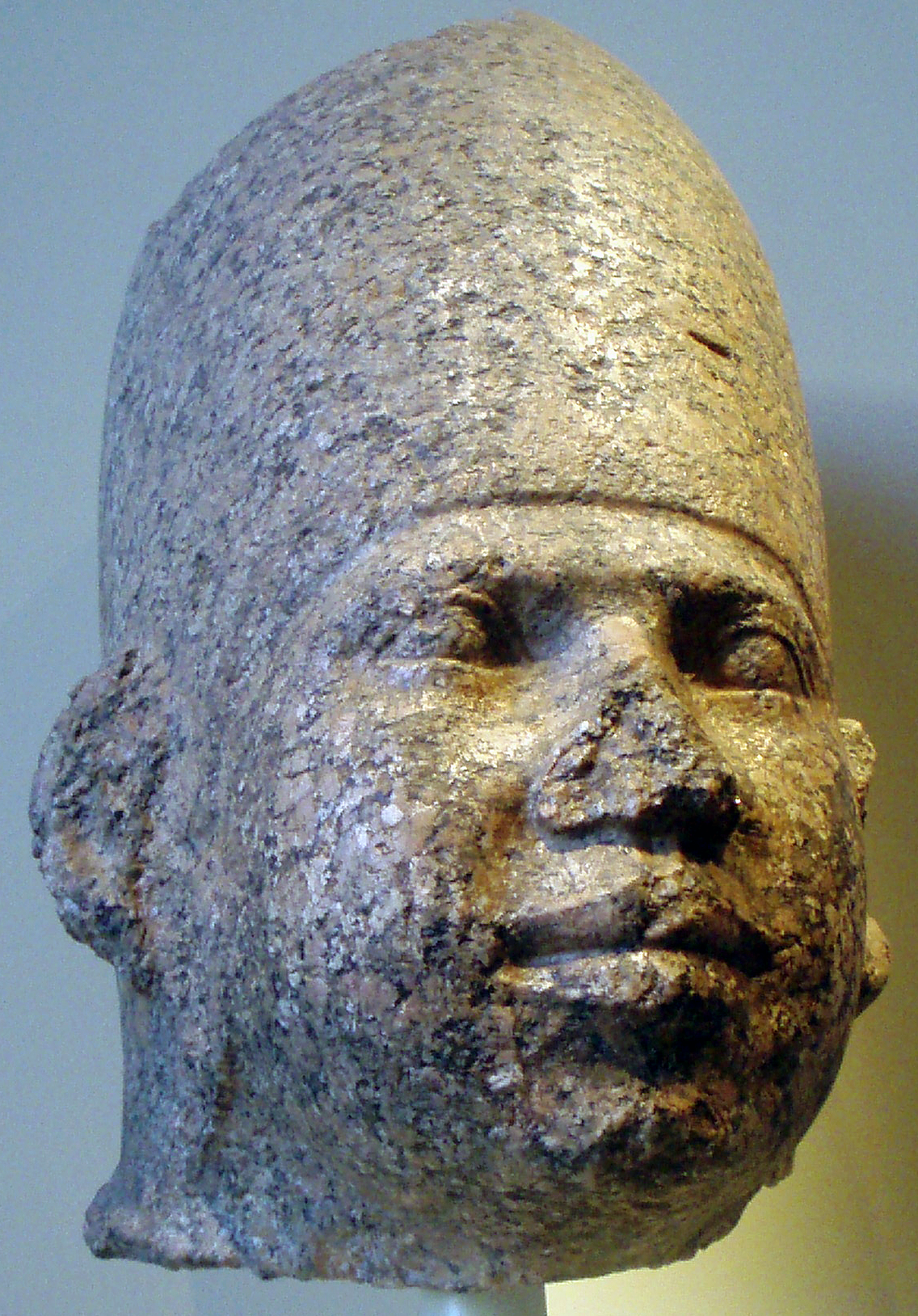
"Brooklyn Royal Head", depicting either Khufu or Huni

The statuette is the only complete three dimensional object which depicts Khufu. It is often claimed that the little ivory figurine is the only surviving statue of Khufu. However, there are also several alabaster fragments of seated statues, which were found by George Reisner during his excavations at Giza. Altogether, Rainer Stadelmann estimates that around fifty statues of Khufu must have stood in the king's mortuary temple originally. He estimated that twenty-one to twenty-five statues were taken over by Khufu's successor Djedefre for reuse at Abu Rawash. On the bases of the statues of Khufu, however, the complete royal titulary of the king was inscribed; today the names only survive in fragments, but they are enough to enable a certain identification. These used the full name (Khnum-Khufu) as often as the shortened form (Khufu). On one of the fragments from a small seated statue the king's feet survive up to the ankles. To the right of his feet is the syllable "fu" in a cartouche, which can easily be reconstructed as the name of king "Khufu".

The Palermo stone fragment C2 reports the creation of two colossal standing statues of the king - one of copper and the other of pure gold.

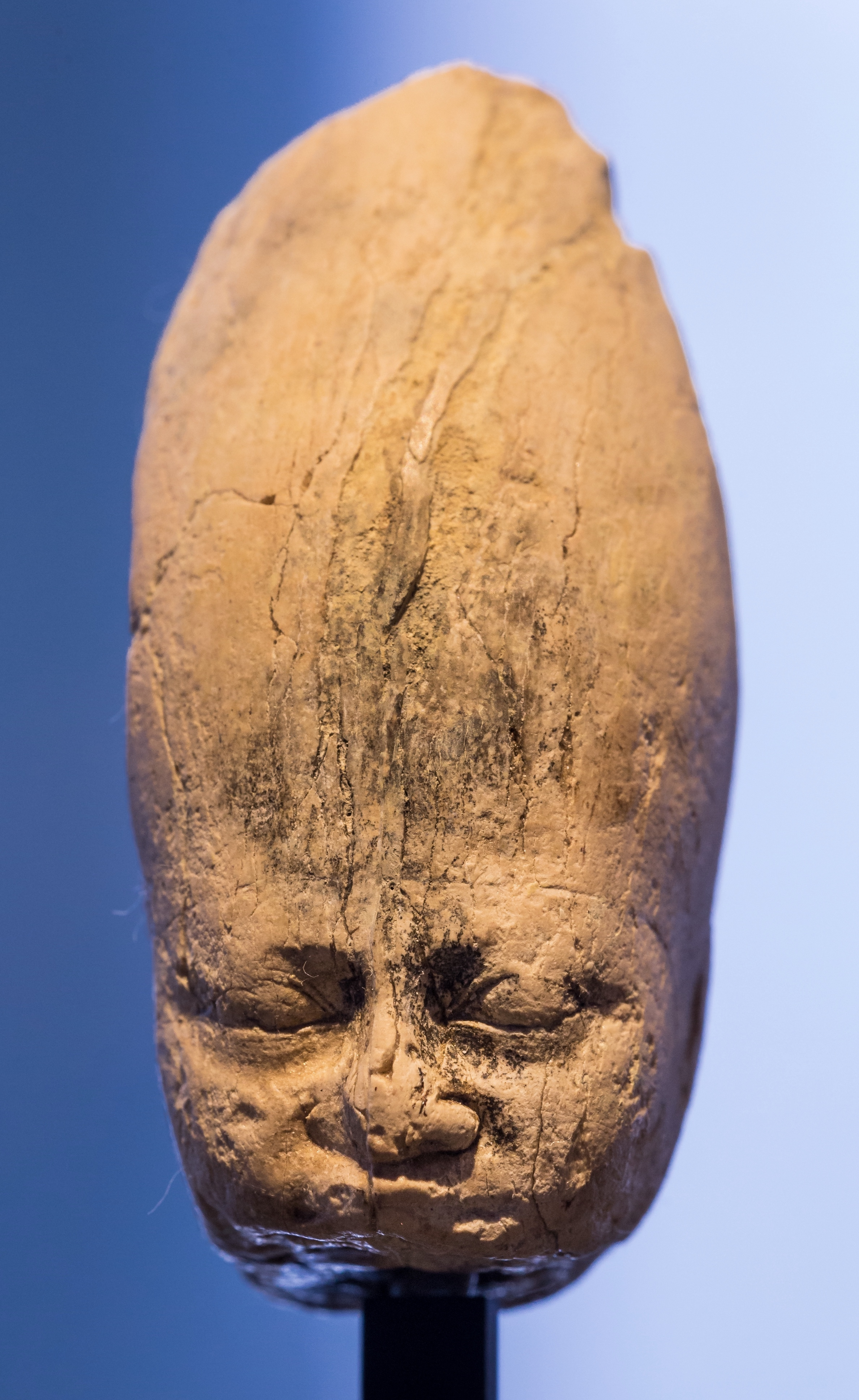
"Munich Royal Head", Head of Khufu. Old Kingdom, 4th Dynasty, c. 2500 BC. State Museum of Egyptian Art, Munich.

Several statue heads also survive, which are sometimes attributed to Khufu on account of their stylistic features. The best known of these are the rose granite "Brooklyn Royal Head" (though it's also thought to depict Huni) and the limestone "Munich Royal Head". Both heads show the king in the White crown of Upper Egypt.

An unusual example is the front part of a polished basalt ram statue, with the Horus and Cartouche names of Khufu on it.

== Dating ==
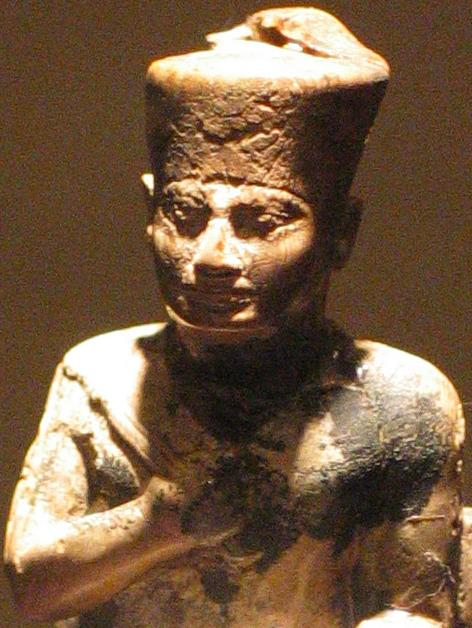
Close up of the Khufu Statuette

The majority of Egyptologists put the statuette in the Old Kingdom at the time of Khufu. Petrie was especially sure that the figure had to derive from the 4th dynasty. The main argument for dating it to the 4th dynasty is the name of Khufu on the statuette. The style of the statuette in comparison with the artworks of the same period and earlier dynasties was cited as further evidence. Rainer Stadelmann pointed out that the figurine's throne is modelled on the short-backed, cubic throne of the Predynastic period. Barry Kemp and William Smith further pointed out that the Khufu statuette's face most closely resembles those of statues from the time of Khasekhemwy, Djoser, and Sneferu in execution. The faces of Khasekhemwy and Snefru are also beardless and Khufu's facial expression seems to be modelled on that of Djoser's limestone statues. In particular, the broad nose, rounded face and the rather schematic eyebrows are clearly inspired by the artistic style of the 3rd dynasty. The slightly protruding ears recall those on the statues of Khasekhemwy. With this facial composition, the portrait of Khufu is stylistically in transition from the archaic form to the classical Old Kingdom style. This artistic style can no longer be perceived in the artworks of any king after Djedefre; from King Khafre, depictions of the kings include the ceremonial beard. The artistic elaboration of the ivory figure has been universally acclaimed by researchers as "masterful" and "professional". It is to this day the earliest known Egyptian sculpture showing a king wearing the Red crown. This becomes more common under Khafre.

Zahi Hawass on the other hand doubts the statuette is contemporary with Khufu. He considers Petrie's dating suspect on account of the find circumstances and points out that Khufu's face is unusually round and chubby and shows no emotion whatsoever. In contrast to Petrie and Margaret Alice Murray, who described the figurine's face as "powerful" and "intimidating" (in accordance with Greek traditions about Khufu), Hawass saw the face of a very young, possibly underage man. Hawass compares the facial appearance of the statuette with the statues of other contemporary kings (such as Snefru, Khafre, and Menkaure). These three kings' faces are of more normal proportions, thin and friendly - they conform to the ideal form which consciously diverges from reality. In particular, an ivory statuette of King Menkaure, now on display in the Boston Museum under the number Boston 11.280a-b, excites Hawass' interest. Although now headless, this figure displays a similar schema to the Khufu statuette, but its body is very slim and athletic and its execution is significantly more careful. The appearance of Khufu in the ivory statuette, however, is claimed not to be particularly well-worked. Khufu himself, in Hawass' view, would never have allowed such a comparatively crude item to be displayed in his palace or elsewhere. Further, Hawass alleges that the shape of the throne has no counterpart in Old Kingdom art: In the Old Kingdom, the back of the royal throne rose to the neck of the ruler. For Hawass, a conclusive proof that the statue must be a reproduction from a later time is the so-called Nehenekh flail in Khufu's left hand. Sculptural depictions of a king with such a flail as a ceremonial insignia do not appear chronologically before the Middle Kingdom. Zahi Hawass, therefore, comes to the conclusion that the figure was probably sold to a pious citizen or pilgrim as an amulet or talisman in the 26th dynasty (or later). The figurine's presence in its find location would then be a result of use as a votive offering.

Zahi Hawass is, finally, convinced that the Khufu statuette is most likely a replica of a life-size or over life-size statue. In his view the original was probably located in Memphis in Lower Egypt, which would explain why Khufu wears the red crown. This assumption also underpinned his dating to the 26th dynasty: at that time, homages to the Old Kingdom were very popular; old, long-forgotten deities were portrayed in reliefs and statues and miniatures of royal statues made and sold as talismans or votive offerings and old, long-forgotten titles of the Old Kingdom were reprised and awarded to officials. For example, the temple of King Taharqa contains reliefs which are modelled after Old Kingdom murals from entirely different contexts. Finally, Hawass maintains that the face of the Khufu statuette most closely resembles the black granite heads of King Taharqa. Citing the work of William S. Smith, Hawass claims that statues of the Old Kingdom Kings were mass-produced in later time, that this probably also applies to the Khufu statuette and that the rather sloppy form of the statuette corroborates this.

== Bibliography ==
- Zahi Hawass. The Khufu Statuette: Is it an Old Kingdom Sculpture? in Paule Posener-Kriéger (ed.): Mélanges Gamal Eddin Mokhtar (= Bibliothèque d'étude, Vol. 97, 1). Institut français d'archéologie orientale du Caire, Cairo 1985, ISBN 2-7247-0020-1.
- W. M. Flinders Petrie. Abydos Part II. The Egypt Exploration Fund, London 1903, (Online Version).
- Abeer El-Shahawy, Farid S. Atiya. The Egyptian Museum in Cairo. A Walk Through the Alleys of Ancient Egypt. American University in Cairo Press, New York/Cairo 2005, ISBN 9771721836.
- William Stevenson Smith, William Kelly Simpson. The Art and Architecture of Ancient Egypt (= Pelican history of art, Vol. 14). 3rd edition, Yale University Press, New Haven 1998, ISBN 0300077475.
- Die Hauptwerke im Ägyptischen Museum in Kairo. Official Catalogue. Edited by the Supreme Council of Antiquities of the Arab Republic of Egypt. von Zabern, Mainz 1986, ISBN 3-8053-0640-7; ISBN 3-8053-0904-X, No. 28.
